= Naderi =

Naderi is a popular surname in Afghanistan and Iran. Notable people with the surname include:

- Ahmad Naderi (born c. 1980), Iranian paralympic athlete
- Ali Naderi, Iranian politician
- Amir Naderi, Iranian film director, screenwriter, and photographer
- Fariba Naderi (born 1984), Iranian actress
- Farkhunda Zahra Naderi, Afghan rights activist and peace campaigner
- Firouz Naderi, Iranian-American scientist
- Kamran Afshar Naderi, Iranian architect
- Mehdi Naderi, Iranian film director
- Mohammad Naderi (born 1978), Iranian actor
- Mohammad Naderi (born 1996), Iranian footballer
- Najib Naderi (born 1984), Afghan footballer
- Partaw Naderi, Poet from Afghanistan
- Rawnaq Naderi, Afghan poet and scholar
- Ryan Naderi (born 2003), German footballer
- Sadat Mansoor Naderi, Afghan businessman, politician, former Minister at State Ministry for Peace
- Sayed Jafar Naderi, Afghan Ismaili military commander (1988–1998)
- Sayed Mansur Naderi, political and religious leader in Afghanistan
