= Islam in Afghanistan =

Afghan Muslims (مسلمانان افغان)
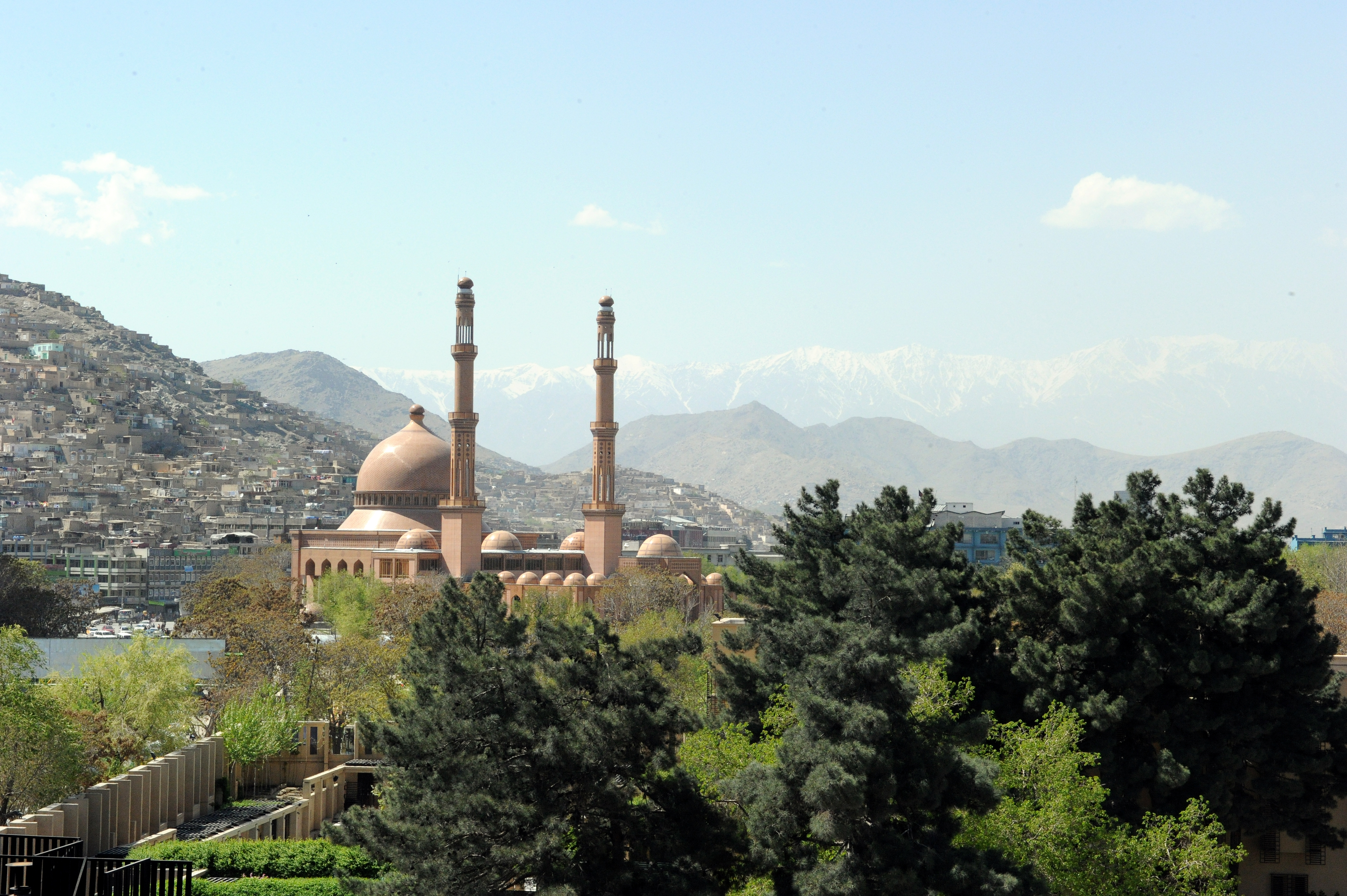
- A view of the Haji Abdul Rahman Mosque in Kabul, the largest Mosque in Afghanistan.

Total population
- 38,200,000 (2022 est.)

Regions with significant populations
- Throughout Afghanistan

Religions
- Predominantly Sunni Islam (Hanafi)

Languages
- Liturgical: Quranic Arabic; Common; Dari, Pashto, Uzbek, Turkmen, Balochi, Pashayi

Islam in Afghanistan (Pew)
1. Sunni Islam (90.0%)
2. Shia (9.99%)
3. Other (0.01%)

Religion	Percent
Islam	99.9%
Others	0.01%
Distribution of religions

Sunni Islam, mainly the Hanafi school, is the largest and the state religion of the Islamic Emirate of Afghanistan. Islam in Afghanistan began to be practiced after the Arab Islamic conquest of Afghanistan from the 7th to the 10th centuries, with the last holdouts to conversion submitting in the late 19th century. It was generally accepted by local communities as a replacement of Buddhism and Zoroastrianism, local tribes began converting to the new religion. Islam is the official state religion of Afghanistan, with approximately 99.9% of the Afghan population being Muslim. Roughly 90% practice Sunni Islam, while the other branch which is around 9.99% are Shias. Most Shias belong to the Twelver branch and only a smaller number follow Ismailism.

After the Islamic conquest of Persia was completed, the Muslim Arabs then began to move towards the lands east of Persia and in 652 captured Herat. By the end of the 10th century CE the Turkic Ghaznavids subdued Kabul Shahi kings.

== History ==
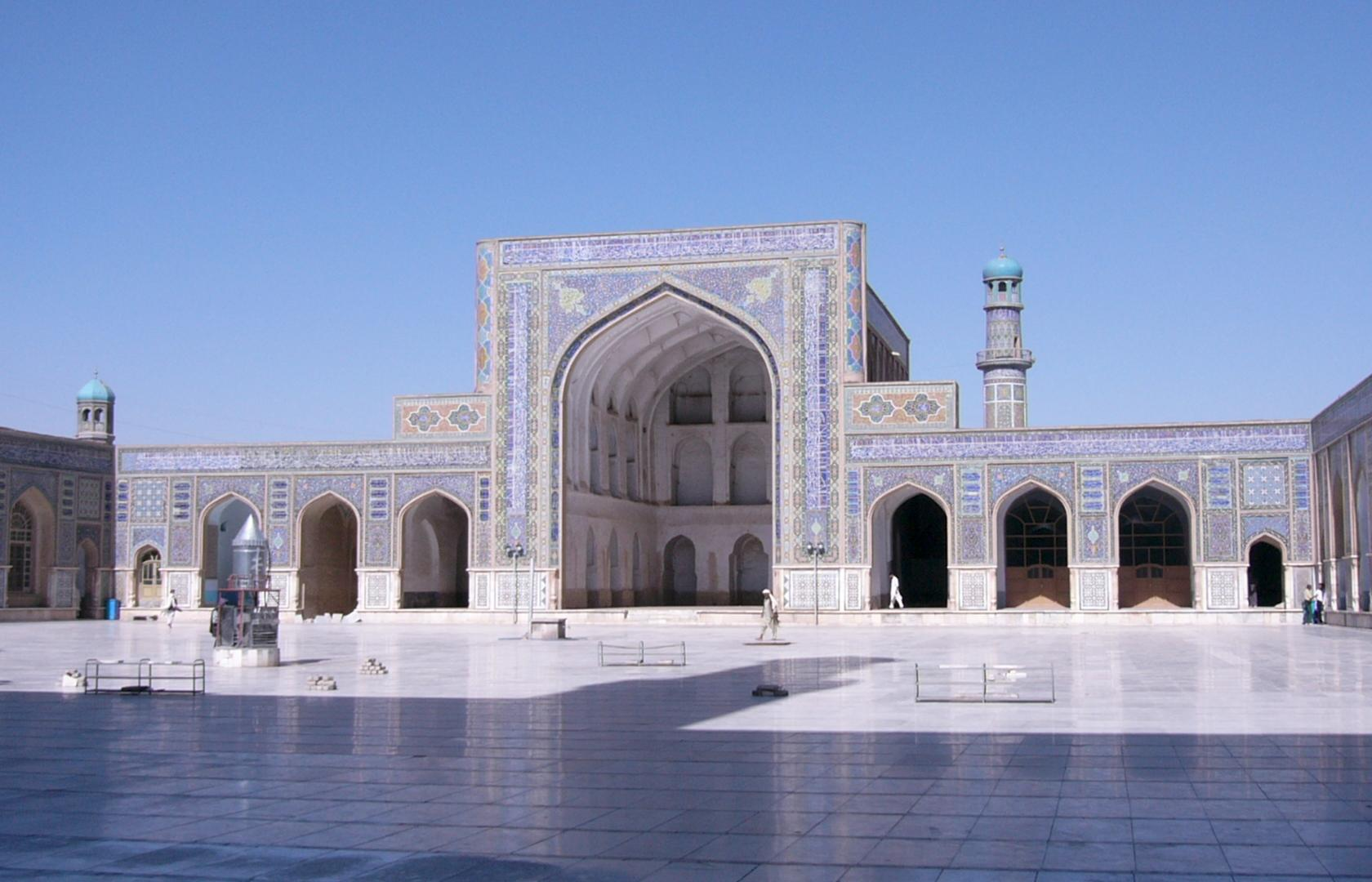
Built during the Ghurids in the 12th century, the Friday Mosque of Herat is one of the oldest mosques in Afghanistan.

During the 7th century, the Rashidun Caliphate Arabs entered the territory that is now Afghanistan after defeating the Sassanid Persians in Nihawand. After this colossal defeat, the last Sassanid emperor, Yazdegerd III, fled eastward deep into Central Asia. In pursuing Yazdegerd, the Arabs entered the area from northeastern Iran via Herat, where they stationed a large portion of their army before advancing toward northern Afghanistan.

Many of the inhabitants of northern Afghanistan accepted Islam through Umayyad missionary efforts, particularly under the reign of Caliph Hisham and Umar ibn AbdulAziz. In the south, Abdur Rahman bin Samara made incursions into Zabulistan which was ruled by the Zunbils.

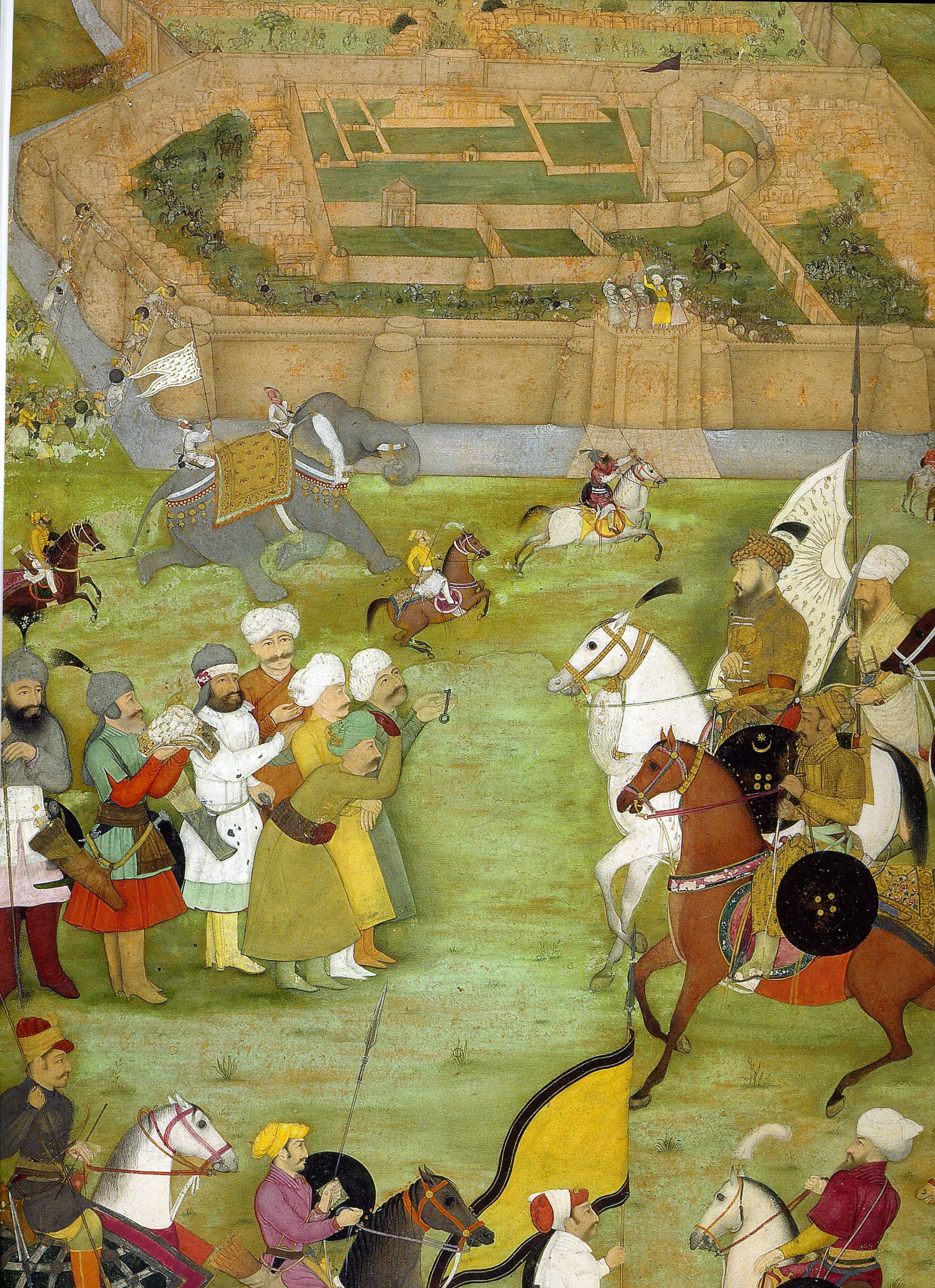
A miniature from Padshahnama depicting the surrender of the Shia Safavid at Kandahar in 1638 to the Sunni Mughal army commanded by Kilij Khan

During the reign of Al-Mu'tasim and his successors, Islam was generally practiced by most inhabitants of the region, and after Abbasid decline, under Ya'qub-i Laith Saffari, Islam was the predominant religion of Kabul and other major cities of Afghanistan. The father of Abu Hanifa, Thabit bin Zuta, was born in the territory that is now Afghanistan. He emigrated to Kufa (in Iraq), where Hanifa was born. Later, the Samanids propagated Sunni Islam deep into Central Asia, and the first complete translation of the Qur'an into Persian was made in the 9th century. Since then, Islam has dominated the country's religious landscape. Islamic leaders have entered the political sphere at various times of crisis but rarely exercised secular authority for long.

The remnants of a Shahi presence in Peshawar were expelled by Mahmud of Ghazni in 998 and 1030. The Ghaznavids were replaced by the Ghurid dynasty who expanded the already powerful Islamic empire. The Friday Mosque of Herat is one of the oldest mosques in the country, believed to have been first built under the Ghurids in the 12th century. During this period, known as the Islamic Golden Age, Afghanistan became the second major center of learning in the Muslim world after Baghdad.

After the Mongol invasion and destruction, the Timurids rebuilt the area and once again made it a center of Islamic learning. Shia Islam made its way to southern Afghanistan during the Safavid rule in the 16th century. Until Mir Wais Hotak liberated the Afghans in 1709, the Kandahar region of Afghanistan was often a battleground between the Shia Safavids and the Sunni Mughals.

=== Conquest by Abdur Rahman Khan ===
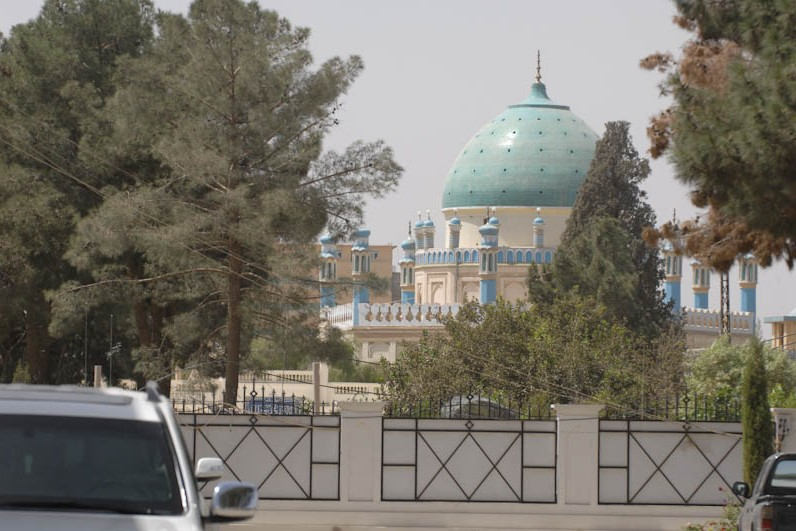
The Friday Mosque in Kandahar. Adjacent to it is the Shrine of the Cloak and the tomb of Ahmad Shah Durrani.

The first systematic employment of Islam as an instrument of state-building was initiated by King Abdur Rahman Khan (1880–1901) during his drive toward centralization. He decreed that all laws must comply with Islamic law and thus elevated the Shariah over customary laws embodied in the Pashtunwali. The ulama were enlisted to legitimize and sanction his state efforts as well as his central authority. This enhanced the religious community on the one hand, but as they were increasingly inducted into the bureaucracy as servants of the state, the religious leadership was ultimately weakened. Many economic privileges enjoyed by religious personalities and institutions were restructured within the framework of the state; the propagation of learning, once the sole prerogative of the ulama, was closely supervised; and the Amir became the supreme arbiter of justice.

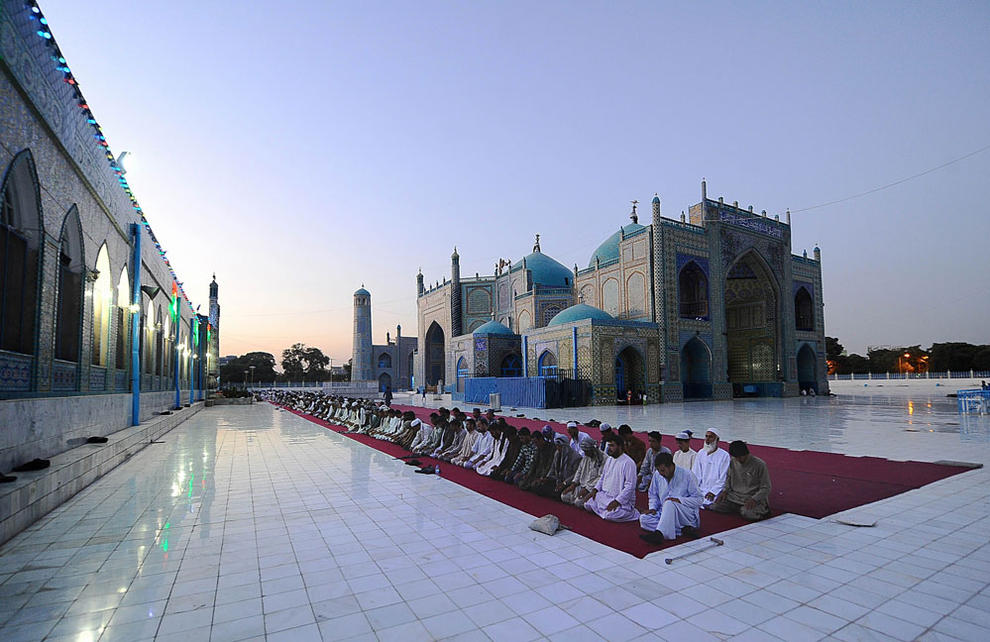
Men praying at the Hazrat Ali Mazar in the northern Afghan city of Mazar-i-Sharif

Abdur Rahman Khan's successors continued and expanded his policies as they increased the momentum of secularization. Islam remained central to interactions, but the religious establishment remained essentially non-political, functioning as a moral rather than a political influence. Nevertheless, Islam asserted itself in times of national crisis. Moreover, when the religious leadership considered themselves severely threatened, charismatic religious personalities periodically employed Islam to rally disparate groups in opposition to the state. They rose up on several occasions against King Amanullah Shah (1919–1929), for example, in protest against reforms they believed to be western intrusions inimical to Islam.

Subsequent rulers, mindful of traditional attitudes antithetical to secularization, were careful to underline the compatibility of Islam with modernization. Even so, and despite its pivotal position within the society, which continued to draw no distinction between religion and state, the role of religion in state affairs continued to decline.

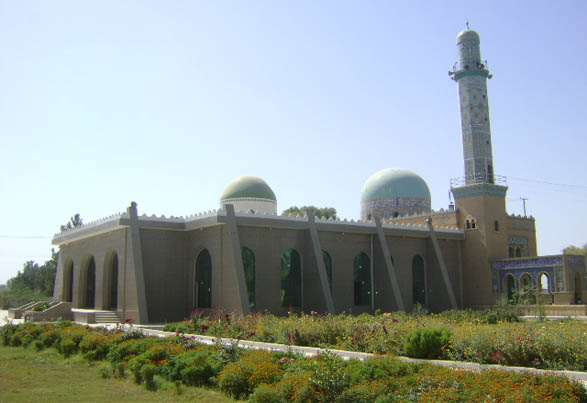
A mosque in Lashkar Gah, in the south of the country

The 1931 Constitution made Hanafi Shariah the state religion, while the 1964 Constitution simply prescribed that the state should conduct its religious ritual according to the Hanafi school. The 1977 Constitution declared Islam the religion of Afghanistan, but made no mention that the state ritual should be Hanafi. The Penal Code of 1976 and the Civil Code of 1977, covering the entire field of social justice, represent major attempts to cope with elements of secular law based on, but superseded by, other systems. Courts, for instance, were enjoined to consider cases first according to secular law, resorting to Shariah in areas secular law did not cover. By 1978, the government of the People's Democratic Party of Afghanistan (PDPA) openly expressed its aversion to the religious establishment. Nonetheless, Islamic rhetoric was still utilized by PDPA politicians throughout its existence, with Hafizullah Amin declaring that the PDPA was based upon Islamic principles. The largely secular PDPA rule precipitated the fledgling Islamist Movement into a national revolt; Islam moved from its passive stance on the periphery to play an active role.

Politicized Islam in Afghanistan represents a break from Afghan traditions. The Islamist Movement originated in 1958 among faculties of Kabul University, particularly in the Faculty of Islamic Law, which had been founded in 1952 with the stated purpose of raising the quality of religious teaching to accommodate modern science and technology. The founders were largely professors influenced by the Egyptian Muslim Brotherhood, a party formed in the 1930s that was dedicated to Islamic revivalism and social, economic, and political equity. Their objective is to come to terms with the modern world through the development of a political ideology based on Islam. The Afghan leaders, while indebted to many of these concepts, did not forge strong ties to similar movements in other countries.

The liberalization of government attitudes following the passage of the 1964 Constitution ushered in a period of intense activism among students at Kabul University. Professors and their students set up the Muslim Youth Organization (Sazmani Jawanani Musulman) in the mid-1960s at the same time that the leftists were also forming many parties. Initially communist students outnumbered the Muslim students, but by 1970 the Muslim Youth had gained a majority in student elections. Their membership was recruited from university faculties and from secondary schools in several cities such as Mazari Sharif and Herat. Some of these professors and students became the leaders of the Mujahideen rebels in the 1980s.

=== Radicalization and NATO presence ===
The 1979 Soviet invasion in support of a communist government triggered a major intervention of religion into Afghan political conflict, and Islam united the multiethnic political opposition. With the takeover of government by the PDPA in April 1978, Islam had already become central to uniting the opposition against the communist ideology of the new rulers.

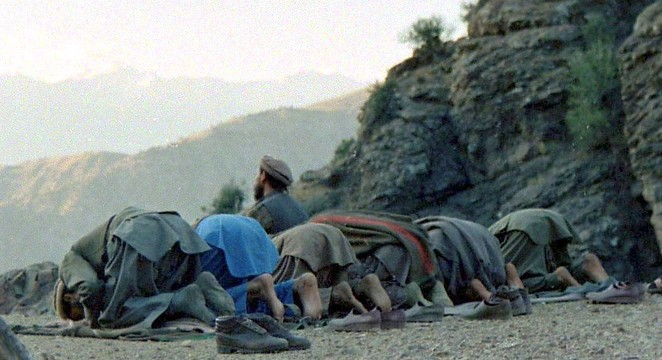
Mujahideen praying in Kunar Province during the 1980s Soviet–Afghan War

The Soviet invasion and the Iranian Revolution not only led national uprisings but also the importation of foreign radical Muslims to Afghanistan. The mujahideen leaders were charismatic figures with dyadic ties to followers. In many cases military and political leaders replaced the tribal leadership; at times the religious leadership was strengthened; often the religious combined with the political leadership. Followers selected their local leaders on the basis of personal choice and precedence among regions, sects, ethnic groups or tribes, but the major leaders rose to prominence through their ties to outsiders who controlled the resources of money and arms.

With the support of foreign aid, the mujahideen were ultimately successful in their jihad to drive out the Soviet forces, but not in their attempts to construct a political alternative to govern Afghanistan after their victory. Throughout the war, the mujahideen were never fully able to replace traditional structures with a modern political system based on Islam. Most mujahideen commanders either used traditional patterns of power, becoming the new khans, or sought to adapt modern political structures to the traditional society. In time the prominent leaders accumulated wealth and power and, in contrast to the past, wealth became a determining factor in the delineation of power at all levels.

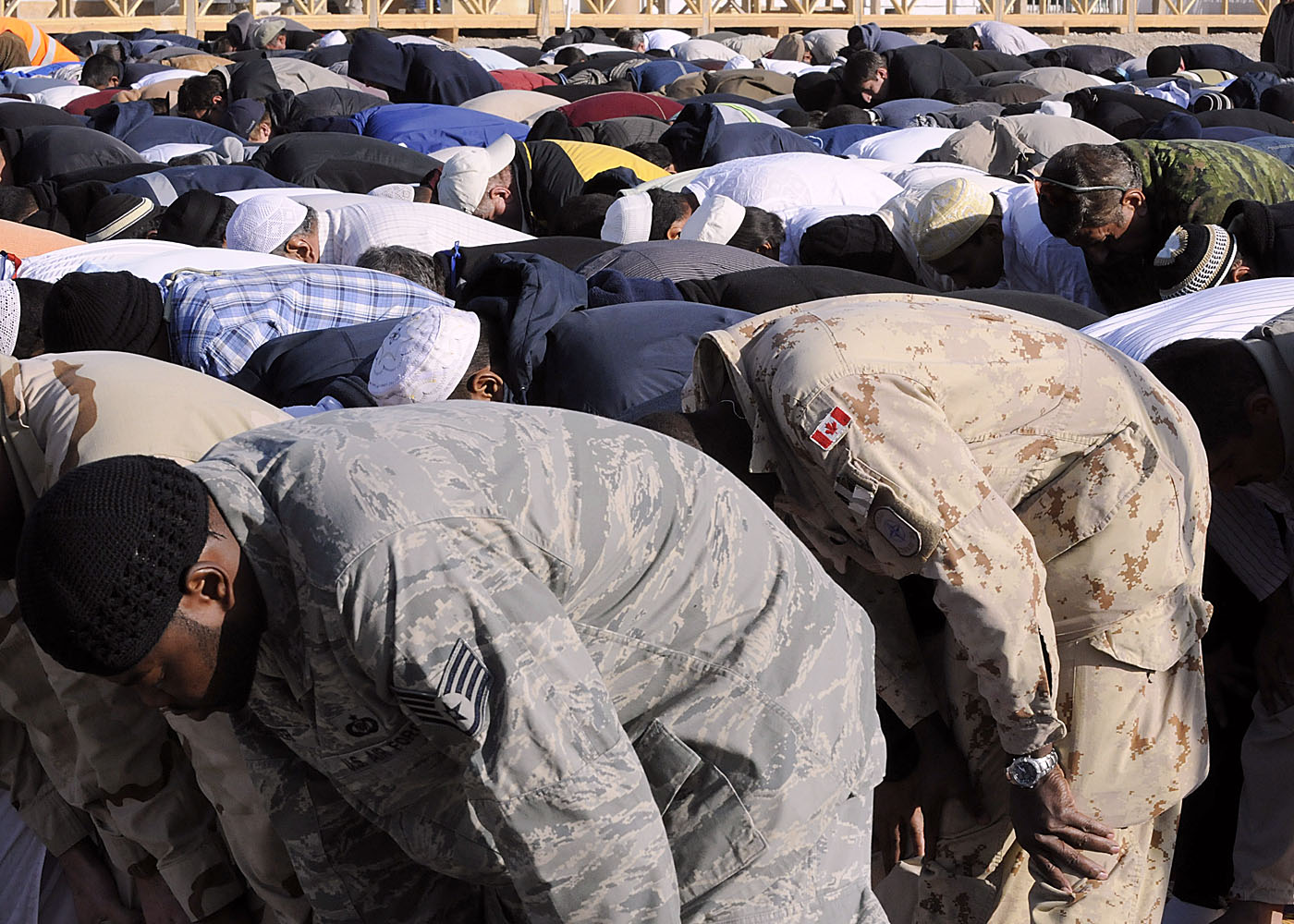
Muslims praying together during an Eid al-Adha worship service at Kandahar Air Base in southern Afghanistan

With the departure of foreign troops and the long sought demise of Kabul's leftist government, The Islamic State of Afghanistan finally came into being in April 1992. This represented a distinct break with Afghan history, for religious specialists had never before exercised state power. But the new government failed to establish its legitimacy and, as much of its financial support dissipated, local and middle range commanders and their militia not only fought among themselves but resorted to a host of unacceptable practices in their protracted scrambles for power and profit. Throughout the nation the populace suffered from harassment, extortion, kidnapping, burglary, hijacking and acts dishonoring women. Drug trafficking increased alarmingly; nowhere were the highways safe. The mujahideen had forfeited the trust they once enjoyed.

In the fall of 1994 a Deobandi group called the Taliban came forth vowing to cleanse the nation of warlords and criminals. Their intention was to create a "pure" Islamic government subject to their own strict interpretations of the Shariah. Many Pakistani politicians supported the Taliban, including Sami ul Haq who is regarded as the Father of the Taliban. A number of its leaders were one-time mujahideen members, but the bulk of their forces were young Afghan refugees trained in Pakistani Deobandi madrassas (religious schools), especially those run by the Jamiat-e Ulema-e Islam Pakistan, the aggressively conservative Pakistani political religious party headed by Maulana Fazlur Rahman, arch rival of Qazi Hussain Ahmad, leader of the equally conservative Jamaat-e-Islami and longtime supporter of the mujahideen.

Headquartered in Kandahar, mostly Pashtuns from the rural areas, and from the top leadership down to the fighting militia characteristically in their thirties or forties and even younger, the Taliban swept the country. In September 1996 they captured Kabul and established the first iteration of the Islamic Emirate of Afghanistan which existed until 2001. The take over went almost unchallenged. Arms were collected and security was established. At the same time, acts committed for the purpose of enforcing the Shariah included public executions of murderers, stoning for adultery, amputation for theft, a ban on all forms of recreation such as kite flying, chess and cockfights, prohibition on all forms of entertainment like cinema, television, and music, proscriptions against pictures of humans and animals, and an embargo on women's voices over the radio. Women were to remain as invisible as possible, behind the veil, in purdah in their homes, and dismissed from work or study outside their homes. They were toppled by a combined Afghan-NATO military force in late 2001. The majority of them escaped to neighboring Pakistan from where they launched an insurgency against the current NATO-backed Afghan government. Peace negotiations between the Taliban and the Afghan government were ongoing as of 2013.

By 2021, however, the Taliban returned to power and re-established the Islamic Emirate of Afghanistan with similarly restrictive legislation like the first incarnation.

== Islam in Afghan society ==
For Afghans, Islam represents a potentially unifying symbolic system which offsets the divisiveness that frequently rises from the existence of a deep pride in tribal loyalties and an abounding sense of personal and family honor found in multitribal and multiethnic societies such as Afghanistan.

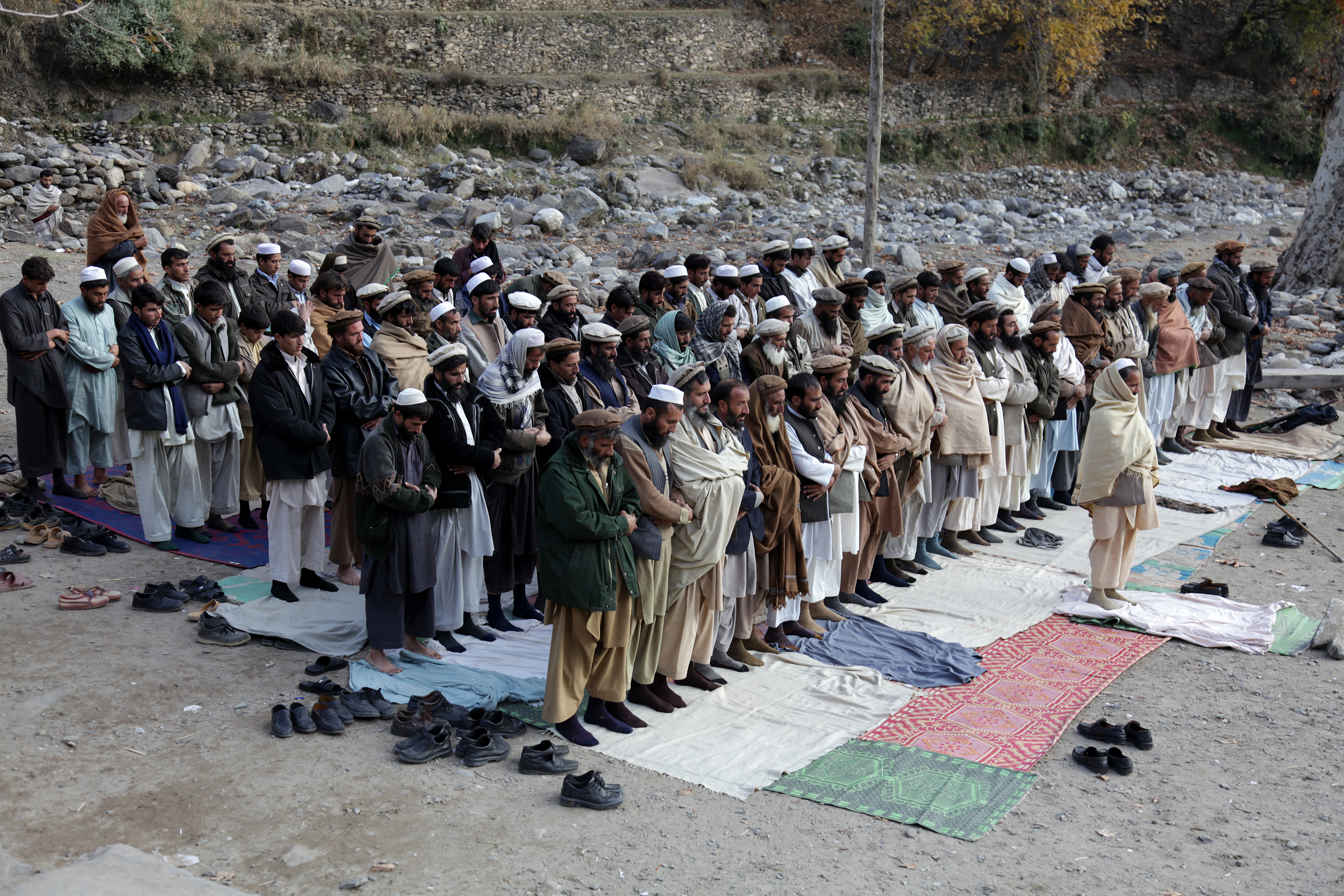
Afghans conducting their afternoon prayer in Kunar Province (December 2009)

Islam is a central, pervasive influence throughout Afghan society; religious observances punctuate the rhythm of each day and season. In addition to a central congregational Mosque for weekly communal prayers which are obligatory for men in Islam (but not for woman) and are generally well attended, smaller community-maintained mosques stand at the center of villages, as well as town and city neighborhoods. Masjids serve not only as places of worship, but for a multitude of functions, including shelter for guests, places to meet, the focus of social religious festivities and schools. Almost every Afghan has at one time during his youth studied at a mosque school; for many this is the only formal education they receive.

Because Islam is a way of life and functions as a comprehensive code of social behavior regulating all human relationships, individual and family status depends on the proper observance of the society's value system based on concepts defined in Islam. These are characterized by honesty, frugality, generosity, virtuousness, piousness, fairness, truthfulness, tolerance and respect for others. To uphold family honor, elders also control the behavior of their children according to these same Islamic prescriptions. At times, even competitive relations between tribal or ethnic groups are expressed in terms claiming religious superiority. In short, Islam structures day-to-day interactions of all members of the community.

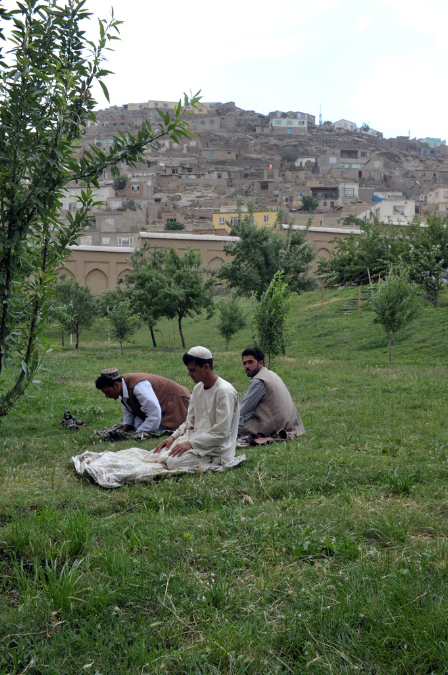
Men praying inside the Gardens of Babur in Kabul

The religious establishment has several levels. Any Muslim can lead informal groups in prayer. Mullahs who officiate at mosques are normally appointed by the government after consultation with their communities and, although partially financed by the government, mullahs are largely dependent for their livelihood on community contributions including shelter and a portion of the harvest. Supposedly versed in the Qur'an, Sunnah, Hadith and Shariah, they must ensure that their communities are knowledgeable in the fundamentals of Islamic ritual and behavior. This qualifies them to arbitrate disputes over religious interpretation. Often they function as paid teachers responsible for religious education classes held in mosques where children learn basic moral values and correct ritual practices. Their role has additional social aspects for they officiate on the occasion of life crisis rituals associated with births, marriages and deaths.

But rural mullahs are not part of an institutionalized hierarchy of clergy. Most are part-time mullahs working also as farmers or craftsmen. Some are barely literate, or only slightly more educated than the people they serve. Often, but by no means always, they are men of minimal wealth and, because they depend for their livelihood on the community that appoints them, they have little authority even within their own social boundaries. They are often treated with scant respect and are the butt of a vast body of jokes making fun of their arrogance and ignorance. Yet their role as religious arbiters forces them to take positions on issues that have political ramifications and since mullahs often disagree with one another, pitting one community against the other, they are frequently perceived as disruptive elements within their communities.

Veneration of saints and shrines is opposed by some Islamic groups, particularly those ascribing to the Salafi or Ahle Hadith. Nevertheless, Afghanistan's landscape is liberally strewn with shrines honoring saints of all descriptions. Many of Afghanistan's oldest villages and towns grew up around shrines of considerable antiquity. Some are used as sanctuaries by fugitives.

Shrines vary in form from simple mounds of earth or stones marked by pennants to lavishly ornamented complexes surrounding a central domed tomb. These large establishments are controlled by prominent religious and secular leaders. Shrines may mark the final resting place of a fallen hero (shahid), a venerated religious teacher, a renowned Sufi poet, or relics, such as a hair of Muhammad or a piece of his cloak (khirqah). A great many commemorate legends about the miraculous exploits of Ali ibn Abi Talib, the fourth caliph and the first Imam of Shi'a Islam believed to be buried at the nation's most elaborate shrine located in the heart of Mazari Sharif, the Exalted Shrine. Ali is revered throughout Afghanistan for his role as an intermediary in the face of tyranny.

Festive annual fairs celebrated at shrines attract thousands of pilgrims and bring together all sections of communities. Pilgrims also visit shrines to seek the intercession of the saint for special favors, be it a cure for illness or the birth of a son. Women are particularly devoted to activities associated with shrines. These visits may be short or last several days and many pilgrims carry away specially blessed curative and protective amulets (usually a tawiz) to ward off the evil eye, assure loving relationships between husbands and wives and many other forms of solace. Like saint veneration, such practices are generally not encouraged in Islam according to classical understanding of the Holy Qu'ran and Hadiths (prophetic sayings of the Rabi)

== Shia Islam in Afghanistan ==
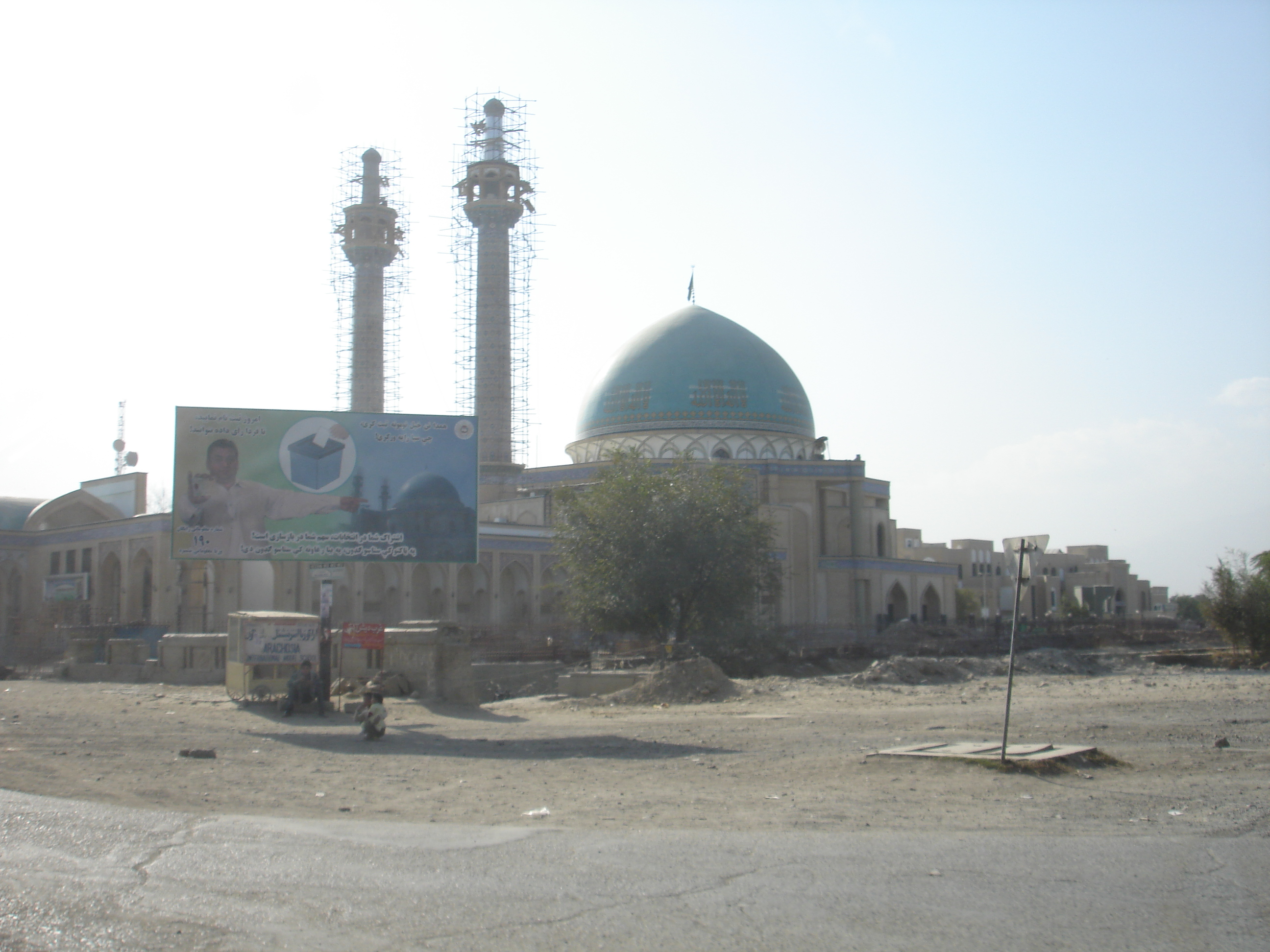
Abul Fazl Mosque in Kabul during construction in 2008, the largest Shia mosque in Afghanistan

Roughly 10% of the Afghan population is Shia. Majority of Shias in Afghanistan belong to the Twelver branch. This includes the Hazara ethnic group and the smaller urbanized Qizilbash group, who are originally from eastern Iran.

Politically aware Shia students formed the Afghan Maoist movement in the 1960s and early 1970s. After the Saur Revolution (April Revolution) of 1978 and the Iranian Revolution of 1979, Shia rebel groups in the Hazarajat region, although frequently at odds with one another, became active in mujahideen activities. They were aided by Shi'a Iran and fought against the Soviet-backed Afghan government as well as other mujahideen groups.

During the political maneuvering leading up to the establishment of the Islamic State of Afghanistan in 1992, the Shi'a groups unsuccessfully negotiated for more equitable, consequential political and social roles.

=== Ismailism ===
The Ismailis accepted Ismail ibn Jafar instead of Musa al-Kadhim as the successor to Imam Jafar as-Sadiq. Ismaili communities in Afghanistan are less populous than the Twelver who consider the Ismaili heretical. They are found primarily in and near the eastern Hazarajat, in the Baghlan area north of the Hindu Kush, among the mountain Tajik of Badakhshan, and amongst the Wakhi in the Wakhan Corridor. The Ismailis believe that the series of Imamat or in another word Welayat that comes from the first Imami, Hazar-e-Ali, will never end. The 49th imam is Aga Khan IV. During the 1980s Soviet war in Afghanistan Sayed Jafar Naderi was the Ismaili commander, called the 'Warlord of Kayan' in a documentary by Journeyman Pictures.

Following the fall of Taliban in 2001, Ismailis established a political party called the National Unity Party of Afghanistan, also known as the National Solidarity Party of Afghanistan which had seats in the Afghan government cabinet, including the State Ministry for Peace in 2020. In 2009, 2014 and 2019 presidential elections it backed Hamid Karzai in 2009, Ashraf Ghani in 2014 and Dr. Abdullah Abdullah in 2019.

== Sufi influences ==
Three Sufi orders are prominent: the Naqshbandiya founded in Bukhara, the Qadiriya founded in Baghdad, and the Cheshtiya located at Chesht-i-Sharif east of Herat. Among the Naqshbandi, Ahmad al Faruqi Kabuli, born north of Kabul, acquired renown for his teachings in India during the reign of the Moghul Emperor Akbar in the sixteenth century.

Another famous Qadiriya pir named Mawlana Faizani came to prominence in the 1960s and 1970s, and was a leading critic against the creeping influence of communist philosophy. Jailed in the mid-70s, Mawlana Faizani disappeared when the khalqis came to power and remains missing to this day.

The Cheshtiya order was founded by Mawdid al-Cheshti who was born in the twelfth century and later taught in India. The Cheshtiya brotherhood, concentrated in the Hari River valley around Obe, Karukh and Chehst-i-Sharif, is very strong locally and maintains madrasas with fine libraries. Traditionally the Cheshtiya have kept aloof from politics, although they were effectively active during the resistance within their own organizations and in their own areas.

Herat and its environs has the largest number and greatest diversity of Sufi branches, many of which are connected with local tombs of pir (ziarat). Other Sufi groups are found all across the north, with important centers in Maimana, Faryab Province, and in Kunduz. The brotherhoods in Kabul and around Mazari Sharif are mostly associated with the Naqshbandiya. The Qadiriya are found mainly among the eastern Pashtun of Wardak, Paktia and Nangarhar, including many Ghilzai nomadic groups. Other smaller groups are settled in Kandahar and in Shindand, Farah Province. The Cheshtiya are centered in the Hari River valley. There are no formal Sufi orders among the Shi'a in the central Hazarajat, although some of the concepts are associated with Sayyids, descendants of Mohammad, who are especially venerated among the Shi'a.

Afghanistan is unique in that there is little hostility between the ulama (religion scholars) and the Sufi orders. A number of Sufi leaders are considered as ulama, and many ulama closely associate with Sufi brotherhoods. The general populace accords Sufis respect for their learning and for possessing karamat, the psychic spiritual power conferred upon them by God that enables pirs to perform acts of generosity and bestow blessings (barakat). Sufism therefore is an effective popular force. In addition, since Sufi leaders distance themselves from the mundane, they are at times turned to as more disinterested mediators in tribal disputes in preference to mullahs who are reputed to escalate minor secular issues into volatile confrontations couched in Islamic rhetoric.

Despite the Afghan Sufis' stable position in Afghan society, Sufi leaders were among those executed following the Saur Revolution, among them Baha'uddin Jan, the pir naqshbandi of the Aimaq of Purchaman District, Farah.

== See also ==
- Islam by country
- Islam in South Asia
- Education in Afghanistan
- List of mosques in Afghanistan
- Religion in Afghanistan
- Women in Islam
