= Shia Islam in Afghanistan =

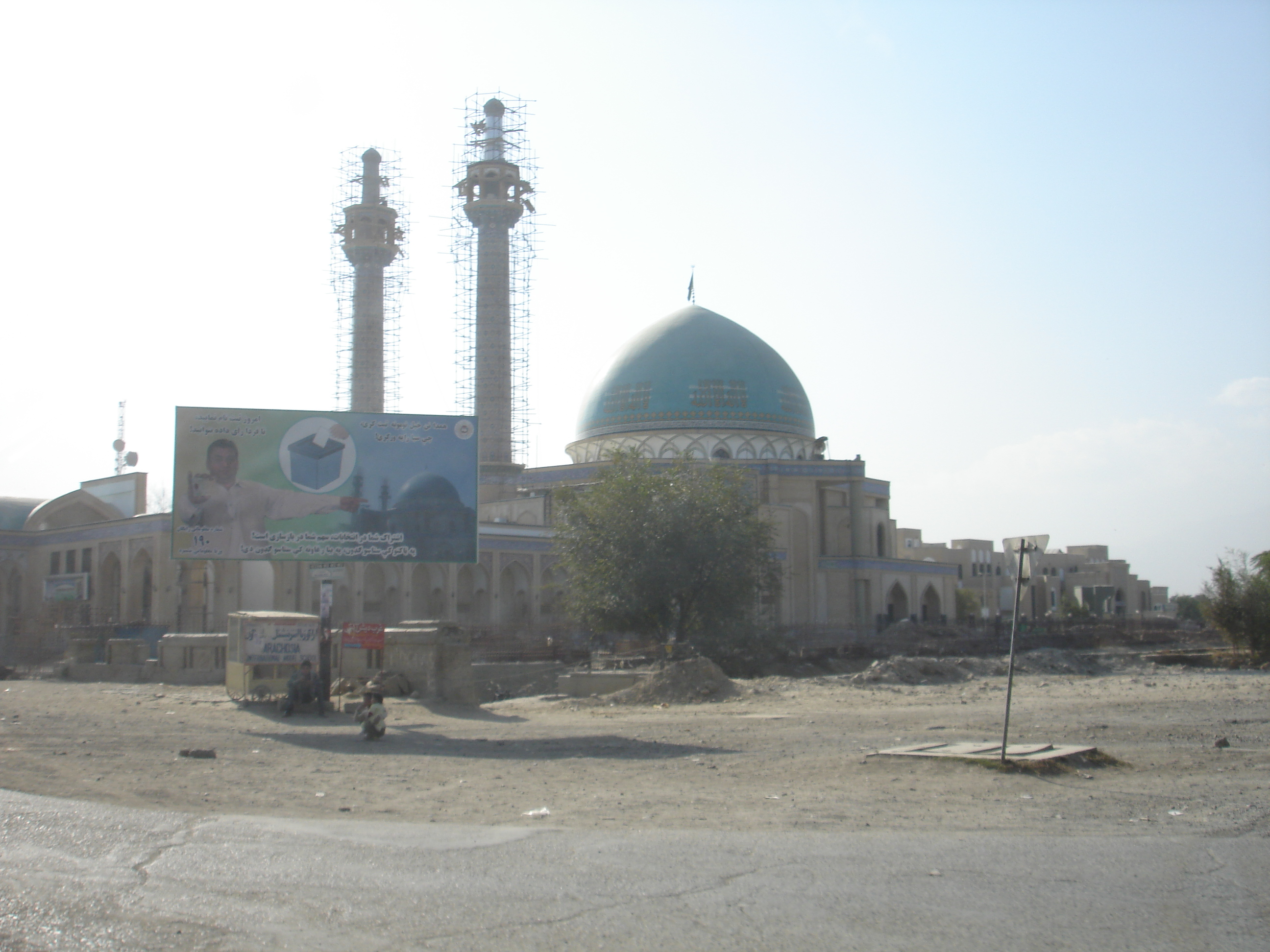
Abul Fazl Mosque in Kabul during construction in 2008, one of the largest Shia mosques in Afghanistan.

Shia Islam in Afghanistan is practiced by a significant minority of the population. According to a 2021 Pew survey, 10-15% of Afghans followed Shia Islam.

== Twelvers ==
The majority of Afghanistan's Shia Muslims are the Twelvers, primarily of the Hazara ethnicity. The next-largest Twelvers are the Tajiks (Farsiwan) of the western Herat and Farah provinces. Other, far smaller, Afghanistan's Twelver communities include the Qizilbash and the Sadat populations.

=== Hazaras ===
Hazaras predominantly practice Islam, with most adhering and following to Shi'a Islam. It is possible that most Hazaras adopted Shi'a Islam in the early 16th century, during the initial years of the Safavid dynasty.

==== Persecution ====
Between 1888 and 1893, more than half of the Hazara population was genocided under the Emirate of Afghanistan, and they have faced persecution at various times over the past decades. Widespread ethnic discrimination, religious persecution, organized attacks by terrorist groups, harassment, and arbitrary arrest for various reasons have affected Hazaras. There have been numerous cases of torture of Hazara women, land and home seizures, deliberate economic restrictions, economic marginalization of the Hazara region and appropriation of Hazara agricultural fields and pastures leading to their forced displacement from Afghanistan.

Due to its majority Shia population, the Dashte Barchi district in western Kabul is frequently attacked by the Islamic State – Khorasan Province. The 2021 Kabul school bombing targeted a girls' school in Dashte Barchi. On 6 September 2022, the Human Rights Watch reported that since the Taliban took over Afghanistan in August 2021, the ISIS–K has claimed responsibility for 13 attacks against Hazaras and has been linked to at least 3 more, killing and injuring at least 700 people. The Islamic State affiliate has repeatedly attacked Hazaras at mosques, schools, and workplaces.

=== Qizilbash ===
Shia Qizilbash in Afghanistan primarily live in urban areas, such as Kabul, Kandahar or Herat. Some of them are descendants of the troops left behind by Nadir Shah. Others however were brought to the country during the Durrani rule, Zaman Shah Durrani had over 100,000 cavalry, consisting mostly of Qizilbash Afghanistan's Qizilbash held important posts in government offices in the past, and today engage in trade or are craftsmen. Since the creation of Afghanistan, they constitute an important and politically influential element of society. Estimates of their population vary from 30,000 to 200,000.

Sir Mountstuart Elphinstone described the Qizilbash of Kabul in the beginning of the 19th century as "a colony of Turks," who spoke "Persian, and among themselves Turkish." Described as learned, affluent, and influential, they appear to have abandoned their native Turkish language in favour of Persian, and became "in fact Persianized Turks". Lady Florentia Sale (wife of Sir Robert Henry Sale) and Vincent Eyre – both companions of Sir Mountstuart Elphinstone – described the Qizilbash of Afghanistan also as "Persians, of Persian descent, or descendant of the Persians, wearing a red cap".

The influence of the Qizilbash in the government created resentment among the ruling Pashtun clans, especially after the Qizilbash openly allied themselves with the British during the First Anglo-Afghan War (1839–1842). During Abdur Rahman Khan's massacre of the Shi'i minorities in Afghanistan, the Qizilbash were declared "enemies of the state" and were persecuted and hunted by the government and by the Sunni majority.

The former national anthem (2006-2021) of Afghanistan mentioned Qizilbash as an ethnic group in the third line of third stanza.

== Ismailis ==
The Ismailis accepted Ismail ibn Jafar instead of Musa al-Kadhim as the successor to Imam Jafar as-Sadiq. Ismaili communities in Afghanistan are less populous than the Twelver who consider the Ismaili heretical. They are found primarily in and near the eastern Hazarajat, in the Baghlan area north of the Hindu Kush, among the mountain Tajik of Badakhshan, and amongst the Wakhi in the Wakhan Corridor. The Ismailis believe that the series of Imamat or in another word Welayat that comes from the first Imami, Hazar-e-Ali, will never end and it continues. Ismaili in Afghanistan are seen to follow their leaders uncritically. The pir or leader of Afghan Ismaili comes from the Sayyid family of Kayan, located in Kayayan valley, 30km west of Doshi, a small town at the northern foot of the Salang Pass, in western Baghlan Province. The current leader of Ismailis in Afghanistan is Sayed Mansur Naderi. During the 1980s Soviet war in Afghanistan this family acquired considerable political power, having over 13,000 armed men who was fighting both with the government and with the different other armed groups including Mujahideen. Sayed Jafar Naderi was the Ismaili commander, known as the 'Warlord of Kayan' in a documentary by Journeyman Pictures. Ismailis have had key contributions to the Islamic culture in Afghanistan including building large mosques, cultural centers and the World's Largest Handmade Quran in Afghanistan, which was unveiled in January 2012.

The Aga Khan Development Network (AKDN) initiated its efforts in Afghanistan in 1996, providing food aid amidst the civil war. Since 2002, AKDN, along with its partners, has allocated over $1 billion to development assistance in the country. The network's multifaceted approach encompasses humanitarian, economic, social, and cultural dimensions. Economically, AKDN's projects extend across more than 240 cities and towns in all 34 provinces of Afghanistan. Its social development and humanitarian initiatives reach into 61 districts across seven provinces, benefiting over three million people. In the realm of cultural preservation, the network has restored over 90 historic buildings in Kabul, Herat, Balkh, and Badakhshan. AKDN's strategy in Afghanistan includes strengthening Afghan institutions and the public sector by engaging communities and local leaders. In the private sector, it supports the Chamber of Commerce, various business associations, and entrepreneurs. The network also enhances the capacity of local civil society organizations, for instance, by expanding community savings programs. AKDN aims for comprehensive area development that is led by Afghan institutions, fostering partnerships among the government, the business sector, and civil society to facilitate the country's transition towards stability and prosperity. A cornerstone of AKDN's efforts in Afghanistan is the emphasis on gender equity. The network actively addresses social barriers, promotes equitable decision-making, and empowers women and girls by enhancing their voice and agency.

Ismailis in Afghanistan have been continuously engaged in the country's political landscape during the democracy era. Following the fall of Taliban in 2001, Ismailis established a political party under the name of National Unity Party of Afghanistan, also called as the National Solidarity Party of Afghanistan. While only about 3-5% population of Afghanistan is Ismaili, they have sent up to four representatives in the Afghanistan National Assembly. They also managed to obtain seats in the Afghan government cabinet, including the State Ministry for Peace in 2020. They played a key role in 2009, 2014 and 2019 presidential elections, backing Hamid Karzai in 2009, Ashraf Ghani in 2014, and Abdullah Abdullah in 2019.

== Participation in war and conflicts ==
Afghan Shias (mostly Hazaras) also fought against the Soviet Union during the Soviet–Afghan War (1979–1989) under the coalition of groups, collectively known as the “Tehran Eight” and also the Muhammad Army (Sepah e Muhammad), which conducted guerrilla attacks on the Soviet Military and the Afghan Military of the Democratic Republic of Afghanistan. These groups also sent fighters as part of the Abuzar Brigade to fight in the Iran–Iraq War (1980–1988) to assist Iran. After the Soviet withdrawal, these groups fought in the Afghan Civil War (1989–1992). Later, these groups formed Hezb-e-Wahdat which fought in the Afghan Civil War (1992–1996) and the Afghan Civil War (1996–2001).

In 2014 the IRGC created the Liwa Fatemiyoun, a Shia Afghan militia formed to fight in Syria on the side of the Ba'athist-Assadist government. It is funded, trained, and equipped by the Iranian Revolutionary Guards, and fights under the command of Iranian officers. Liwa Fatemiyoun has engaged in the primarily Syrian civil war on the side of the Assad regime, while also taking part in the Yemeni civil war (2014–present) on the Houthi side, and in the Sistan and Baluchestan insurgency on behalf of the Iranian government.

== See also ==
- Islam in Afghanistan
- Religion in Afghanistan
- Islamic conquest of Afghanistan
