= Sadat Mansoor Naderi =

Afghan politician, businessman, and entrepreneur (born 1977)

Sadat Mansoor Naderi سعادت منصور نادری
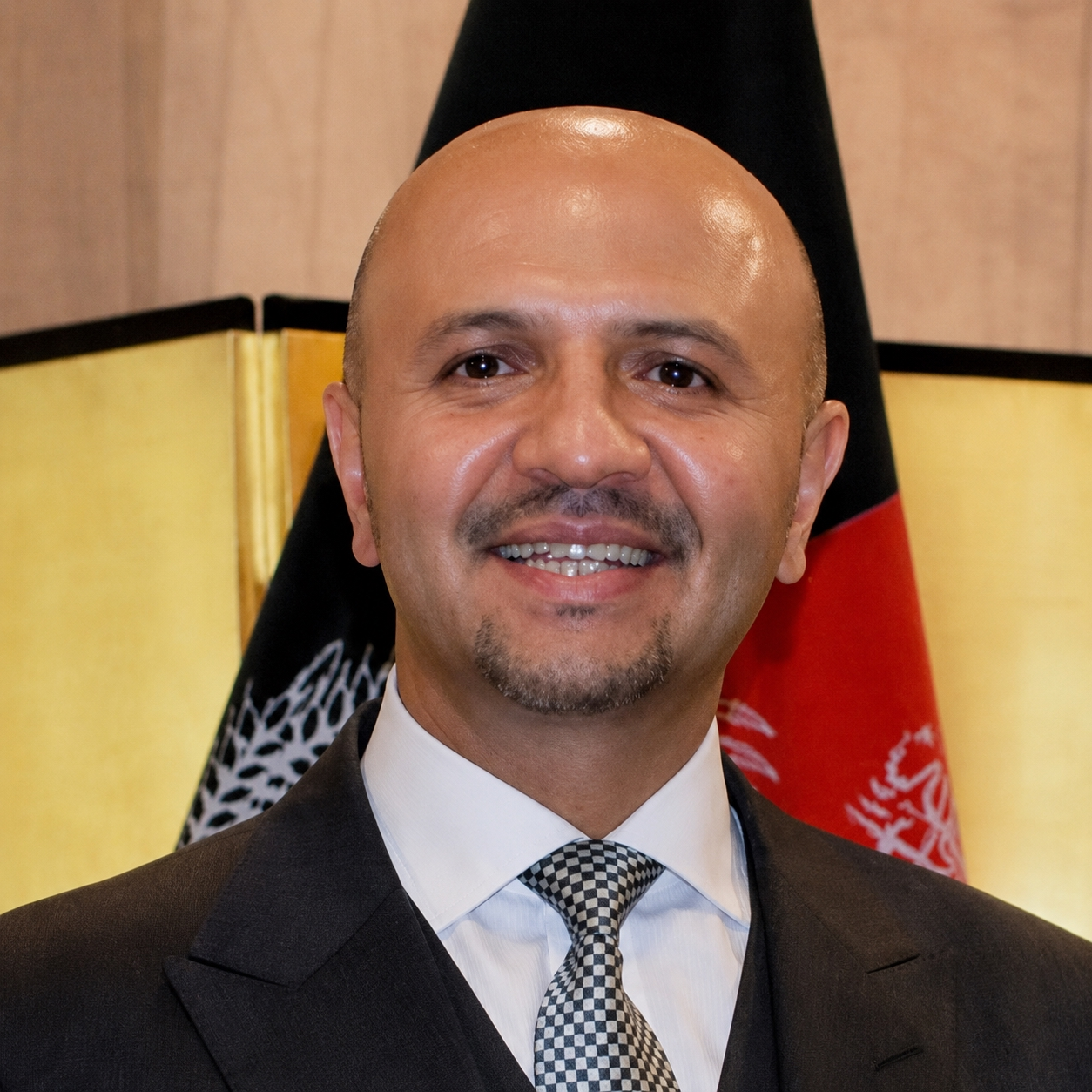
- Naderi at the Embassy of Japan in Kabul, February 2021

State Minister for Peace
- In office 31 August 2020 – 15 August 2021
- President: Ashraf Ghani
- Preceded by: Salam Rahimi
- Succeeded by: Ministry suppressed

Minister of Urban Development and Housing
- In office 22 April 2015 – 13 June 2018
- President: Ashraf Ghani
- Preceded by: Dr. Hassan Abdullahi

Personal details
- Born: Sadat Mansoor Naderi; 3 March 1977 (age 49)
- Party: National Solidarity Party of Afghanistan
- Parent: Sayed Mansur Naderi (father)
- religion: Islam (Ismaili Shia)
- Awards: Peace Through Commerce Award 2012
- marital status: Married
- House: Sayed of Kayan
- Website: www.smninvestments.com

Sayed Sadat Mansoor Naderi (Dari: سید سعادت منصور نادری) (born 3 March 1977) is an Afghan entrepreneur and politician. He was Afghanistan's State Minister for Peace from 2020 to 2021 and Minister of Urban Development and Housing from 2015 - 2018.

== Early life ==
Sadat Mansoor Naderi born in Kabul on 3 March 1977 to Sayed Mansur Naderi, Vice President of Afghanistan during President Rabani's era. Naderi's paternal grandfather, Sayed Nader Kayani, was a well known spiritual leader and famous author/poet. His works consist of a collection of 56 books currently held in Naderi's cultural centre in Kabul as well as some archived at the Congress Library in Washington DC.

== Education ==
Naderi's primary years were spent in Afghanistan. In 1988, at the age of twelve, he relocated to England to continue his senior school education. During high school, Naderi was dedicated to sports and often competed in field events. He was a member of the under 18 British team for hammer. He was also a member of the Harrow volleyball county team. Naderi was also an active member in football, rugby and basketball. At university he was awarded a First Class BA Honours Degree in International Business and Economics in 1999.

== Business ==
Two years after the fall of the Taliban, Naderi returned to his home country Afghanistan in 2003. He invested in different sectors such as fuel distribution, retail distribution, insurance, construction, mining and leasing.

Naderi established Sadaf Petroleum in 2005, whose core business activities involve supplying fuel to both the private and public sector. Company clients included the US Army, Afghan Army, Afghan National Police, telecom companies and embassies among others.

Noticing a huge gap in the market, in 2007 Naderi established Insurance Corporation of Afghanistan (ICA), which was to be the first privately owned insurance company in Afghanistan working closely with A+ rated syndicate Lloyd's of London.

In 2008, Naderi also set up the chain of Supermarkets named Finest Superstores in Kabul city and other major cities across Afghanistan.

== Political background ==
Naderi's family has a political background. His father, Sayed Mansur Naderi is the leader of the Afghan Ismaili sect who has served as a vice-president during Mujahideen governance and was a representative in Afghan Lower House for two rounds. His younger sister Farkhunda Zahra Naderi, as well as his cousin, Dawood Naderi have also served as Afghan Parliamentarians.

Sayed Jafar Naderi, Sadat's elder brother was the Governor of Baghlan province in 1990s. His story was filmed by Jeff B. Harmon in 1989 and documented under Warlord of Kayan. He also served as the security advisor for Abdul Rashid Dostum, First Vice for Afghan President Ashraf Ghani Ahmadzai.

Sadat Naderi was introduced as the nominee for the Minister of Labour and Social Affairs. On 18 April 2015, Naderi was elected as the Minister of Urban Development and Housing. He obtained 202 votes of confidence out of 239 from the Afghan parliamentary assembly. This result has been the highest vote achieved by any Minister nominee since the Afghan nation's 2004 constitution was adopted.

On 22 April 2015, Naderi assumed office and resigned on 13 June 2018.

Naderi was also a member of Afghan peace negotiators representing the Afghan Ismaili sect.

Sadat Naderi was appointed as Afghanistan's State Minister for Peace on 31 August 2020 until 15 August 2021 when Afghan president fled the country and Taliban took over Afghanistan.

== Awards ==
1. Naderi was officially awarded the Peace through Commerce award for 2012 by the United States Department of Commerce in Dubai.
2. Naderi was awarded a medal for excellence for his performance as the Minister of Urban Development and Housing by the National Labors Committee on 2 April 2016.
3. ASJF honored Sayed Sadat Mansoor Naderi, member of the National Cricket Board of Directors and Afghanistan’s Minister of Urban Development and Housing for his continued contribution to sport and sports journalism in Afghanistan.
4. Afghan President, Mohammad Ashraf Ghani praised Sadat for best performance awarding him the national medal of King Wazir Mohammad Akbar Khan on 18 November 2017.
