= Khuda Gawah =

1992 film by Mukul S. Anand

- Theatrical release poster
- Directed by: Mukul S. Anand
- Written by: Abdul Salam Shaikh
- Screenplay by: Mukul S. Anand
- Story by: Santosh Saroj
- Produced by: Nazir Ahmed; Manoj Desai
- Starring: Amitabh Bachchan; Sridevi; Nagarjuna; Shilpa Shirodkar; Danny Denzongpa; Kiran Kumar
- Narrated by: Amitabh Bachchan
- Cinematography: W. B. Rao
- Edited by: R. Rajendran
- Music by: Laxmikant–Pyarelal
- Production company: Glamour Films
- Release date: 8 May 1992
- Running time: 193 minutes
- Country: India
- Language: Hindi
- Budget: ₹5.7 crore
- Box office: ₹17.05 crore

Khuda Gawah (transl. With God as Witness, also translated and released as God Is My Witness) is a 1992 Indian epic crime action film written and directed by Mukul S. Anand. The film features Amitabh Bachchan, Sridevi (in a dual role), Nagarjuna, Shilpa Shirodkar, Danny Denzongpa, and Kiran Kumar in pivotal roles. The music was composed by Laxmikant–Pyarelal. The film marked Sridevi and Bachchan's third collaboration after Inquilaab (1984) and Aakhree Raasta (1986). Set against the backdrop of Afghanistan and India, the film follows Badshah Khan, an Afghan warrior who travels to India to avenge the murder of his beloved Benazir's father. After completing his mission, he is falsely accused of another murder and subsequently imprisoned in India.

Made on a budget of ₹5.7 crore, Khuda Gawah was one of the most expensive Indian films at the time, second only to Ajooba (1991), which also starred Bachchan. It was released worldwide on 7 May 1992 and received critical acclaim for its performances, direction, and music, though its runtime faced some criticism. The film was the third highest-grossing Indian film of 1992, behind Beta and Deewana. It was also the first Indian film to use surround sound, earning a place in the Limca Book of Records.

The film was dubbed into Telugu and later adapted into a Pakistani television series of the same name. It remains one of the most-watched Indian films in Afghanistan. At the 38th Filmfare Awards, Khuda Gawah received nine nominations, including Best Film, Best Actor (Bachchan), Best Actress (Sridevi), and Best Supporting Actress (Shirodkar). It won four awards, including Best Director (Anand), Best Supporting Actor (Denzongpa), and Best Action.

== Plot ==
During a Buzkashi competition with a neighbouring tribe in Afghanistan, Badshah Khan (Bachchan) falls in love with Benazir (Sridevi) and wants to marry her. Benazir agrees to marry him, on the condition that he must bring her the head of Habibullah, who killed her father. Badshah Khan goes to India to search for Habibullah. He finds Habibullah in prison and breaks him out to take him back. He has the jailor Ranveer Sikhri (Gokhale) on his trail. He chops off Habibullah's head. When confronted by Ranveer, he tells him that he would be back in a month to receive punishment for taking Habibullah. Badshah goes back to Afghanistan and marries Benazir; after the time limit, he comes back to India and surrenders himself to Ranveer, whom he addresses as "Rajput Khan" and is jailed for five years. While Badshah Khan is away, his childhood friend Khuda Baksh assumes the role of a guardian for Benazir.

To avenge Habibullah's death, his brother Pasha kidnaps Heena, the daughter of jailor Ranveer, ransoming her in return for Badshah. Badshah finds out about this and escapes from jail; he confronts Pasha, only to have Inspector Aziz Mirza kill Ranveer Singh. With Ranveer Singh's daughter as a pawn in Pasha's hands, Badshah admits to killing Ranveer Singh and is sentenced to 15 years. When Aziz's wife, Salma, who thinks of Badshah as her brother, visits Badshah and ends up killing her husband to protect Badshah, Badshah takes the blame for that murder as well, since he believes that her son, Raja, needs her.

At that time, Benazir sends Khuda Baksh to check on Badshah. Due to his very extended stay in prison, Badshah makes Khuda Baksh promise to take care of his daughter Mehndi and tell his wife Benazir that he is now dead so that she can move on rather than wait for him. Benazir goes mad when she hears the news that her husband is dead.

On coming out of prison, Badshah meets with his now grown daughter, Mehndi, who has found out that her father is still alive and has come to India to look for him; the daughter of Ranveer Singh, Heena, who is also in the police force and knows all about Badshah's past and respects him as her uncle; and the son of Inspector Aziz Mirza, Inspector Raja Mirza, who has found out that it was Badshah who had killed his father and is out for vengeance. In a twist of fate, Raja is in love with Mehndi, even though he wants to kill her father.

Pasha, now a major crime lord, gets involved. Benazir and Khuda Baksh are kidnapped by him. The truth is eventually revealed to Raja about his father, and he joins hands with Badshah and Heena to kill their mutual enemy. Badshah and Benazir grab one arm each of Pasha as they ride on separate horses, like the beginning of the film, and throw him into a huge rock, killing him. They ride off into the sunset, finally together.

== Cast ==
- Amitabh Bachchan as Badshah Khan (Also Narrator)
- Sridevi as Benazir / Mehndi (Double Role)
- Nagarjuna as Inspector Raja Mirza
- Shilpa Shirodkar as Inspector Heena
- Danny Denzongpa as Khudabaksh
- Kiran Kumar as Pasha
- Bharat Kapoor as Aziz Mirza
- Anjana Mumtaz as Salma Mirza
- Vikram Gokhale as Ranveer Sikhri
- Beena Banerjee as Ranveer Sikhri's Wife
- Surendra Pal as Humayan, Benazir Bodyguard
- Shammi as KhudaBaksh's Mother

== Filming ==
Khuda Gawah had lavish production values and was extensively shot in and around the cities of Kabul and Mazar-i-Sharif in Afghanistan as well as Nepal and India. Then-Afghan President Mohammad Najibullah, a fan of Bachchan and his allied leader, Sayed Mansur Naderi of Kayan Valley provided security from the Afghan Air Force during the 18-day shooting of the film in 1991. Amitabh Bachchan was also hosted by Sayed Mansur Naderi in his stronghold Kayan Valley and was gifted a rare horse. This movie was also shot in Jomsom, Mustang District of Nepal.

== Soundtrack ==
Khuda Gawah

Film score by Laxmikant–Pyarelal
- Released: 1992
- Genre: Soundtrack
- Length: 56:40
- Producer: Laxmikant–Pyarelal

The music is composed by Laxmikant–Pyarelal. Lyrics are penned by Anand Bakshi.

No.	Title	Singer(s)	Length
1.	"Tu Mujhe Kabool - 1"	Kavita Krishnamurthy, Mohammed Aziz	08:05
2.	"Tu Na Ja Mere Badshah"	Alka Yagnik, Mohammed Aziz	05:08
3.	"Rab Ko Yaad Karoon"	Kavita Krishnamurthy, Mohammed Aziz, Chorus	09:02
4.	"Mere Watan Mein Maine"	Alka Yagnik, Suresh Wadkar, Chorus	07:54
5.	"Main Aisi Cheez Nahin"	Kavita Krishnamurthy, Mohammed Aziz, Chorus	08:41
6.	"Deewana Mujhe Kar Gaya"	Alka Yagnik, Mohammed Aziz, Chorus	08:38
7.	"Sar Zameene Hindustan"	Amitabh Bachchan	01:07
8.	"Tu Mujhe Kabool - 2"	Lata Mangeshkar, Kavita Krishnamurthy	08:05
Total length:			56:40

== Reception ==
BBC reported that "It ran to packed houses for 10 weeks in Kabul".

== Awards ==
38th Filmfare Awards:

Won

- Best Director – Mukul S. Anand
- Best Supporting Actor – Danny Denzongpa
- Best Sound – Bhagat Singh Rathod & Kuldeep Sood

Nominated

- Best Film – Nazir Ahmed & Manoj Desai
- Best Actor – Amitabh Bachchan
- Best Actress – Sridevi
- Best Supporting Actress – Shilpa Shirodkar
- Best Villain – Kiran Kumar
- Best Female Playback Singer – Kavita Krishnamurthy for "Main Tujhe Kabool"

Awards
Preceded by Saudagar	Filmfare Award for Best Director; 1992	Succeeded by Damini
