= Sayed Jafar Naderi =

Controller of Baghlan Province

Security Advisor to First Afghan Vice President
- Incumbent
- Assumed office 17 November 2014

Personal details
- Born: Sayed Jafar Naderi; May 5, 1965 (age 61) Kayan, Dushi District, Baghlan Province, Kingdom of Afghanistan
- Party: National Solidarity Party of Afghanistan
- Parent: Sayed Mansur Naderi (father)
- Religion: Islam (Ismaili Shia)
- House: Sayed of Kayan

Sayed Jafar Naderi (born 1965) is an ethnic Sadat-Ismaili who controlled Baghlan Province of Afghanistan during the early 1990s. He was born in Kayan, Baghlan and is also known as Sayyid-e Kayan. The son of Sayed Mansoor Naderi, previous Vice-President of Afghanistan, Sayed Jafar Naderi went to school in England at age 10, after his father was made a political prisoner. He was sent to the United States at age 13 where he became known as Jeff Naderi.

== Biography ==
Sayed Jafar Naderi comes from a highly political family background. His father Sayed Mansur Naderi has been both the religious and political leader of Afghan Ismaili sector in the past 50 years. Jafar's younger brother Sadat Mansoor Naderi who is a business person who has served in Ashraf Ghani Ahmadzai's cabinet as Ministers at Urban Development and Housing and State Ministry for Peace. Sayed Jafar's younger sister Farkhunda Zahra Naderi was a member of Afghan Parliament and a well-known rights activist in the country. His one cousin Sayed Dawood Naderi was another parliamentarian elected from Kunduz province of Afghanistan.

According to The World's Most Dangerous Places, Jafar was rich when he returned to Afghanistan. He is considered one of the country's most brutal and notorious warlords.

He was quoted in The World's Most Dangerous Places as saying that he came to help the people of Baghlan, and the rest of the country. He risked his life to help his people, inspired by his father and grandfather who helped protect Afghanistan.

The 80th Division (Afghanistan) was reportedly formed from tribal militia in the second half of the Soviet–Afghan War. In 1989 it was the major formation in Baghlan Province, under Jafar's command, then 25 years old.

Jafar was the subject of the 1989 documentary "Warlord of Kayan" produced and directed by Jeff B. Harmon. The film won the Golden Gate Award at the San Francisco International Film Festival.

== Downfall of Najibullah's Regime ==
During the critical juncture following the Soviet Union's withdrawal from Afghanistan, Sayed Jafar Naderi emerged as a pivotal figure in the sequence of political and military upheavals that culminated in the ousting of President Najibullah's administration. A leading figure in the Ismaili community, Naderi, in collaboration with Abdul Rashid Dostam, Ahmad Shah Massoud and other leaders from non-Pashtun ethnic groups, spearheaded a mutiny that decisively compromised Najibullah's regime by severing its primary supply route from the erstwhile Soviet Union. This strategic maneuver precipitated the collapse of Najibullah's government, marking a watershed moment in the fraught history of Afghanistan.

In the wake of these events, Sayed Jafar Naderi, alongside his father, Sayed Mansur Naderi, an esteemed leader within Afghanistan's Ismaili community, played an instrumental role in founding the National Islamic Movement (NIM). The NIM was established as a political entity dedicated to championing the rights and representation of ethnic minorities that had historically been sidelined in the northern regions of Afghanistan. Advocating for the adoption of a federal governance structure, the movement aimed to facilitate a more equitable distribution of power within Afghanistan, mirroring the nation's rich ethnic and religious diversity. This endeavor represented a significant stride toward reshaping Afghanistan's political landscape, underscoring the critical need for inclusivity and the protection of minority rights as cornerstones of the country's path toward enduring stability and peace.

== Family political background ==
Sayed Jafar Naderi comes from a highly political family background. His father Sayed Mansur Naderi has been both the religious and political leader of Afghan Ismaili sector in the past 50 years.

Jafar's younger brother Sadat Mansoor Naderi who is a business person was appointed as Urban Development Minister by the president Ashraf Ghani Ahmadzai in 2015 and later in 2020, he was appointed as Minister at State Ministry for Peace.

Sayed Jafar's younger sister Farkhunda Zahra Naderi was a member of Afghan Parliament (2010–15) and a well-known rights activist in the country. She was then appointed as a senior advisor to the president Ashraf Ghani.

One of his cousin Sayed Dawood Naderi was another parliamentarian elected from Kunduz province of Afghanistan.

Jafar himself was appointed as security advisor to first vice president Abdul Rashid Dostum.

== Warlord of Kayan ==
Warlord of Kayan is a significant and popular documentary movie, filmed in 1989 by Jeff B. Harmon, featuring the political and social landscape of Baghlan during the civil wars. The former governor of Baghlan Sayed Jafar Naderi was chosen as the central character in this documentary. He, who was also known as Jeff Naderi outside the borders of Afghanistan, is the son of Sayed Mansur Naderi, an influential political and religious figure. The film won the Golden Gate Award at the San Francisco International Film Festival.

The documentary Warlord of Kayan is further complemented by revelations about Sayed Jafar Naderi's early years, particularly his transition from a youth in Allentown, Pennsylvania, to a key figure in Afghanistan's military and political arena. The Los Angeles Times article unveils Naderi's life from his schooling at Hiram W. Naderi's anecdotes from his time in Allentown—ranging from his involvement with local motorcycle gangs to his affinity for AC/DC's "Highway to Hell", and his claim of making the best french fries in Kayan—offer a unique glimpse into the personal history behind the warlord. These details not only humanize Naderi but also illustrate the complex interplay of cultural, familial, and geopolitical factors that propelled his eventual return to Afghanistan. By the age of 24, Naderi's leadership skills had propelled him to significant roles, including the governorship of Baghlan province and command of a substantial opposition force, underscoring his strategic and pragmatic approach in the midst of Afghanistan's turbulent politics and conflict.

The film was also featured in the Sunday Times magazine and a picture of Sayed Jafar Naderi taken by Jeff B. Harmon during one of the filmmaking scenes had gone on the magazine's front cover. Hard copies of magazine collected by Magazine Canteen are still available.

== See also ==
- Sayed Mansur Naderi
- Sadat Mansoor Naderi
- Farkhunda Zahra Naderi
- Sayed Kayan
- Kayan, Baghlan
- Warlord of Kayan
