= Alema Alema =

Afghan politician

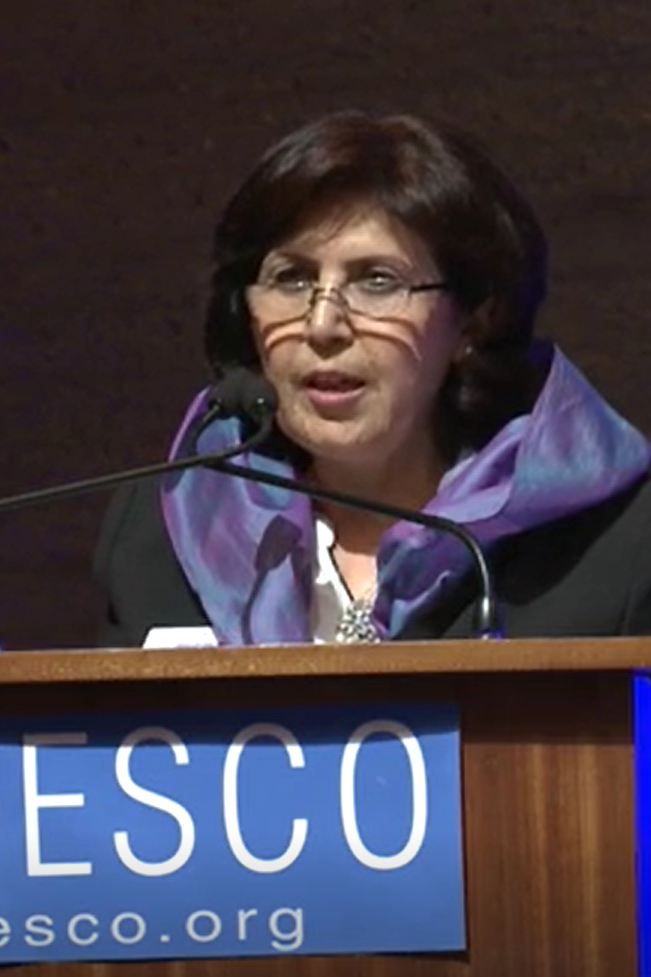
- Born: 1964; Kabul
- Education: Leipzig University
- Occupations: Politician, scholar, philosopher
- Awards: 100 Women (2021)

Alema Alema (born 1964), often referred to as Dr. Alema, is an Afghan politician. She served as deputy minister for human rights and civil society in the State Ministry for Peace.

Alema Alema was born on 1964 in Kabul. She earned a PhD from Leipzig University in 1990. She founded and headed the Women's Political Participation Committee, an organization dedicated to increasing political participation amongst women in Afghanistan and was responsible for the "Who is my vote for?" campaign. Following the Taliban regaining control of Afghanistan in 2021, Alema moved to Germany and spoke out about the Taliban's treatment of women. She worked for the German pro-immigration organisation Pro Asyl.

In 2021, Alema Alema was selected for the annual BBC 100 Women list.
