= Ramazan Juma Zada =

Hazara politician from Afghanistan

Member Afghanistan Parliament

Personal details
- Born: 1978 (age 46–47); Shibar, Bamyan, Afghanistan
- Political party: National Unity Party of Afghanistan
- Occupation: Politician
- Ethnicity: Hazara

Ramazan Juma Zada (Dari: رمضان جمعه زاده) (born 1978) is an ethnic Hazara politician from Afghanistan, who was the representative of the people of Kabul province in the 16th term of the Afghanistan Parliament. He was representing the National Unity Party of Afghanistan in the Afghanistan National Assembly. He was a candidate for the Afghanistan Parliamentary election in 2019, but due to a change in the political atmosphere against the Ismailis in Afghanistan, he could not retain his seat.

== Early life ==
Ramazan Juma Zada was born on 1978 in Shibar District of Bamyan province. He completed his secondary education at "Pul-e-Khumri High School" in Baghlan province and entered the Faculty of Medicine of Balkh University.

== See also ==
- List of Hazara people
