= Jeff B. Harmon =

American actor

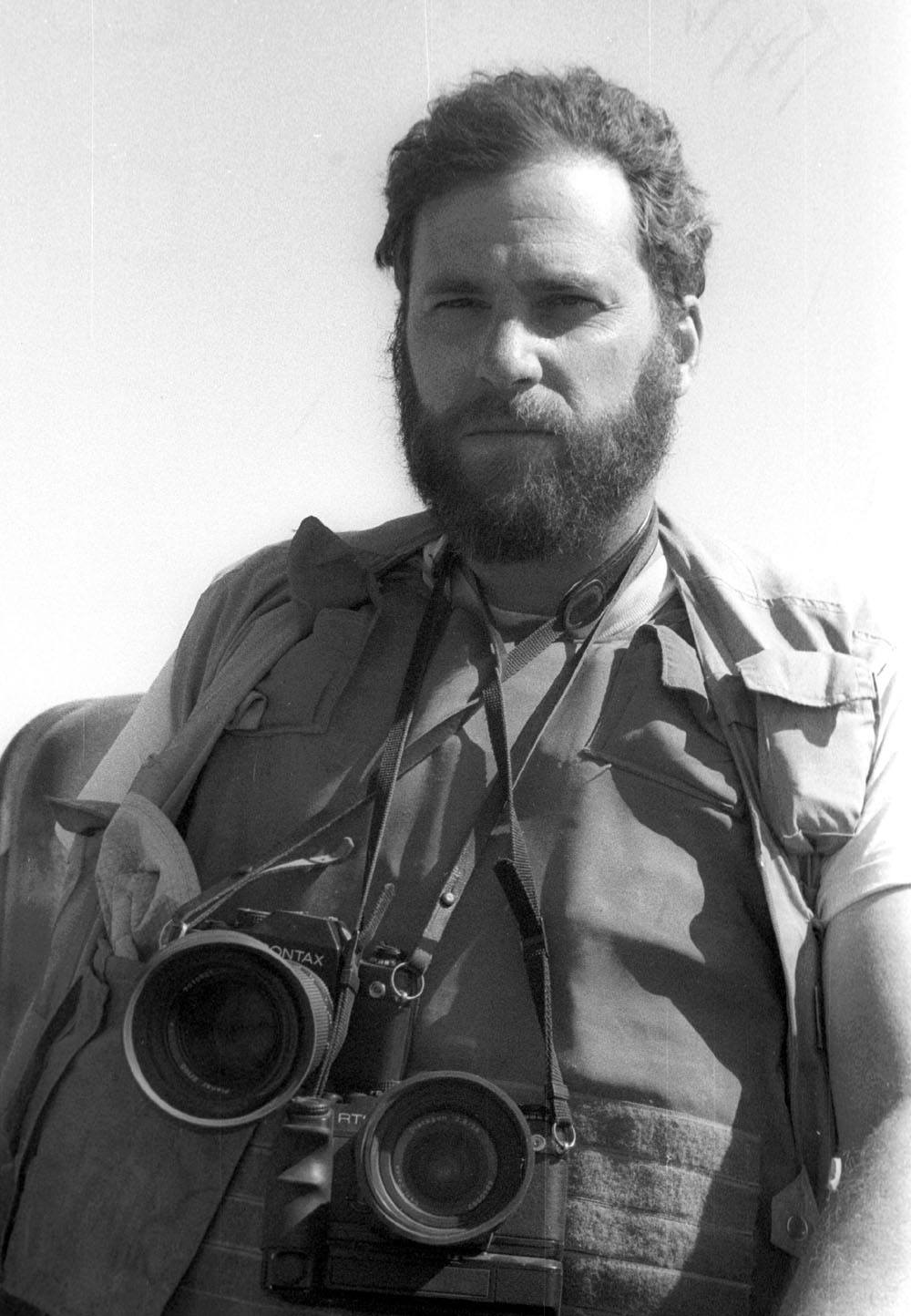
- Harmon during the filming of a documentary in Afghanistan in 1988; photo by Mikhail Evstafiev
- Born: Jeff B. Harmon; December 31, 1953 (age 72); United States
- Occupations: Film director, actor, songwriter, writer, producer, photographer
- Years active: 1974–present
- Notable credit(s): Jihad: Afghanistan's Holy War; Afgan; Warlord of Kayan
- Parent: Larry Harmon (father)

Jeff B. Harmon (born December 31, 1953) is an American film director, writer, and producer. He is also an actor, photographer, and song writer.

As a journalist and war correspondent, he penetrated the Nazi underground in Paraguay while searching for Dr. Josef Mengele, right-wing death squads in El Salvador, covered Emperor Bokassa's coronation, the fall of Idi Amin, the war in Afghanistan (from both the Mujahideen and Soviet sides), and Saddam Hussein's Iraq.

Working as an independent filmmaker together with British cameraman, Alexander Lindsay, in 1989 Harmon completed his Afghan Trilogy, which included the documentaries Jihad: Afghanistan's Holy War, which won a Royal Television Society award and an ACE award, Afgan and Warlord of Kayan.

Jihad took over one year to make and was filmed clandestinely in different provinces of Afghanistan, including in Kunar and Kandahar. It showed combat and daily life under Soviet occupation, as seen through the eyes of Haji Abdul Latif, the 'Lion of Kandahar' and his Mujahideen fighters. Jihad won various awards including the prestigious Royal Television Journalism Award, the ACE Award (the highest award in US cable television), the Blue Ribbon at the American Film & Video Festival, and CINE's Golden Eagle. Critics called the documentary an 'instructive, pithy, not boring and an important piece of journalism that the American public and decision-makers should view'.

Harmon and Lindsay were among the very few who later managed to create another documentary, Afgan, about the same war, but this time shot from the side of the Soviet army, receiving unprecedented access to the troops and even flying on missions with the Spetsnaz. Afgan won the Blue Ribbon at the American Film & Video Festival.

Warlord of Kayan tells the story of Sayed Jafar Naderi, the son of an Afghan Ismaili leader and a former member of a hippie motorcycle gang in Allentown who used to work in McDonald's and play the drums in a heavy metal band. He later became a provincial governor and chief of a 12,000-man private army in Afghanistan. He fought with the Northern Alliance against the Taliban. The film won the Golden Gate Award at the San Francisco International Film Festival. The documentary has been mostly filmed in Kayan Valley of Baghlan Province, when Sayed Mansur Naderi, the head of Afghanistan Ismailis had a significant military and political influence in the Northern Afghanistan. troops by 1989, but at the same time secretly collaborated with insurgent groups, allowing them to operate in Baghlan provided they did not interfere with logistics transport in the region.

Just before the start of the first Gulf War, Jeff Harmon travelled to Iraq to film the day-to-day life and the cult of Saddam Hussein. His documentary, Saddam's Iraq depicted a prosperous and sophisticated society in which every aspect of life was coloured by 'love' for the 'Great Leader'. Darkly ironic, the film captured the surreal and Orwellian nature of life under Saddam Hussein.

Critics said Harmon's 1996 low-budget satiric musical comedy Isle of Lesbos was like Li'l Abner meeting The Rocky Horror Picture Show, and that it was a high-spirited, low-budget attempt at an old-style Technicolor musical that plays like a gay Mardi Gras outing. It portrayed a closet lesbian who reaches the point of desperation on her wedding day in her redneck hometown of Bumfuck, Arkansas, shoots herself and is instantly sucked through her mirror and into a lesbian fantasy land. When her enraged parents try to get her back, the Sisters at the Isle of Lesbos put up a fight. The film premiered at the Berlin International Film Festival. Harmon spoke about the film in an interview with Harold Channer.

Harmon wrote, produced and directed a variety series for Brazilian television, O Circo De Bozo, which was broadcast live to evoke the heyday of 1950s television. This series won two Brazilian Emmys. His father is the late Larry Harmon, who owned licensing rights to Bozo the Clown.

In 2014, Harmon published his autobiography, Picaro: Psychopaths, Warlords, and a Rogue Journalist on the Dark Side of History. One review pointed out that "although written over thirty years ago to Pícaro’s modern readers, his stories of Afghanistan in particular provide much needed clarity behind the American military’s current battles in the same region".

His writings and photographs have been published in various periodicals including Life Magazine, Harper's, the Sunday Times, Independent Magazine, National Geographic, Newsweek, U.S. News & World Report, Penthouse, Gallery, Icon and The Daily Telegraph.

== Filmography ==
- 1983: The Front Line
- 1986: Jihad: Afghanistan's Holy War
- 1989: Afgan
- 1989: Warlord of Kayan
- 1991: Saddam's Iraq
- 1996: Isle of Lesbos
