= Larry Harmon =

American entertainer (1925–2008)

- Born: Lawrence Weiss; January 2, 1925; Toledo, Ohio
- Died: July 3, 2008 (aged 83); Los Angeles, California
- Known for: Bozo the Clown
- Children: 4, including Jeff B. Harmon

Lawrence Weiss (January 2, 1925 – July 3, 2008), better known by the stage name Larry Harmon and as his alter ego Bozo the Clown, was an American entertainer. Weiss had four children, including filmmaker Jeff Harmon.

== Biography ==
Harmon was born to Jewish parents in Toledo, Ohio, and raised in Cleveland. During World War II, he served as a private in the Army. On returning, he wanted to become a medical doctor, until he met entertainer Al Jolson. According to Harmon's autobiography The Man Behind the Nose, Jolson told him, "Being a doctor of medicine is honorable, but you'll touch so many more lives as a doctor of laughter!" Harmon instead attended the University of Southern California, where he majored in theater and performed in the Spirit of Troy marching band.

Harmon began making the first of thousands of appearances as Bozo the Clown after attending a casting call in the late 1940s. In 1957, Harmon purchased the licensing rights to the Bozo character from Capitol Records, which had promoted the character on its children's albums as "Bozo the Capitol Clown", and he aggressively marketed the property. By the late 1950s, Harmon had licensed local Bozo TV shows in nearly every major U.S. market, as well as in other countries. He also produced and provided the voice for a series of Bozo animated cartoons intended to be shown with the live-action show.

Harmon's animation studio also produced eighteen Popeye cartoons in 1960 as part of a larger TV syndication package.

Harmon voiced the title character in the English dub of Hergé's Adventures of Tintin.

In 1961, Harmon bought the merchandising rights to the likenesses of Laurel and Hardy. Five years later, he promoted a Laurel and Hardy TV cartoon-short series called A Laurel and Hardy Cartoon, animated by Hanna-Barbera Productions. Harmon performed Stan Laurel's voice in that series, with Jim MacGeorge as Hardy.

In 1984, Harmon stood as a write-in candidate in the presidential election, with the aim of encouraging people to vote. Only Arizona reported the number of votes that he received: 21. (The total number of U.S. write-in votes was 19,315 or 0.02 percent of the vote.)

On New Year's Day 1996, Harmon dressed as Bozo for the first time in 10 years, appearing in the Rose Parade in Pasadena, California.

In 1999, Harmon co-produced and co-directed the live-action feature The All New Adventures of Laurel & Hardy in For Love or Mummy, starring Bronson Pinchot as Laurel and Gailard Sartain as Hardy. Intended to be the first of a series, it was released direct-to-video, and no sequels were made.

Harmon wrote an autobiography titled The Man Behind the Nose: Assassins, Astronauts, Cannibals, and Other Stupendous Tales, published in 2010 by Igniter Books. One of Harmon's ex-wives disputed the memoir's veracity.

Harmon died of congestive heart failure in his home in Los Angeles, California, on July 3, 2008. He is interred in Mount Sinai Memorial Park Cemetery in Los Angeles.

He was married four times and had four children: filmmaker Jeff Harmon and three daughters.

== See also ==
- Larry Harmon Pictures, his production company
