= Baha'uddin Jan =

Baha'uddin Jan was the pir naqshbandi (Sufi leader) of the Aymāq people of Purchaman District, Farah. He, along with his two sons, was killed following the communist Saur Revolution at the end of the 1970s, by security forces from Kabul who were eliminating political and religious opposition to the new regime.
