= Pur Chaman District =

Pur Chaman پُرچمن
- District
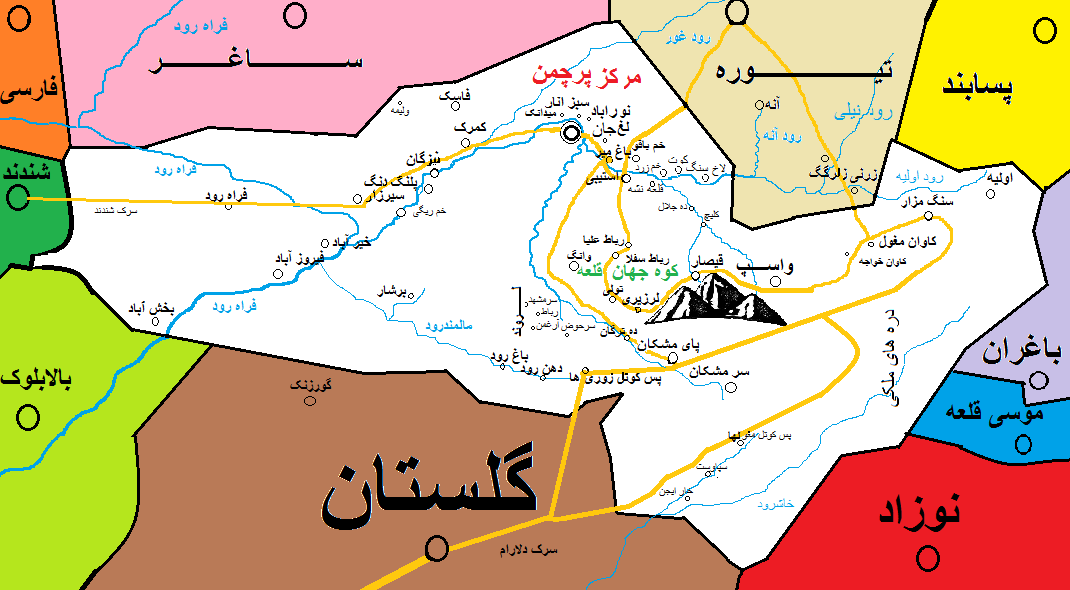

- Location within Afghanistan
- Coordinates: 33°08′24″N 63°51′36″E
- Country: Afghanistan
- Province: Farah

Population (2020)
  - Total: 115,000

Pur Chaman (also transliterated as Purchaman or Porchaman) is a mountainous district in Farah province, Afghanistan. Its population is approximately 95% Pashtuns with a Others minority. The main village, also called Purchaman 33°8′29″N 63°51′41″E is situated at 1431 m altitude.

== Recent History ==
In recent years, Pur Chaman has faced significant security challenges. Until 2016, the district was relatively peaceful, but increasing instability under the Ashraf Ghani administration led to a deterioration of security conditions. The Taliban capitalized on this, gradually gaining influence and ultimately establishing control over parts of the district.

One key figure associated with Taliban taking over Pur Chaman was Abdul Qayum Rahimi, the former governor of Herat Province. Allegations suggested that at the time, Rahimi, in collaboration with central authorities, orchestrated actions that exacerbated divisions among the local populace, leading to weakened the Ashraf Ghani government control. The Taliban’s incursions in Pur Chaman during that period resulted in heavy casualties, including the deaths of 140 Afghan National Army personnel during a counter-offensive to reclaim the district.

== Geography and Economy ==
Pur Chaman is known for its picturesque landscapes, featuring lush green areas and agricultural fields. The district’s economy is predominantly agrarian, with residents engaged in farming, beekeeping, and small-scale trade. The cultivation of poppy for opium production has also been reported, driven by economic necessity and limited government oversight.

== Religious Significance ==
Historically, Pur Chaman served as a center for Naqshbandi Sufi activities, particularly under the leadership of Baha'uddin Jan, a prominent pir of the Aimaq ethnic group. This role diminished following Baha'uddin Jan’s assassination during the Nur Muhammad Taraki regime in the late 1970s.

== Governance Challenges ==
The district has experienced significant administrative and political instability, with frequent changes in local leadership. This instability has fostered grievances among residents and hindered development projects. Allegations of corruption and drug trafficking have further eroded trust in government representatives.

== Demographics ==
People of pur chaman are Pashtun.
