= Farkhunda Zahra Naderi =

Afghan politician and women's rights activist

Farkhunda Zahra Naderi فرخنده زهرا نادری
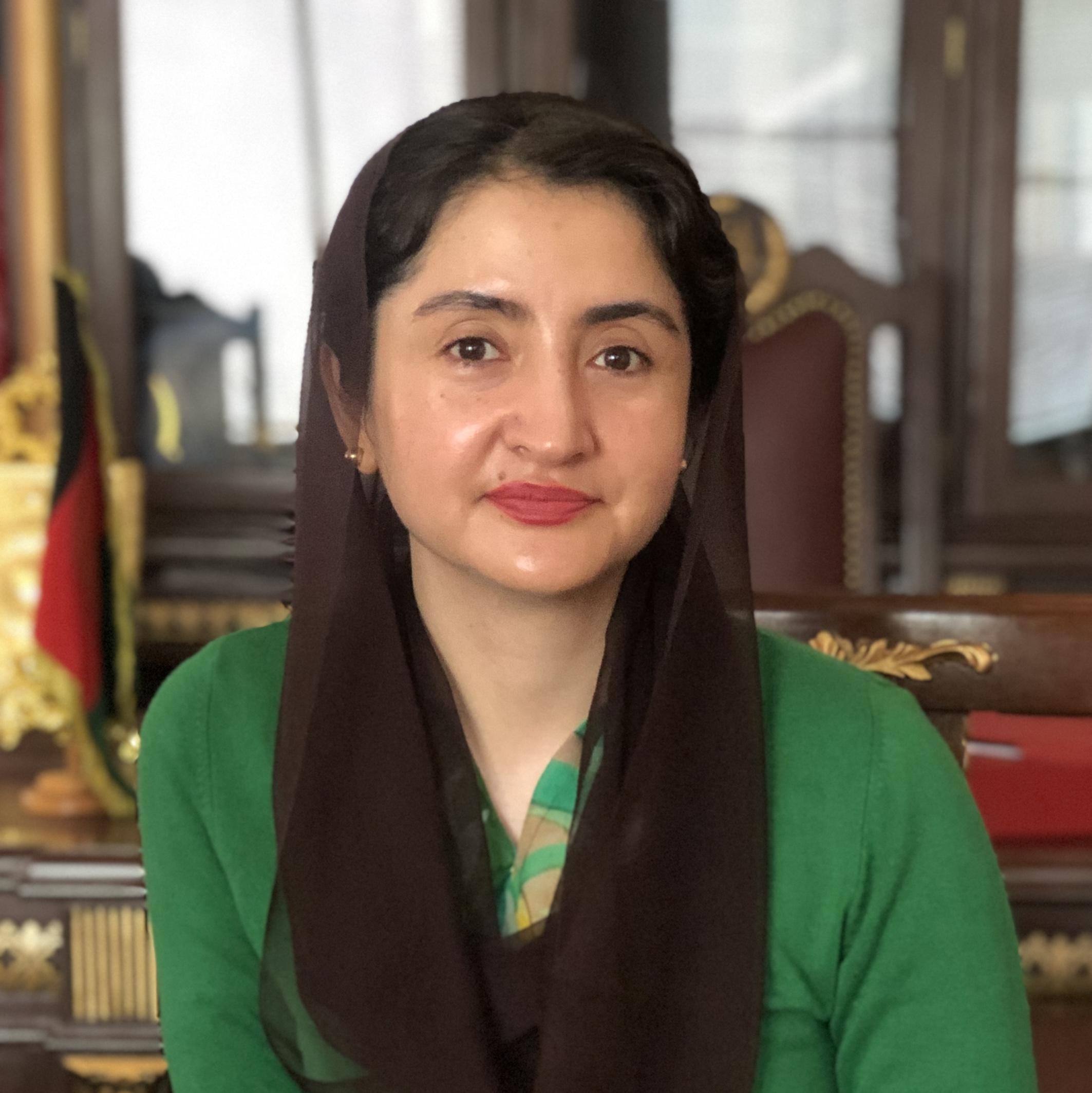
- Naderi in October 2019

Member of Afghanistan High Council for National Reconciliation
- In office 22 August 2020 – 15 August 2021

Senior Advisor to President Mohammad Ashraf Ghani
- In office December 2016 – November 2018

Member of Afghanistan National Council (Lower House, Term 16)
- In office 2010–2015

Personal details
- Born: Farkhunda Zahra; 19 April 1981 (age 45)
- Party: National Solidarity Party of Afghanistan
- Parent: Sayed Mansur Naderi (father)
- Education: Harrow College; Westminster International University in Tashkent (BA)
- Religion: Islam (Ismaili Shia)
- Awards: N Peace Award 2012
- House: Sayed of Kayan
- Website: Personal website

Farkhunda Zahra Naderi (Dari: فرخنده زهرا نادری; born 19 April 1981) is an Afghan politician and women's rights activist. She has been a member of Afghanistan's High Council for National Reconciliation (HCNR), chaired by Abdullah Abdullah. She previously served as a senior advisor to President Ashraf Ghani on United Nations Affairs. From 2010 to 2015, she was a member of the House of the People.

Naderi is a recipient of the 2012 N-Peace Award and a graduate of the Young Global Leaders program.

== Early life and education ==
Naderi was born on 19 April 1981 in Kabul. She is the daughter of Sayed Mansoor Naderi, the incumbent Sayed of Kayan and a leader of the Ismaili Hazaras Community in Afghanistan.

She received her primary and secondary education in Baghlan and Kabul provinces, and completed her baccalaureate at Harrow College in Harrow, London, in 2001. Naderi later studied law at Westminster International University in Tashkent, graduating in 2007.

== Politician and activist ==
=== 2010 Parliamentary Election ===
Naderi through her parliamentary campaign wanted to define a responsible and professional political campaign which could reflect the values of democracy and professionalism within a traditional political environment. Naderi regarded the political Campaign as a responsibility to candidates to raise awareness about democratic values such as democratic governance, social contract, the role of parliament and check and balance with their constituency.Therefore, her campaign included a range of methods and approaches such as organising theatre performance to educate the voters on how to vote, street campaigns, meeting people at her campaign office, organising public events, writing on newspapers to explain her views, passing message on radios and eventually appearing on tv to pass her messages. She organised campaign rallies in different parts of Kabul City, sending campaigners knocking on citizens' doors to provide them with information about the candidate and her plan.

Naderi also took the challenge to run officially as the only political party candidate from the National Solidarity Party of Afghanistan from Kabul province in the 2010 parliamentary election because at the time the majority of members of different political parties run as independent candidates, rather than using the name of their political parties. This was done due to the unpopular image and notion of political parties from the past. Farkhunda Zahra Naderi argued if the existence of political party is regarded to be a heinous act within the political culture of Afghanistan, then Afghans must not participate in political parties at all, but if it is not, then why the members of political parties hide their political identity to mislead the public in order to get votes, instead of bringing public awareness regarding their political agenda and people's political rights. Moreover, Naderi entered into the 2010 election campaigns with a challenging slogan of "Burka, the window of power; چادری، دریچه قدرت" and there were no pictures of her in the advertising materials and posters, as she wanted to encourage the public to concentrate on women candidates' platforms rather than their faces.

=== Women's Presence in the Supreme Court ===
At university, Naderi conducted a research on the study of women's role within Afghan power, she was convinced the absence of Afghan women in the Supreme Court is the real challenge for the symbolic presence of women in the Afghan politics. In the 2010 parliamentary campaign, Naderi promised to fight for women's participation in the Supreme Court of Afghanistan.

Naderi succeeded to break the taboo by raising voice in the parliament, working with civil society to political groups from national to international level. Eventually, a woman for the first time in the history of Afghanistan was introduced in the Supreme Court by President Ghani in National Unity Government of Afghanistan (NUG).

=== Inter-parliamentary Union ===
In 2013, Naderi changed the role of Afghan Parliament from a participatory delegates to a politically active players by entering the election in Inter-Parliamentary Union and being elected as the first Afghan MP to one of the Three Standing Committees; the Committee on Democracy and Human Rights in Inter-Parliamentary Union. In March 2013, Naderi obtained the membership of third Standing Committee (Human Rights & Democracy) at IPU's 128th Assembly held in Ecuador. In the election between Afghanistan, Australia and Iran representatives, Naderi got 28 votes out of 52, while the Australian and Iranian parliamentarians got 20 and 3 votes respectively. In March 2014, at the 130th Assembly of IPU, Naderi strengthened the role of Afghan parliament further by becoming the President of the mentioned committee through another election. Naderi left the parliament after its 5th year, because according to Afghan Constitution Afghan Parliament's legal term was terminated, but instead of holding a parliamentary election, President Ghani extended its term by passing a decree. Naderi found this action in violation of the social contract between people and the MPs and in breach of democratic values.

=== Advisory Role to the President ===
Farkhunda Zahra Naderi worked as a senior advisor to President Ashraf Ghani on UN affairs, from December 2016 to November 2018. In this position her mission was to prepare the One UN document. Naderi with her UN counterparts prepared the document of One UN with two attachments of mutual accountability and Action plan to the President. The document directs the activities of UN agencies in a more coordinated, effective and sustainable manner. She developed the One UN document with an aim to establish coordination, accountability, transparency and efficiency for the aids and operations of the UN agencies in Afghanistan. The document also focuses on the adaption of the UN agencies programs with the priorities and strategies of the Afghan people. The document was completed and sent for Presiden's signature in early 2018 to be later send for execution, but it was never signed; and no further clarification was provided about it. Furthermore, Naderi opened the door of the arg (the palace) to general public especially to youth by establishing The Arg and Citizen Debate and Citizen Wall, and the Civil Society Dialogue, co-organizing it with the UN Women.

Naderi was appointed to Senior Advisory position via presidential decree released in December 2016. She resigned from her post as the senior advisor to President Ashraf Ghaniover what she called to be as "serious disagreements". It took eight months for her to resign from Arg. However, when she held a press conference in Gmic, after her resignation in November 2018, she shared the report of her work as the senior advisor to the president with the public.But she avoided to answer media's questions regarding her resignation, instead she encouraged them to hold her accountable for the performance of her service in Arg

=== Peace Award UN ===
Miss Naderi was nominated by UNDP for the 2012 N-Peace Award. She won the award through an electronic voting system. Naderi nominated a female Afghan parliamentarian, Masuada Karokhi, and campaigned for her. Then in 2013 MP Karokhi won the N-Peace award.

Farkhunda Zahra Naderi was the only female representative from Afghanistan who participated in three consecutive unofficial Chantilly Conferences at Paris in 2010 and 2012.

=== Chadari Design: Chadari Vs Lungi or Peace Vs War ===
Chadari Design is a symbolic brand established in August 2019 by Farkhunda Zahra Naderi with an aim to support and empower women. It was inaugurated through 'Chadari Vs Lungi' (Burka VS Turban) or 'Peace Vs War' exhibition in Kabul. Miss Naderi argues that the Chadari design within its creations and artistic work attempts to bring the focus first on the women's rights as a core notion of "human rights" and" equality" then it draws attention on the types of dressing women choose to wear.

The exhibition became popular as well as controversial within the country. The exhibition along with Farkhunda Zahra Naderi's speech created debates and discussions among Afghan citizens, young women, university students lecturers, artists and political, social and cultural communities. The artistic collection of "Chadari Vs. Lungi" represented the two opposing but related phenomenon of peace and war. In the exhibition, Farkhunda Zahra Naderi as the designer and creator of Chadari Design and the organizer of the exhibition depicted the various forms of patriarchal violence from traditional to modern styles against women in Afghanistan but promoted justice and rule of law for bringing sustainable peace. She exhibited the complex relations between peace and war, justice and revenge and men and women. The exhibition started with the cliché of women being victims and men the violators of her rights but within the details of her work she challenged the same concept (that gender per se cannot be the source of violence) by highlighting the role of justice through accountability and transparency in power regardless of gender differences to prevent the vicious circle of revenge and war in order to bring equality. Therefore, it is not only men who create violence but women also will be the cause of violence if she is also given power but there is no system and mechanism to hold her accountable. Hence, according to Naderi, it is the existence of injustice through unlimited, uncontrolled and unaccountable power of individuals/groups which can be the cause of violence from domestic to national level.

The exhibition of Chadari VS Lungi which was addressing the social and cultural perspective towards femininity and masculinity divisions, with its diverse and detailed designs and artwork created interest and debate among Afghans in different walks of life. The exhibition was opened to general public for two days where from traditional to modern Afghan men and women came for its visit.

Since it was held at the time of the presidential campaign where the competition among the candidates were at its peak, even though Farkhunda Zahra Naderi chose to work on peace process instead of joining the election, but due to her political background her art work was attacked by the electoral rivalry atmosphere. Therefore, President Ghani's team took the advantage of time to misinterpret her speech and exhibition in social media by organising a negative campaign by their social media activists by spreading wrong information and allegations against her. Therefore, political figures loyal to President Ghani, intensified the negative reactions towards the exhibition.

Hence, some senators in the House of Senate (Meshrano Jirga) who were under the influence of government accused Ms Naderi of insulting the men's traditional clothing and introduced her to the attorney office to be prosecuted.

=== Women's rights activist ===
Farkhunda Zahra Naderi is a women's rights and human rights activist. From community to national level she fought against different forms of violence against women and raised voice not only regarding the existence of violences against women but also regarding the awareness of the EVAW Law. She worked on the improvement of the EVAW Law in the women's rights commission, but when she realised as a draft the EVAW law would not get votes and its gains will be lost, she worked to support the implementation of the law. She used her oversight role as an MP to make the relevant governmental bodies mainly ministries accountable for the implementation of its articles.

Naderi was also actively engaged in Farkhunda Malikzada's case and supported her case throughout. She also followed up Malikzada's case in the court by attending the public hearings until the verdict of the court was passed. She expressed her objections to the verdict of the court as she believed the court acted in a partial manner towards accused people being involved in [Farkhunda Malikzada]'s case.
