= Sayed Mansur Naderi =

Politician from Afghanistan

Sayed Mansoor Naderi سید منصور نادری

Incumbent Sayed of Kayan Political Warlord

Personal details
- Born: Sayed Mansoor Naderi; January 12, 1936 (age 90) Kingdom of Afghanistan
- Party: National Solidarity Party of Afghanistan
- Spouse(s): Mastoora, Parween, and two more wives.
- Children: Sayed Jafar Naderi; Sadat Mansoor Naderi; Farkhunda Zahra Naderi; Sayed Jawid Naderi; Sayed Atash Naderi; Suraya Naderi; Sayed Ershad Naderi
- Parent: Sayed Nader Shah Kayani (father)
- Religion: Ismaili
- House: Sayed of Kayan
- Ethnicity: Sadat

Sayed Mansur Naderi is the incumbent Sayed of Kayan; leader of the Shi'a community of Afghanistan centred in Baghlan Province and also in other parts of Afghanistan. This community although Shia is smaller than the mainstream Twelver Shia community in Afghanistan.

Naderi served the Afghan monarchy, later the communist government and served as vice president during Majahiden government and in the 1980s, was expelled from his region by the Taliban, and returned to Baghlan following the fall of the Taliban. He was elected to the Wolesi Jirga (lower house of the Afghan Parliament) in 2005, and was the founder of the ismaili-based National Solidarity Party of Afghanistan (Paiwand Milli).

His son Sayed Jafar Naderi also achieved military advances in Baghlan during Soviet-Afghan War, becoming popular as Warlord of Kayan and later appointed as Governor of Baghlan Province post the Soviet occupation of Afghanistan.

His son Sayed Jafar Naderi was appointed security advisor to Afghan first vice president Abdul Rashid Dostum in 2014.

Sayed Mansoor's daughter Farkhunda Zahra Naderi is a well-known rights activist in Afghanistan and also serves as member of Afghan parliament elected in 2010 with the highest vote from Kabul province.

Sadat Mansoor Naderi, his another son nominated by Afghan president Ashraf Ghani as Urban Development Minister, assumed office on April 22, 2015. After that in 2020, he was appointed as Minister at Afghanistan's State Ministry for Peace.

== Monarchy era ==
During the Afghan monarchy, Sayed Mansur served as Vice President of Parliament under King Mohammed Zahir Shah.

== Soviet era ==
Following the transition to the communist Democratic Republic of Afghanistan and the Soviet invasion, while the Tajiks and Pashtuns of Baghlan aligned themselves with the insurgent Jamiat-e Islami and Hezb-e Islami Gulbuddin, Sayed Mansur received government funding and arms to form a local militia of his traditionally Ismaili supporters. He became a general and governor of the province with his militia reaching 13,000-18,000 troops by 1989, but at the same time secretly collaborated with insurgent groups, allowing them to operate in Baghlan provided they did not interfere with logistics transport in the region.

== Military Power and Political Influence ==
In the tumultuous period of the 1980s and early 1990s, amid the Soviet occupation and subsequent political unrest, Sayed Mansoor Naderi distinguished himself as a key figure in Baghlan province. As the Ismaili spiritual leader from the Doshi district, Sayed Mansoor's impact reached far beyond spiritual leadership, extending into significant military and political spheres. Following directives from President Babrak Karmal to establish ethnic militias for safeguarding critical supply routes from mujahedin assaults, Naderi formed a formidable militia. This force was instrumental in asserting control over Baghlan, a vital conduit for Soviet logistical support to Kabul and the southern regions of Afghanistan, marking a crucial phase in the local military and governance landscape.

Sayed Mansur Naderi and his son, Sayed Jafar Naderi who was later known as Warlord of Kayan, expanded upon their family's legacy through the establishment of a pro-government qaumi militia regiment in 1984. This unit's progression to a regular army division, known as the 80th infantry division, equipped with advanced artillery and tanks, underscored the Naderis' escalating military capabilities. By 1992, with a command over an 18,000-member force, Sayed Jafar Naderi negotiated strategic alliances with mujahedin factions, notably with Ahmad Shah Masoud, a prominent Jamiat military commander. This alliance, which was mutually beneficial, allowed mujahedin forces access to vital military supplies while consolidating the Naderis' stronghold in Pul-e-Khumri. Following the downfall of President Najibullah in 1992, the Naderis, leveraging support from Abdul Rashid Dostum, an influential Uzbek warlord, participated in crafting a power-sharing agreement with local mujahedin leaders associated with Jamiat and Hizb. This arrangement led to the integration of various mujahedin factions into the pre-existing political and military frameworks of the former government. Under this coalition, the Naderi family adeptly maneuvered through the complex political and military terrains, maintaining their prominence in Baghlan until the ascendancy of the Taliban in 1997.

== The 80th Military Division ==
The establishment of the 80th Division marks a significant episode in the military annals of Afghanistan, particularly in the concluding phase of the Soviet conflict. Originating post-1988 as a regiment or brigade under the auspices of the Ismaili community and the Afghan Interior Ministry, this unit underwent significant transformation to become a prominent military entity within Baghlan Province. Commanded by Sayed Jafar Naderi, who was just 25 at the time, with the spiritual and political backing of his father, Sayed Mansoor Naderi, the division played a crucial role in maintaining the integrity of essential supply lines to Kabul, notably the Salang Tunnel route. This underscored the indispensable role of the Ismaili community in ensuring regional stability amid the challenges faced by the PDPA regime.

Beyond its foundational duties, the 80th Division was instrumental in the security and stability of northeastern provinces, including Baghlan, Samangan, Kunduz, and Badakhshan. Its strategic importance extended to safeguarding the Salang Pass, a critical artery facilitating transit between the northern regions and the capital. This multifaceted role highlighted the division's pivotal contribution to the security infrastructure of Afghanistan, ensuring vital connections remained open and safeguarded amidst the nation's complex geopolitical landscape.

The 80th military division in Baghlan was then promoted to 6th Army Corp and included the 80th division of Baghlan, 20th division of Samangan Province and 54th division of Kunduz in north eastern of Afghanistan.

== Role in overthrown of Dr. Najibullah ==
In the aftermath of the Soviet Union's withdrawal from Afghanistan, Sayed Mansur Naderi, a distinguished leader within the Ismaili community, played a pivotal role alongside his son, Sayed Jafar Naderi, in shaping the political landscape of the country. The Naderis were instrumental in orchestrating a strategic mutiny against President Najibullah's regime, significantly contributing to its eventual downfall by disrupting the government's main supply route from the former Soviet Union. This action marked a turning point in Afghanistan's history, facilitating a shift in power dynamics away from the traditional Pashtun dominance.

Following this period of upheaval, Sayed Mansur Naderi emerged as a founding figure of the National Islamic Movement (NIM), which sought to represent and advocate for the rights of ethnic minorities within Afghanistan. The movement's push for a federal system aimed to ensure a more inclusive approach to governance, reflecting the country's diverse ethnic composition. Through his leadership and vision, Sayed Mansur Naderi significantly contributed to efforts to establish a more equitable and representative political order in Afghanistan, emphasizing the critical importance of inclusivity, minority rights, and federalism in the nation's quest for peace and stability.

== Mujahideen era ==
During the Mujahideen era in Afghanistan, Sayed Mansur Naderi held the position of vice president under the presidency of Burhanuddin Rabbani. Throughout this period, Naderi, alongside the Ismaili community, exerted influence in several northern provinces of Afghanistan, including Baghlan, Badakhshan, Samangan, Kunduz, and Balkh. His role extended beyond administrative duties; he actively participated in peace negotiations between various Mujahideen factions. The region of Kayan, where Naderi was based, gained a reputation as a center for peace and negotiations, reflecting his efforts to broker peace among conflicting groups during a tumultuous time in Afghanistan's history.

== Taliban era (1996-2001) ==
During the 1990s Taliban period, Sayed Mansoor Naderi and his son Sayed Jafar Naderi fought against Taliban until August 1998. When, Taliban took over Northern Afghanistan including Kayan in 1998, the Ismaili forces were defeated and Mansoor apparently took refuge in Uzbekistan. He returned from Uzbekistan to Afghanistan after the fall of the Taliban, in 2002.

== Democracy era (2001-2021) ==
The Ismaili community, under the leadership of the Imam of the Ismaili Muslims, Prince Karim Aga Khan, has been instrumental in the development and reconstruction efforts in Afghanistan from 2001 to 2021, a period marked by significant political transitions culminating in the fall of the Republic Government of Afghanistan. The Aga Khan Development Network (AKDN) has been a major contributor to these efforts, allocating over $1 billion towards the rehabilitation of the country post-Taliban era (1996-2001). This financial commitment underscores the network's dedication to fostering sustainable development in Afghanistan.

Sayed Mansur Naderi, serving as a prominent Ismaili leader within Afghanistan, has been pivotal in navigating the complex political landscape of the country. His establishment of the National Solidarity Party of Afghanistan and his efforts to integrate Ismailis into the political framework significantly influenced the community's representation in government. Ismailis have held various key positions, including seats in the Afghan parliament and roles within the executive branch, such as the State Ministry for Peace and the Ministry of Urban Development and Housing. Additionally, Ismailis have served as Senior Advisors to former President Ashraf Ghani, highlighting their active involvement in governance and peace-building initiatives.

In the political landscape of Afghanistan, the National Solidarity Party of Afghanistan, led by Sayed Mansur Naderi, and the Ismaili community have played active roles in Afghanistan's electoral processes. During the 2009 presidential elections, they supported Hamid Karzai, organizing election rallies in the northern regions of Afghanistan as well as in the capital, Kabul. In the subsequent 2014 presidential elections, the Ismailis in Afghanistan lent their support to Ashraf Ghani. In the 2019 elections, Sayed Mansur Naderi and his political party expressed their support for Abdullah Abdullah. This involvement reflects the political engagement and support patterns of the Ismaili community and the National Solidarity Party of Afghanistan across different electoral cycles in the country.

== Contribution to Islamic Culture ==
Sayed Mansur Naderi, recognized for his leadership within the religious community of Afghanistan, has notably contributed to the enrichment of Islamic culture. His contributions include the significant role of patron in the creation of the World's Largest Handmade Quran in Afghanistan. This project, which was undertaken by a team of scholars over a period of five years, resulted in a manuscript that is currently housed in the Hakim Naser Khusraw Balkhi Cultural Center in Kabul, Afghanistan. The manuscript was completed and unveiled in 2012. This initiative reflects Sayed Mansur Naderi's dedication to cultural preservation within the Islamic tradition. The creation of the handwritten Quran represents a significant cultural achievement, underscoring the importance of scholarship and the arts within the Islamic community. It serves as an example of the enduring legacy of Islamic culture and its contribution to global heritage, emphasizing the commitment to the preservation and celebration of Islamic scholarly and artistic traditions.

== See also ==
- Sayed Jafar Naderi
- Sadat Mansoor Naderi
- Farkhunda Zahra Naderi
- Sayed Kayan
- Rawnaq Naderi
- National Unity Party of Afghanistan
- Baghlan Province
- Puli Khumri
- Kayan Valley
