= Kayan, Baghlan =

Kayan
- Motto: The Cradle of Afghanistan Ismailis
- Location in Afghanistan
- Coordinates: 35°38′4″N 68°25′42″E
- Country: Afghanistan
- Province: Baghlan Province

Government
  - Afghanistan Ismaili Leader: Sayed Mansur Naderi
  - Governor: Sayed Jafar Naderi

Population
  - Ethnicities: Sayyids Hazara
  - Religions: Twelver and Ismaili Shia Islam
- Time zone: + 4.30
- Website: https://www.sayedkayan.org

Kayan is a village in Baghlan Province in north eastern Afghanistan. It is located in the valley of Kayan, some 30 kilometres west of Dushi. The residents of Kayan valley are mostly members of Sadat and Hazara tribes loyal to Sayed Kayan who was the official representative of Aga Khan in Afghanistan. The Sayyids follow Isma'ili Islam.

== See also ==
- Baghlan Province
