= Sayed Kayan =

Afghan Nizari Ismaili leader and writer

Sayed Nadir Shah Kayani
- سید نادرشاه کیانی
- Portrait of Sayed Nadir Shah Kayani

Personal life
- Born: 1897 Kulob, Emirate of Bukhara
- Died: February 24, 1971 (aged 73–74) Kabul, Afghanistan
- Resting place: Kayan Valley, Baghlan Province, Afghanistan

Religious life
- Religion: Nizari Ismailism

Sayed Nadir Shah Kayani (Persian: سید نادرشاه کیانی; 1897 – 24 February 1971), often called Sayed Kayan, was an Afghan Nizari Ismaili community leader and Persian-language writer. The Library of Congress describes him as a leader of the Ismaili community in Afghanistan and a member of a family of Ismaili leaders based in Kayan Valley. He wrote poetry and works on philosophical and religious subjects.

== Early life ==
Kayani was born in 1897 in Kulob, which was then part of the Emirate of Bukhara. He later became associated with the leadership of the Ismaili community in northern Afghanistan.

== Community leadership ==
Kayani assumed a leadership role after the death of his relative Sayed Timur. Faruk Mergen, summarizing accounts by Hafizullah Emadi, writes that the succession was disputed between Kayani and Timur's son Shuja. During the political conflict of 1929, Shuja supported Habibullāh Kalakāni, while Kayani supported Mohammed Nadir Khan. Kayani's position was strengthened after Mohammed Nadir Khan took power. Mergen also states that the Kayani family subsequently acted as an intermediary between Aga Khan III and Ismailis in Afghanistan.

A biography published by the Sayed Kayan Association states that Aga Khan III appointed Kayani as a da‘i in 1926 and granted him the title da‘i al-du‘at in 1937.

== Writings ==
The Library of Congress holds a Persian manuscript of Kayani's Gulshan-i rāz: sālis. Its catalogue describes the work as a text on Nizari Ismaili belief arranged in fourteen sections on philosophical and religious subjects.

Masoud Mirshahi writes that Kayani produced more than fifty works of poetry, history and religious writing. One of them, Tarikh-i Gharib, is an autobiographical account of unrest in Afghanistan from 1928 to 1930. Mirshahi describes the book as covering Ismailism, Kayani's life and his dealings with Afghan officials. An edition prepared by Mirshahi was published in London by Mehri Publishing in 2016.

== Death and succession ==
Kayani died in Kabul on 24 February 1971 and was buried in Kayan Valley. His elder son, Sayed Shah Nasir Naderi, succeeded him as head of the community in 1971. Kayan Valley states that in 1980, before moving to London, Nasir appointed his younger brother, Sayed Mansur Naderi, as his successor; Mergen dates the transfer of leadership to 1981. Mansur subsequently led the community. Kayan Valley also states that three of Mansur's brothers—Sayed Gohar Khan, Sayed Abdul Qadir and the poet Sayed Nuruddin Rawnaq Naderi—were killed while Mansur was imprisoned. An article in Hasht-e Subh reports that Rawnaq was killed by the Afghan intelligence agency AGSA at Pul-e-Charkhi prison in 1979.

== See also ==
- Kayan, Baghlan
- Nizari Ismailism
