= National Solidarity Party of Afghanistan =

National Solidarity Party of Afghanistan حزب پيوند ملی افغانستان
- Leader: Sayed Mansur Naderi
- Secretary: Zohoor Razmjo
- Headquarters: Kabul
- Ideology: Ismaili Shia interests
- Political position: Centre

The National Solidarity Party of Afghanistan or some other places written as National Unity Party of Afghanistan (Dari: حزب پيوند ملی افغانستان Hezb-e-Paiwand Mili Afghanistan, Paiwand Milli, Paiwand Mili) is a political party representing the Afghanistan's Ismaili Shia minority, largely found in Kabul Province, Baghlan Province, Bamyan Province, Balkh Province and Badakhshan province. As recently as 2020 it was one of 84 political parties registered with the Afghan Ministry of Justice, and headed by Sayed Mansur Naderi (or "Nadiri").

Estimates of congressmen in the Wolesi Jirga affiliated with the Paiwand-e-milli range from 2 in 2005, 4 in 2010 which included Sayed Mansur Naderi, Farkhunda Zahra Naderi, Sayed Dawood Naderi, Ramazan Juma Zada and 3 in 2018.

In the 2004 presidential election, the party supported Hamid Karzai. During the 2009 presidential election in Afghanistan, the party again supported Hamid Karzai.

National Solidarity Party of Afghanistan endorsed Ashraf Ghani Ahmadzai in the 2014 presidential election which led to Ashraf Ghani Ahmadzai's success.

And in the 2019 presidential election in Afghanistan, the National Unity Party of Afghanistan endorsed Dr. Abdullah Abdullah.

The National Solidarity Party of Afghanistan had introduced Sadat Mansoor Naderi as the nominee for the ministry of Urban Development during Ashraf Ghani regime, who served on this post until 2021's fall of Kabul to Taliban.

== See also ==
- List of Islamic political parties
