= State Ministry for Peace =

Afghan government ministry responsible for peace process

Agency overview
- Formed: 2019
- Dissolved: 26 December 2021
- Type: Peace process
- Jurisdiction: Afghanistan
- Headquarters: Kabul
- Minister responsible: Sadat Mansoor Naderi
- Deputy Ministers responsible: Abdullah Khenjani, Policy and Communications; Dr. Alema, Women Affairs and Human Rights
- Agency executives: Khushnood Nabizada, Chief of Staff; Maryam Rayed, Deputy Director of Human Rights
- Website: smp.gov.af/en

The State Ministry for Peace Affairs, officially known as State Ministry for Peace (SMP) was an Afghan government ministry responsible for peace process focused on to end ongoing wars in Afghanistan diplomatically. Founded in July 2019 by the government of Afghanistan, it advocated peace negotiations and future political stability in the country. SMP ministry was tasked with various drivers such as monitoring Afghanistan conflict and carrying negotiations with those individuals, groups and organisations involving Afghan war and Taliban insurgency in particular.

It also worked with United Nations, United States Agency for International Development, and World Bank for economic development in the country. It is engaged in community development programmes through various platforms such as Community Development Councils and citizen charter program to achieve pre-determined goals focused on economic, community and peace development.

Following the fall of Kabul and the reinstatement of the Islamic Emirate of Afghanistan, the Ministry was disbanded on 26 December 2021.

== History ==
Prior to SMP, the peace process was tasked to Afghan High Peace Council that worked for over ten years from 2010 until it was dissolved in 2019 following SMP's formation.

State Ministry for Peace was heavily engaged into the administration and coordination of the processes between the Doha negotiating team, President Ashraf Ghani's office and Dr. Abdullah Abdullah's office at the High Council for National Reconciliation. Taliban was constantly launching incidents to interrupt peace process, including, targeting to assassinate Khushnood Nabizada, Chief of Staff to SMP on 1 February 2021 in Kabul, while he was on his way from home to the office.

Consisting of 21 members of negotiating team within the ministry, including five women, it represented Afghan government diplomatically while opponents members represents Taliban under peace deal signed by the US and Taliban.

Following the fall of Kabul to the Taliban, the Ministry was disbanded by the new Islamic Emirate of Afghanistan on 26 December 2021.

== Doha Peace Negotiating Members ==
Twenty two individuals including political figures, human rights activists, women representatives, civil society members and tribal elders were introduced by both Afghan president Ashraf Ghani and the head of High Council for National Reconciliation Dr. Abdullah Abdullah to represent the government of Afghanistan during the Afghan intra talks with the Taliban in Doha, Qatar. State Ministry Peace's role was to handle the secretariat and management of the process with the Minister being in the team both as the secretary and also as a member.

#	Name	Role	Alliance	Reference(s)
1	Sadat Mansoor Naderi	State Minister for Peace and Member	National Solidarity Party of Afghanistan	
2	Mohammed Masoom Stanekzai	Chief Peace Negotiator	Ashraf Ghani	
3	Fatima Gailani	Member	National Islamic Front of Afghanistan	
4	Ahmed Gailani	Deputy chairperson	National Islamic Front of Afghanistan	
5	Fawzia Koofi	Member	Dr. Abdullah Abdullah	
6	Nader Nadery	Member	Ashraf Ghani	
7	Matin Beg	Member	Ashraf Ghani	
8	Habiba Sarābi	Member	Dr. Abdullah Abdullah	
9	Ghairat Baheer	Member	Hezb-e Islami Gulbuddin	
10	Enayatullah Balegh	Member	Dr. Abdullah Abdullah	
11	Kalimullah Naqibi	Member	Dr. Abdullah Abdullah	
12	Mohammad Natiqi	Member	People's Islamic Unity Party of Afghanistan	
13	Ayoub Ansari	Member	Ashraf Ghani	
14	Sharifa Zurmati	Member	Ashraf Ghani	
15	Khalid Noor	Member	Jamiat-e Islami	
16	Batoor Dostum	Member	National Islamic Movement of Afghanistan	
17	Mohammad Amin Ahmadi	Member	Dr. Abdullah Abdullah	
18	Mohammad Rasool Talib	Member	Hezbe Wahdat	
19	Zarar Ahmad Osmani	Member	Dr. Abdullah Abdullah	
20	Ghulam Farooq Majroh	Member	Dr. Abdullah Abdullah	
21	Abdul Hafiz Mansoor	Member	Jamiat-e Islami	
22	Ataullah Lodin	Member	Dr. Abdullah Abdullah	
