= Sadat, Iran =

Sadat (Persian: سادات) may refer to:

- Sadat, Gilan
- Sadat, Ilam
- Sadat, Isfahan
- Sadat, Abadan, Khuzestan Province
- Sadat, Ahvaz, Khuzestan Province
- Sadat-e Mohammad Ebrahim, Izeh County, Khuzestan Province
- Sadat-e Nejat (disambiguation)
- Sadat, Khorramshahr, Khuzestan Province
- Sadat-e Hayat Gheyb, Masjed Soleyman County, Khuzestan Province
- Sadat-e Bakhat Najat, Shush County, Khuzestan Province
- Sadat Fazel-e Do, Shush County, Khuzestan Province
- Sadat Fazel-e Seh, Shush County, Khuzestan Province
- Sadat, Kohgiluyeh and Boyer-Ahmad
- Sadat, Boyer-Ahmad, Kohgiluyeh and Boyer-Ahmad Province
- Sadat, Razavi Khorasan
- Sadat Rural District, in Lali County, Khuzestan Province
