= Dahimi-ye Do, Karkheh =

Village in Khuzestan province, Iran

Dahimi-ye Do Persian: دهيمي دو
- Village
- Location within Iran
- Coordinates: 31°51′01″N 48°31′26″E
- Country: Iran
- Province: Khuzestan
- County: Karkheh
- District: Central
- Rural District: Ahudasht

Population (2016)
  - Total: 1,433
- Time zone: UTC+3:30 (IRST)

Dahimi-ye Do (Persian: دهيمي دو) (Note: Also romanized as Daḩīmī-ye Do; also known as Dahīmeh-ye Do) is a village in Ahudasht Rural District of the Central District of Karkheh County, Khuzestan province, Iran.

== Demographics ==
=== Population ===
At the time of the 2006 National Census, the village's population was 1,154 in 148 households, when it was in Shavur District of Shush County. The following census in 2011 counted 1,405 people in 309 households. The 2016 census measured the population of the village as 1,433 people in 338 households. It was the most populous village in its rural district.

In 2019, the district was separated from the county in the establishment of Karkheh County, and the rural district was transferred to the new Central District.
