= Zabideh =

Zabideh or Zobeideh or Zobeydeh (Persian: زبيده) may refer to:

- Zobeydeh, Kerman
- Zobeydeh, Khuzestan
- Zobeydeh-ye Ariyez, Khuzestan Province
- Zobeydeh Dubat, Khuzestan Province
- Zabideh, South Khorasan
