= Shavur =

Shavur (Persian: شاوور) may refer to:

- Rashg-e Shavur
- Sadd-e Shavur
- Shavur, Iran, a city in Karkheh County, Khuzestan province
- Shavur District
- Shavur Rural District
