= Khasheh =

Khasheh خشه
- Village
- Location within Iran
- Coordinates: 31°47′16″N 48°26′02″E
- Country: Iran
- Province: Khuzestan
- County: Shush
- Bakhsh: Shavur
- Rural District: Seyyed Abbas

Population (2006)
  - Total: 467
- Time zone: UTC+3:30 (IRST)
  - Summer (DST): UTC+4:30 (IRDT)

Khasheh (Persian: خشه, also Romanized as Khasheh; also known as Khasheh-ye Salmān Sardār and Salmān Sardār) is a village in Seyyed Abbas Rural District, Shavur District, Shush County, Khuzestan Province, Iran. At the 2006 census, its population was 467, in 89 families.
