= Goriz-e Karidi =

Goriz-e Karidi گريزكريدي
- Village
- Location within Iran
- Coordinates: 32°02′00″N 48°09′00″E
- Country: Iran
- Province: Khuzestan
- County: Shush
- Bakhsh: Shavur
- Rural District: Seyyed Abbas

Population (2006)
  - Total: 293
- Time zone: UTC+3:30 (IRST)
  - Summer (DST): UTC+4:30 (IRDT)

Goriz-e Karidi (Persian: گريزكريدي, also Romanized as Gorīz-e Karīdī) is a village in Seyyed Abbas Rural District, Shavur District, Shush County, Khuzestan Province, Iran. At the 2006 census, its population was 293, in 39 families.
