= Mohammad Shoqati =

Mohammad Shoqati محمدشقاطي
- Village
- Country: Iran
- Province: Khuzestan
- County: Shush
- Bakhsh: Fath Olmobin
- Rural District: Sorkheh

Population (2006)
  - Total: 1,250
- Time zone: UTC+3:30 (IRST)
  - Summer (DST): UTC+4:30 (IRDT)

Mohammad Shoqati (Persian: محمدشقاطي, also Romanized as Moḩammad Shoqāṭī) is a village in Sorkheh Rural District, Fath Olmobin District, Shush County, Khuzestan Province, Iran. At the 2006 census, its population was 1,250, in 195 families.
