= Hoveysh-e Jadid =

Hoveysh-e Jadid حويش جديد
- Village
- Interactive map of Hoveysh-e Jadid
- Country: Iran
- Province: Khuzestan
- County: Shush
- Bakhsh: Shavur
- Rural District: Seyyed Abbas

Population (2006)
  - Total: 240
- Time zone: UTC+3:30 (IRST)
  - Summer (DST): UTC+4:30 (IRDT)

Hoveysh-e Jadid (Persian: حويش جديد, also Romanized as Ḩoveysh-e Jadīd) is a village in Seyyed Abbas Rural District, Shavur District, Shush County, Khuzestan Province, Iran. At the 2006 census, its population was 240, in 39 families.
