= Salman Davud =

Salman Davud سلمان داود
- Village
- Location within Iran
- Coordinates: 31°53′23″N 48°25′42″E
- Country: Iran
- Province: Khuzestan
- County: Shush
- Bakhsh: Shavur
- Rural District: Ahudasht

Population (2006)
  - Total: 690
- Time zone: UTC+3:30 (IRST)
  - Summer (DST): UTC+4:30 (IRDT)

Salman Davud (Persian: سلمان داود, also Romanized as Salmān Dāvūd) is a village in Ahudasht Rural District, Shavur District, Shush County, Khuzestan Province, Iran. At the 2006 census, its population was 690, in 102 families.
