= Saleh Mashhud =

Saleh Mashhud صالح مشهود
- Village
- Location within Iran
- Coordinates: 32°01′00″N 48°19′00″E
- Country: Iran
- Province: Khuzestan
- County: Shush
- Bakhsh: Shavur
- Rural District: Shavur

Population (2006)
  - Total: 287
- Time zone: UTC+3:30 (IRST)
  - Summer (DST): UTC+4:30 (IRDT)

Saleh Mashhud (Persian: صالح مشهود, also Romanized as Şāleḩ Mashhūd; also known as Şāleḩ Mashhadad is a village in Shavur Rural District, Shavur District, Shush County, Khuzestan Province, Iran. At the 2006 census, its population was 287, in 41 families.
