= Abitar =

Abitar ابيتر
- village
- Interactive map of Abitar
- Coordinates: 31.93086°N 48.26781°E
- Country: Iran
- Province: Khuzestan
- County: Shush
- Bakhsh: Shavur
- Rural District: Seyyed Abbas

Population (2006)
  - Total: 1,325
- Time zone: UTC+3:30 (IRST)
  - Summer (DST): UTC+4:30 (IRDT)

Abitar (Persian: ابيتر, also Romanized as Ābītar) is a village in Seyyed Abbas, Shavur District, Shush County, Khuzestan Province, Iran. At the 2006 census, its population was 1,325, in 182 families.
