= Seyyed Rahimeh =

Village in Khuzestan province, Iran

Seyyed Rahimeh Persian: سيدرحيمه
- Village
- Location within Iran
- Coordinates: 31°58′25″N 48°26′12″E
- Country: Iran
- Province: Khuzestan
- County: Karkheh
- District: Shavur
- Rural District: Shavur

Population (2016)
  - Total: 1,138
- Time zone: UTC+3:30 (IRST)

Seyyed Rahimeh (Persian: سيدرحيمه) (Note: Also romanized as Seyyed Raḩīmeh; also known as Seyyed Raḩmān) is a village in, and the capital of, Shavur Rural District of Shavur District, Karkheh County, Khuzestan province, Iran. The previous capital of the rural district was the village of Rashk-e Shavur, now the city of Shavur.

== Demographics ==
=== Population ===
At the time of the 2006 National Census, the village's population was 616 in 109 households, when it was in Shush County. The following census in 2011 counted 1,169 people in 300 households. The 2016 census measured the population of the village as 1,138 people in 318 households.

In 2019, the district was separated from the county in the establishment of Karkheh County.
