= Sadat Fazel =

Sadat Fazel (Persian: ساداتفاضل) may refer to:

- Sadat Fazel 1
- Sadat Fazel 2
- Sadat Fazel 3
