= Mashi, Iran =

Mashi (Persian: ماشي), in Iran, may refer to:

- Mashi, Kerman
- Mashi, Khuzestan
- Mashi, Sistan and Baluchestan
