= Sheykh Zoveyr =

Sheykh Zoveyr شيخ زوير
- Village
- Location within Iran
- Coordinates: 31°50′30″N 48°20′13″E
- Country: Iran
- Province: Khuzestan
- County: Shush
- Bakhsh: Shavur
- Rural District: Seyyed Abbas

Population (2006)
  - Total: 272
- Time zone: UTC+3:30 (IRST)
  - Summer (DST): UTC+4:30 (IRDT)

Sheykh Zoveyr (Persian: شيخ زوير; also known as Sheykh ‘Abdollāh and Sheykh Zeybak) is a village in Seyyed Abbas Rural District, Shavur District, Shush County, Khuzestan Province, Iran. At the 2006 census, its population was 272, in 38 families.
