= Sheykh Zeydan =

Sheykh Zeydan شيخ زيدان
- Village
- Location within Iran
- Coordinates: 31°46′55″N 48°29′17″E
- Country: Iran
- Province: Khuzestan
- County: Shush
- Bakhsh: Shavur
- Rural District: Seyyed Abbas

Population (2006)
  - Total: 564
- Time zone: UTC+3:30 (IRST)
  - Summer (DST): UTC+4:30 (IRDT)

Sheykh Zeydan (Persian: شيخ زيدان, also Romanized as Sheykh Zeydān; also known as Beyt-e Zeyvān) is a village in Seyyed Abbas Rural District, Shavur District, Shush County, Khuzestan Province, Iran. At the 2006 census, its population was 564, in 93 families.
