= Habaiyeh =

Habaiyeh حبائيه
- Village
- Location within Iran
- Coordinates: 31°53′55″N 48°17′57″E
- Country: Iran
- Province: Khuzestan
- County: Shush
- Bakhsh: Shavur
- Rural District: Seyyed Abbas

Population (2006)
  - Total: 991
- Time zone: UTC+3:30 (IRST)
  - Summer (DST): UTC+4:30 (IRDT)

Habaiyeh (Persian: حبائيه, also Romanized as Ḩabā'īyeh; also known as Ḩabā'īyeh-ye Sādāt) is a village in Seyyed Abbas Rural District, Shavur District, Shush County, Khuzestan Province, Iran. At the 2006 census, its population was 991, in 133 families.
