= Hoseyn Ghalayem =

Hoseyn Ghalayem حسين غليم
- Village
- Location within Iran
- Coordinates: 31°53′48″N 48°23′39″E
- Country: Iran
- Province: Khuzestan
- County: Shush
- Bakhsh: Shavur
- Rural District: Seyyed Abbas

Population (2006)
  - Total: 657
- Time zone: UTC+3:30 (IRST)
  - Summer (DST): UTC+4:30 (IRDT)

Hoseyn Ghalayem (Persian: حسين غليم, also Romanized as Ḩoseyn Ghalayem; also known as Beyt-e Alvān) is a village in Seyyed Abbas Rural District, Shavur District, Shush County, Khuzestan Province, Iran. At the 2006 census, its population was 657, in 104 families.
