= Shahrak-e Qods =

Shahrak-e Qods (Persian: شهرك قدس) may refer to:

- Shahrak-e Qods, Ilam, a village
- Shahrak-e Qods, Dezful, a village in Dezful County, Khuzestan Province
- Shahrak-e Qods, Mahshahr, a village in Mahshahr County, Khuzestan Province
- Shahrak-e Qods, Shush, a village in Shush County, Khuzestan Province
- Shahrak-e Qods, Sistan and Baluchestan, a village in Bampur County, Sistan and Baluchestan Province
- Shahrak-e Qods (Tehran), a neighborhood

== See also ==
- Qods (disambiguation)
