= Goteysh =

Goteysh گطيش
- Village
- Location within Iran
- Coordinates: 31°57′19″N 48°33′36″E
- Country: Iran
- Province: Khuzestan
- County: Shush
- Bakhsh: Shavur
- Rural District: Ahudasht

Population (2006)
  - Total: 230
- Time zone: UTC+3:30 (IRST)
  - Summer (DST): UTC+4:30 (IRDT)

Goteysh (Persian: گطيش, also Romanized as Goţeysh, Gatīsh, and Gotīsh; also known as Ḩarmaleh, Komeyt, Kumait, Qowmāt, and Qūmāt) is a village in Ahudasht Rural District, Shavur District, Shush County, Khuzestan Province, Iran. At the 2006 census, its population was 230, in 32 families.
