= Khovis =

Village in Khuzestan province, Iran

Khovis Persian: خويس
- Village
- Location within Iran
- Coordinates: 32°01′43″N 48°16′29″E
- Country: Iran
- Province: Khuzestan
- County: Karkheh
- District: Shavur
- Rural District: Karkha

Population (2016)
  - Total: 3,520
- Time zone: UTC+3:30 (IRST)

Khovis (Persian: خويس) (Note: Also romanized as Khaveys, Khoveyyes, and Khovīs; also known as Khūveys and Meysām-e Tammār) is a village in, and the capital of, Karkha Rural District of Shavur District, Karkheh County, Khuzestan province, Iran.

== Demographics ==
=== Population ===
At the time of the 2006 National Census, the village's population was 3,451 in 459 households, when it was in Shavur Rural District of Shush County. The following census in 2011 counted 4,067 people in 946 households. The 2016 census measured the population of the village as 3,520 people in 989 households. It was the most populous village in its rural district.

In 2019, the district was separated from the county in the establishment of Karkheh County, and Khovis was transferred to Karkha Rural District created in the district.
