= Abu ol Qiyefeh =

Abu ol Qiyefeh ابوالقيفه
- Village
- Country: Iran
- Province: Khuzestan
- County: Shush
- Bakhsh: Shavur
- Rural District: Shavur

Population (2006)
  - Total: 235
- Time zone: UTC+3:30 (IRST)
  - Summer (DST): UTC+4:30 (IRDT)

Abu ol Qiyefeh (Persian: ابوالقيفه, also Romanized as Abū ol Qīyefeh) is a village in Shavur Rural District, Shavur District, Shush County, Khuzestan Province, Iran. At the 2006 census, its population was 235, in 43 families.
