= Seyyed Khashan =

Seyyed Khashan سيدخشان
- Village
- Location within Iran
- Coordinates: 31°58′24″N 48°26′10″E
- Country: Iran
- Province: Khuzestan
- County: Shush
- Bakhsh: Shavur
- Rural District: Ahudasht

Population (2006)
  - Total: 1,243
- Time zone: UTC+3:30 (IRST)
  - Summer (DST): UTC+4:30 (IRDT)

Seyyed Khashan (Persian: سيدخشان, also Romanized as Seyyed Khashān) is a village in Ahudasht Rural District, Shavur District, Shush County, Khuzestan Province, Iran. At the 2006 census, its population was 1,243, in 203 families.
