= Kazem Hamd =

Kazem Hamd كاظم حمد
- Village
- Location within Iran
- Coordinates: 31°48′48″N 48°22′42″E
- Country: Iran
- Province: Khuzestan
- County: Shush
- Bakhsh: Shavur
- Rural District: Seyyed Abbas

Population (2006)
  - Total: 716
- Time zone: UTC+3:30 (IRST)
  - Summer (DST): UTC+4:30 (IRDT)

Kazem Hamd (Persian: كاظم حمد, also Romanized as Kāz̧em Ḩamd; also known as Kāz̧em Aḩmad, Kāz̧em Aḩmad-e Laţīfī, and Kāzim Ahmad) is a village in Seyyed Abbas Rural District, Shavur District, Shush County, Khuzestan Province, Iran. At the 2006 census, its population was 716, in 111 families.
