= Hasan Heydar =

Hasan Heydar حسن حيدر
- Village
- Country: Iran
- Province: Khuzestan
- County: Shush
- Bakhsh: Shavur
- Rural District: Ahudasht

Population (2006)
  - Total: 179
- Time zone: UTC+3:30 (IRST)
  - Summer (DST): UTC+4:30 (IRDT)

Hasan Heydar (Persian: حسن حيدر, also Romanized as Ḩasan Ḩeydar) is a village in Ahudasht Rural District, Shavur District, Shush County, Khuzestan Province, Iran. At the 2006 census, its population was 179, in 33 families.
