= Aljazayer =

Aljazayer الجزاير
- Village
- Location within Iran
- Coordinates: 32°00′05″N 48°17′22″E
- Country: Iran
- Province: Khuzestan
- County: Shush
- Bakhsh: Shavur
- Rural District: Seyyed Abbas

Population (2006)
  - Total: 1,696
- Time zone: UTC+3:30 (IRST)
  - Summer (DST): UTC+4:30 (IRDT)

Aljazayer (Persian: الجزاير, also Romanized as Aljazāyer and Al Jazāyer; also known as ‘Abd or Raḩīm-e Ẕomdī) is a village in Seyyed Abbas Rural District, Shavur District, Shush County, Khuzestan Province, Iran. At the 2006 census, its population was 1,696, in 232 families.
