= Malek-e Ashtar (disambiguation) =

Malek-e Ashtar is a village in Hamadan Province, Iran.

Malek-e Ashtar (Persian: مالك اشتر) may refer to:

- Malek-e Ashtar, Bagh-e Malek, Khuzestan Province
- Malek-e Ashtar, Shush, Khuzestan Province
- Malek-e Ashtar, Kohgiluyeh and Boyer-Ahmad
