= Qasem Motsar =

Qasem Motsar قاسم مطشر
- Village
- Location within Iran
- Coordinates: 32°15′00″N 48°09′00″E
- Country: Iran
- Province: Khuzestan
- County: Shush
- Bakhsh: Fath Olmobin
- Rural District: Sorkheh

Population (2006)
  - Total: 462
- Time zone: UTC+3:30 (IRST)
  - Summer (DST): UTC+4:30 (IRDT)

Qasem Motsar (Persian: قاسم مطشر, also Romanized as Qāsem Moţs̄ar) is a village in Sorkheh Rural District, Fath Olmobin District, Shush County, Khuzestan Province, Iran. At the 2006 census, its population was 462, in 62 families.
