= Maleheh =

Maleheh ملحه
- Village
- Location within Iran
- Coordinates: 32°17′20″N 48°09′03″E
- Country: Iran
- Province: Khuzestan
- County: Shush
- Bakhsh: Fath Olmobin
- Rural District: Sorkheh

Population (2006)
  - Total: 452
- Time zone: UTC+3:30 (IRST)
  - Summer (DST): UTC+4:30 (IRDT)

Maleheh (Persian: ملحه, also Romanized as Māleḩeh) is a village in Sorkheh Rural District, Fath Olmobin District, Shush County, Khuzestan Province, Iran. According to the 2006 census, its population was 452, in 61 families.
