= Saleh Said =

Saleh Said صالح سعيد
- Village
- Location within Iran
- Coordinates: 32°01′55″N 48°29′38″E
- Country: Iran
- Province: Khuzestan
- County: Shush
- Bakhsh: Shavur
- Rural District: Shavur

Population (2006)
  - Total: 73
- Time zone: UTC+3:30 (IRST)
  - Summer (DST): UTC+4:30 (IRDT)

Saleh Said (Persian: صالح سعيد, also Romanized as Şāleḩ Saʿīd; also known as Şāleḩ Seyyed and ‘Ammār) is a village in Shavur Rural District, Shavur District, Shush County, Khuzestan Province, Iran. At the 2006 census, its population was 73, in 12 families.
