= Tarvih Adai =

Tarvih Adai ترويح عداي
- Village
- Location within Iran
- Coordinates: 32°06′00″N 48°12′00″E
- Country: Iran
- Province: Khuzestan
- County: Shush
- Bakhsh: Fath Olmobin
- Rural District: Chenaneh

Population (2006)
  - Total: 537
- Time zone: UTC+3:30 (IRST)
  - Summer (DST): UTC+4:30 (IRDT)

Tarvih Adai (Persian: ترويح عداي, also Romanized as Tarvīḩ ‘Adāī) is a village in Chenaneh Rural District, Fath Olmobin District, Shush County, Khuzestan Province, Iran. At the 2006 census, its population was 537, in 75 families.
