= Kazem-e Heydar =

Kazem-e Heydar كاظم حيدر
- Village
- Location within Iran
- Coordinates: 31°53′14″N 48°36′15″E
- Country: Iran
- Province: Khuzestan
- County: Shush
- Bakhsh: Shavur
- Rural District: Ahudasht

Population (2006)
  - Total: 150
- Time zone: UTC+3:30 (IRST)
  - Summer (DST): UTC+4:30 (IRDT)

Kazem-e Heydar (Persian: كاظم حيدر, also Romanized as Kāz̧em-e Ḩeydar) is a village in Ahudasht Rural District, Shavur District, Shush County, Khuzestan Province, Iran. At the 2006 census, its population was 150, in 20 families.
