= Hoseyn Mashlush =

Hoseyn Mashlush حسين مشلوش
- Village
- Location within Iran
- Coordinates: 31°53′24″N 48°22′39″E
- Country: Iran
- Province: Khuzestan
- County: Shush
- Bakhsh: Shavur
- Rural District: Seyyed Abbas

Population (2006)
  - Total: 612
- Time zone: UTC+3:30 (IRST)
  - Summer (DST): UTC+4:30 (IRDT)

Hoseyn Mashlush (Persian: حسين مشلوش, also Romanized as Ḩoseyn Mashlūsh; also known as Ḩoseyn Mashkūsh) is a village in Seyyed Abbas Rural District, Shavur District, Shush County, Khuzestan Province, Iran. At the 2006 census, its population was 612, in 102 families.
