= Ghasha va Shiryul =

Ghasha va Shiryul غشاشيرويل
- Village
- Location within Iran
- Coordinates: 32°05′00″N 48°10′00″E
- Country: Iran
- Province: Khuzestan
- County: Shush
- Bakhsh: Fath Olmobin
- Rural District: Chenaneh

Population (2006)
  - Total: 469
- Time zone: UTC+3:30 (IRST)
  - Summer (DST): UTC+4:30 (IRDT)

Ghasha va Shiryul (Persian: غشاشيرويل, also Romanized as Ghashā va Shīryūl) is a village in Chenaneh Rural District, Fath Olmobin District, Shush County, Khuzestan Province, Iran. At the 2006 census, its population was 469, in 76 families. The Karkheh River flows to the east.
