= Sheykh Ghayib =

Sheykh Ghayib شيخ غايب
- Village
- Country: Iran
- Province: Khuzestan
- County: Shush
- Bakhsh: Shavur
- Rural District: Ahudasht

Population (2006)
  - Total: 193
- Time zone: UTC+3:30 (IRST)
  - Summer (DST): UTC+4:30 (IRDT)

'Sheykh Ghayib{ one of the elders of the Arab tribes of Bani Ka'b Karamullah(Arabic: شيخ غايب, also Romanized as Sheykh Ghāyīb) is a village in Ahudasht Rural District, Shavur District, Shush County, Khuzestan Province, Iran. At the 2006 census, its population was 193, in 26 families.
