= Ali Zogheyr =

Ali Zogheyr علي ضغير
- Village
- Location within Iran
- Coordinates: 31°56′11″N 48°27′11″E
- Country: Iran
- Province: Khuzestan
- County: Shush
- Bakhsh: Shavur
- Rural District: Ahudasht

Population (2006)
  - Total: 385
- Time zone: UTC+3:30 (IRST)
  - Summer (DST): UTC+4:30 (IRDT)

Ali Zogheyr (Persian: علي ضغير, also Romanized as ‘Alī Zogheyr) is a village in Ahudasht Rural District, Shavur District, Shush County, Khuzestan Province, Iran. At the 2006 census, its population was 385, in 49 families.
