= Sheykh Fares =

Sheykh Fares شيخ فارس
- Village
- Location within Iran
- Coordinates: 31°50′46″N 48°20′00″E
- Country: Iran
- Province: Khuzestan
- County: Shush
- Bakhsh: Shavur
- Rural District: Seyyed Abbas

Population (2006)
  - Total: 495
- Time zone: UTC+3:30 (IRST)
  - Summer (DST): UTC+4:30 (IRDT)

Sheykh Fares (Persian: شيخ فارس, also Romanized as Sheykh Fāres) is a village in Seyyed Abbas Rural District, Shavur District, Shush County, Khuzestan Province, Iran. At the 2006 census, its population was 495, in 70 families.
