= Shahrak-e Mojahedin =

Shahrak-e Mojahedin شهرك مجاهدين
- Village
- Location within Iran
- Coordinates: 31°56′34″N 48°12′08″E
- Country: Iran
- Province: Khuzestan
- County: Shush
- Bakhsh: Fath Olmobin
- Rural District: Chenaneh

Population (2006)
  - Total: 505
- Time zone: UTC+3:30 (IRST)
  - Summer (DST): UTC+4:30 (IRDT)

Shahrak-e Mojahedin (Persian: شهرك مجاهدين, also Romanized as Shahrak-e Mojāhedīn) is a village in Chenaneh Rural District, Fath Olmobin District, Shush County, Khuzestan Province, Iran. At the 2006 census, its population was 505, in 73 families.
