= Farahan Kabar =

Farahan Kabar, Iran فرحان كبر
- Village
- Location within Iran
- Coordinates: 32°01′58″N 48°01′21″E
- Country: Iran
- Province: Khuzestan
- County: Shush
- Bakhsh: Fath Olmobin
- Rural District: Chenaneh

Population (2006)
  - Total: 346
- Time zone: UTC+3:30 (IRST)
  - Summer (DST): UTC+4:30 (IRDT)

Farahan Kabar (Persian: فرحان كبر, also Romanized as Faraḩān Kabar) is a village in Chenaneh Rural District, Fath Olmobin District, Shush County, Khuzestan Province, Iran. At the 2006 census, its population was 346, in 42 families.
