= Sheykh Hatam =

Sheykh Hatam شيخ حاتم
- Village
- Location within Iran
- Coordinates: 31°51′16″N 48°21′13″E
- Country: Iran
- Province: Khuzestan
- County: Shush
- Bakhsh: Shavur
- Rural District: Seyyed Abbas

Population (2006)
  - Total: 599
- Time zone: UTC+3:30 (IRST)
  - Summer (DST): UTC+4:30 (IRDT)

Sheykh Hatam (Persian: شيخ حاتم, also Romanized as Sheykh Ḩātam; also known as Beyt-e Ḩātam-e Bozorg) is a village in Seyyed Abbas Rural District, Shavur District, Shush County, Khuzestan Province, Iran. As of the 2006 census, its population was 599, in 81 families.
