= Falij Dunar =

Falij Dunar فليج دونار
- Village
- Country: Iran
- Province: Khuzestan
- County: Shush
- Bakhsh: Fath Olmobin
- Rural District: Sorkheh

Population (2006)
  - Total: 380
- Time zone: UTC+3:30 (IRST)
  - Summer (DST): UTC+4:30 (IRDT)

Falij Dunar (Persian: فليج دونار, also Romanized as Falīj Dūnār) is a village in Sorkheh Rural District, Fath Olmobin District, Shush County, Khuzestan Province, Iran. At the 2006 census, its population was 380, in 60 families.
