= Abdol Khan-e Pain =

Village in Khuzestan province, Iran

Abdol Khan-e Pain Persian: عبدالخان پايين
- Village
- Location within Iran
- Coordinates: 31°49′43″N 48°23′20″E
- Country: Iran
- Province: Khuzestan
- County: Karkheh
- District: Central
- Rural District: Seyyed Abbas

Population (2016)
  - Total: 3,061
- Time zone: UTC+3:30 (IRST)

Abdol Khan-e Pain (Persian: عبدالخان پايين) (Note: Also romanized as ‘Abdol Khān-e Pā'īn; also known as ‘Abdol Khān, Abdollāh Khān-e-Pā’īn, and Seyyed Abbas) is a village in, and the capital of, Seyyed Abbas Rural District of the Central District of Karkheh County, Khuzestan province, Iran. It was the capital of Shavur District until its capital was transferred to the city of Shavur.

== Demographics ==
=== Population ===
At the time of the 2006 National Census, the village's population was 2,631 in 422 households, when it was in Shavur District of Shush County. The following census in 2011 counted 3,067 people in 715 households. The 2016 census measured the population of the village as 3,061 people in 795 households. It was the most populous village in its rural district.

In 2019, the district was separated from the county in the establishment of Karkheh County, and the rural district was transferred to the new Central District.
