= Khomeys =

Khomeys خميس
- Village
- Location within Iran
- Coordinates: 31°49′21″N 48°21′34″E
- Country: Iran
- Province: Khuzestan
- County: Shush
- Bakhsh: Shavur
- Rural District: Seyyed Abbas

Population (2006)
  - Total: 257
- Time zone: UTC+3:30 (IRST)
  - Summer (DST): UTC+4:30 (IRDT)

Khomeys (Persian: خميس; also known as Khomeys-e Sa‘d and Khomeys-e Sheykh Sa‘ad) is a village in Seyyed Abbas Rural District, Shavur District, Shush County, Khuzestan Province, Iran. At the 2006 census, its population was 257, in 40 families.
