= Mohammad Ghazban =

Mohammad Ghazban محمدغضبان
- Village
- Country: Iran
- Province: Khuzestan
- County: Shush
- Bakhsh: Shavur
- Rural District: Seyyed Abbas

Population (2006)
  - Total: 488
- Time zone: UTC+3:30 (IRST)
  - Summer (DST): UTC+4:30 (IRDT)

Mohammad Ghazban (Persian: محمدغضبان, also Romanized as Moḩammad Ghaz̤bān) is a village in Seyyed Abbas Rural District, Shavur District, Shush County, Khuzestan Province, Iran. At the 2006 census, its population was 488, in 90 families.
