= Mahareb =

Mahareb محارب
- Village
- Location within Iran
- Coordinates: 32°02′00″N 48°02′00″E
- Country: Iran
- Province: Khuzestan
- County: Shush
- Bakhsh: Fath Olmobin
- Rural District: Chenaneh

Population (2006)
  - Total: 253
- Time zone: UTC+3:30 (IRST)
  - Summer (DST): UTC+4:30 (IRDT)

Mahareb (Persian: محارب, also Romanized as Maḩāreb) is a village in Chenaneh Rural District, Fath Olmobin District, Shush County, Khuzestan Province, Iran. At the 2006 census, its population was 253, in 33 families.
