= Sadat (disambiguation) =

Sadat (Arabic: سادات) is a name given to descendants of the Islamic prophet, Muhammad.

Sadat may also refer to:

== Places ==
- Sadat City, a city in the Monufia Governorate, Egypt
- Sadat, Uttar Pradesh, a town and nagar panchayat in Ghazipur district, India
- Sadat Colony, a block in Gulberg town, Karachi, Pakistan
- Pak Sadat Colony, a neighbourhood in Korangi District, Karachi, Pakistan
- Sadat, Iran (disambiguation)

== Other uses ==
- Sadat, plural of Sayyid, a title of descendants of Muhammad
- Sadat (miniseries), a 1983 American biographical film about Anwar Sadat
- Sadat Academy for Management Sciences, a public academy in Maadi, Egypt
- Sadat Initiative, a 1977 visit to Israel by Anwar Sadat
- SADAT International Defense Consultancy, a Turkish security contractor
- Sadat Museum, a cultural museum in Alexandria, Egypt, dedicated to Anwar Sadat

== See also ==
- Saadat (disambiguation)
