= Seyyed Hamadi =

Seyyed Hamadi سيدحمادي
- Village
- Location within Iran
- Coordinates: 31°48′18″N 48°26′11″E
- Country: Iran
- Province: Khuzestan
- County: Shush
- Bakhsh: Shavur
- Rural District: Seyyed Abbas

Population (2006)
  - Total: 350
- Time zone: UTC+3:30 (IRST)
  - Summer (DST): UTC+4:30 (IRDT)

Seyyed Hamadi (Persian: سيدحمادي, also Romanized as Seyyed Ḩamādī) is a village in Seyyed Abbas Rural District, Shavur District, Shush County, Khuzestan Province, Iran. At the 2006 census, its population was 350, in 56 families.
