= Homeyla =

Homeyla حميلا
- Village
- Location within Iran
- Coordinates: 31°53′02″N 48°33′46″E
- Country: Iran
- Province: Khuzestan
- County: Shush
- Bakhsh: Shavur
- Rural District: Ahudasht

Population (2006)
  - Total: 550
- Time zone: UTC+3:30 (IRST)
  - Summer (DST): UTC+4:30 (IRDT)

Homeyla (Persian: حميلا, also Romanized as Ḩomeylā) is a village in Ahudasht Rural District, Shavur District, Shush County, Khuzestan Province, Iran. At the 2006 census, its population was 550, in 88 families.
