= Sandal, Iran =

Sandal سندال
- Village
- Location within Iran
- Coordinates: 32°08′00″N 48°03′00″E
- Country: Iran
- Province: Khuzestan
- County: Shush
- Bakhsh: Fath Olmobin
- Rural District: Chenaneh

Population (2006)
  - Total: 204
- Time zone: UTC+3:30 (IRST)
  - Summer (DST): UTC+4:30 (IRDT)

Sandal (Persian: سندال, also Romanized as Sandāl) is a village in Chenaneh Rural District, Fath Olmobin District, Shush County, Khuzestan Province, Iran. At the 2006 census, its population was 204, in 32 families.
