= Abid, Shush =

Abid عبيد
- Village
- Location within Iran
- Coordinates: 32°08′00″N 48°12′00″E
- Country: Iran
- Province: Khuzestan
- County: Shush
- Bakhsh: Fath Olmobin
- Rural District: Chenaneh

Population (2006)
  - Total: 527
- Time zone: UTC+3:30 (IRST)
  - Summer (DST): UTC+4:30 (IRDT)

Abid (Persian: عبيد, also Romanized as ‘Abīd) is a village in Chenaneh Rural District, Fath Olmobin District, Shush County, Khuzestan Province, Iran. At the 2006 census, its population was 527, in 80 families.
