= Sheykh Faleh =

Sheykh Faleh شيخ فالح
- Village
- Location within Iran
- Coordinates: 31°52′27″N 48°15′07″E
- Country: Iran
- Province: Khuzestan
- County: Shush
- Bakhsh: Shavur
- Rural District: Seyyed Abbas

Population (2006)
  - Total: 603
- Time zone: UTC+3:30 (IRST)
  - Summer (DST): UTC+4:30 (IRDT)

Sheykh Faleh (Persian: شيخ فالح, also Romanized as Sheykh Fāleḩ) is a village in Seyyed Abbas Rural District, Shavur District, Shush County, Khuzestan Province, Iran. At the 2006 census, its population was 603, in 97 families.
