= Seyyed Davud, Khuzestan =

Seyyed Davud سيدداود
- Village
- Location within Iran
- Coordinates: 31°55′36″N 48°29′03″E
- Country: Iran
- Province: Khuzestan
- County: Shush
- Bakhsh: Shavur
- Rural District: Ahudasht

Population (2006)
  - Total: 166
- Time zone: UTC+3:30 (IRST)
  - Summer (DST): UTC+4:30 (IRDT)

Seyyed Davud (Persian: سيدداود, also Romanized as Seyyed Dāvūd) is a village in Ahudasht Rural District, Shavur District, Shush County, Khuzestan Province, Iran. At the 2006 census, its population was 166, in 28 families.
