= San Karim =

San Karim سن كريم
- Village
- Location within Iran
- Coordinates: 31°55′06″N 48°16′58″E
- Country: Iran
- Province: Khuzestan
- County: Shush
- Bakhsh: Shavur
- Rural District: Seyyed Abbas

Population (2006)
  - Total: 279
- Time zone: UTC+3:30 (IRST)
  - Summer (DST): UTC+4:30 (IRDT)

San Karim (Persian: سن كريم, also Romanized as San Karīm; also known as San Karīm-e Bahādol) is a village in Seyyed Abbas Rural District, Shavur District, Shush County, Khuzestan Province, Iran. At the 2006 census, its population was 279, in 48 families.
