= Esteqlal =

Esteqlal استقلال
- Village
- Location within Iran
- Coordinates: 32°20′56″N 48°08′54″E
- Country: Iran
- Province: Khuzestan
- County: Shush
- Bakhsh: Shavur
- Rural District: Seyyed Abbas

Population (2006)
  - Total: 621
- Time zone: UTC+3:30 (IRST)
  - Summer (DST): UTC+4:30 (IRDT)

Esteqlal (Persian: استقلال, also Romanized as Esteqlāl) is a village in Seyyed Abbas Rural District, Shavur District, Shush County, Khuzestan Province, Iran. At the 2006 census, its population was 621, in 100 families.
