= Zobeyd va Dabbat =

Zobeyd va Dabbat زبيدودبات
- Village
- Location within Iran
- Coordinates: 31°45′58″N 48°38′53″E
- Country: Iran
- Province: Khuzestan
- County: Shush
- Bakhsh: Shavur
- Rural District: Ahudasht

Population (2006)
  - Total: 710
- Time zone: UTC+3:30 (IRST)
  - Summer (DST): UTC+4:30 (IRDT)

Zobeyd va Dabbat (Persian: زبيدودبات, also Romanized as Zobeyd va Dabbāt; also known as Zobeydeh Dūbāt) is a village in Ahudasht Rural District, Shavur District, Shush County, Khuzestan Province, Iran. At the 2006 census, its population was 710, in 110 families.
