= Mian Ab, Khuzestan =

Mian Ab ميان اب
- Village
- Location within Iran
- Coordinates: 31°58′20″N 48°26′46″E
- Country: Iran
- Province: Khuzestan
- County: Shush
- Bakhsh: Shavur
- Rural District: Ahudasht

Population (2006)
  - Total: 645
- Time zone: UTC+3:30 (IRST)
  - Summer (DST): UTC+4:30 (IRDT)
- Website: http://miyanab.com

Mian Ab (Persian: ميان اب, also Romanized as Mīān Āb and Miyānāb) is a village in Ahudasht Rural District, Shavur District, Shush County, Khuzestan Province, Iran. At the 2006 census, its population was 645, in 103 families.
