= Sheykh Ali, Khuzestan =

Village in Khuzestan province, Iran

Sheykh Ali Persian: شيخ علي
- Village
- Location within Iran
- Coordinates: 31°58′04″N 48°14′00″E
- Country: Iran
- Province: Khuzestan
- County: Shush
- District: Fath ol Mobin
- Rural District: Chenaneh

Population (2016)
  - Total: 673
- Time zone: UTC+3:30 (IRST)

Sheykh Ali (Persian: شيخ علي) (Note: Also romanized as Sheykh ʿAlī) is a village in Chenaneh Rural District of Fath ol Mobin District, Shush County, Khuzestan province, Iran.

== Demographics ==
=== Population ===
At the time of the 2006 National Census, the village's population was 630 in 79 households. The following census in 2011 counted 654 people in 149 households. The 2016 census measured the population of the village as 673 people in 170 households. It was the most populous village in its rural district.
