= Daham =

Daham دحام
- Village
- Country: Iran
- Province: Khuzestan
- County: Shush
- Bakhsh: Fath Olmobin
- Rural District: Chenaneh

Population (2006)
  - Total: 183
- Time zone: UTC+3:30 (IRST)
  - Summer (DST): UTC+4:30 (IRDT)

Daham (Persian: دحام, also Romanized as Daḥām) is a village in Chenaneh Rural District, Fath Olmobin District, Shush County, Khuzestan Province, Iran. At the 2006 census, its population was 183, in 30 families.
