= Seyyed Abdollah =

Seyyed Abdollah or Seyyedabdollah (Persian: سيدعبداله) may refer to:

- Seyyed Abdollah, Fars
- Seyyed Abdollah, Khuzestan
