= Shahur =

Shahur or Shahoor (Persian: شاهور) may refer to:

- Shahur, alternate name of Rashg-e Shavur
- Shahur, alternate name of Sadd-e Shavur
- Shahur or Shahoor, a village in Sarwakai Tehsil, South Waziristan, Pakistan
