= Seyyed Baqer, Khuzestan =

Seyyed Baqer سيدباقر
- Village
- Location within Iran
- Coordinates: 31°59′05″N 48°23′28″E
- Country: Iran
- Province: Khuzestan
- County: Shush
- Bakhsh: Shavur
- Rural District: Shavur

Population (2006)
  - Total: 735
- Time zone: UTC+3:30 (IRST)
  - Summer (DST): UTC+4:30 (IRDT)

Seyyed Baqer (Persian: سيدباقر, also Romanized as Seyyed Bāqer) is a village in Shavur Rural District, Shavur District, Shush County, Khuzestan Province, Iran. At the 2006 census, its population was 735, in 124 families.
