= Minab (disambiguation) =

Minab is a city in Hormozgan Province, Iran.

Minab (Persian: ميناب) may also refer to:

- Minab, Chaharmahal and Bakhtiari
- Minab, Sistan and Baluchestan
- Minab County, in Hormozgan Province

== See also ==
- Mosques and Imams National Advisory Board (MINAB)
- 2026 Minab school airstrike, during the 2026 Israeli–United States strikes on Iran
