= Alavi, Khuzestan =

Alavi عليوي
- Village
- Location within Iran
- Coordinates: 31°51′47″N 48°31′36″E
- Country: Iran
- Province: Khuzestan
- County: Shush
- Bakhsh: Shavur
- Rural District: Ahudasht

Population (2006)
  - Total: 334
- Time zone: UTC+3:30 (IRST)
  - Summer (DST): UTC+4:30 (IRDT)

Alavi (Persian: عليوي, also Romanized as ‘Alavī; also known as Al Hā’ī and Beyt-e Alhā’ī) is a village in Ahudasht Rural District, Shavur District, Shush County, Khuzestan Province, Iran. At the 2006 census, its population was 334, in 46 families.
