= Sheykh Jasem =

Sheykh Jasem شيخ جاسم
- Village
- Location within Iran
- Coordinates: 31°46′35″N 48°31′45″E
- Country: Iran
- Province: Khuzestan
- County: Shush
- Bakhsh: Shavur
- Rural District: Seyyed Abbas

Population (2006)
  - Total: 674
- Time zone: UTC+3:30 (IRST)
  - Summer (DST): UTC+4:30 (IRDT)

Sheykh Jasem (Persian: شيخ جاسم, also romanized as Sheykh Jāsem; also known as Beyt-e Jāsem, and Sādāt Fāz̧el-e Yek) is a village in Seyyed Abbas Rural District, Shavur District, Shush County, Khuzestan Province, Iran. At the 2006 census, its population was 674, in 108 families.
