= Juhi =

Juhi may refer to:

- Juhi (name), an Indian feminine name
- Juhi, Iran, a village in Khuzestan Province, Iran
- Juhi Mui, Indian television legal drama series
