= Saleh Davud =

Village in Khuzestan province, Iran

Saleh Davud Persian: صالح داود
- Village
- Location within Iran
- Coordinates: 32°21′10″N 48°08′20″E
- Country: Iran
- Province: Khuzestan
- County: Shush
- District: Fath ol Mobin
- Rural District: Sorkheh

Population (2016)
  - Total: 2,132
- Time zone: UTC+3:30 (IRST)

Saleh Davud (Persian: صالح داود) (Note: Also romanized as Şāleḥ Dāvūd and Şāleḥdāvūd) is a village in Sorkheh Rural District of Fath ol Mobin District, Shush County, Khuzestan province, Iran.

== Demographics ==
=== Population ===
At the time of the 2006 National Census, the village's population was 1,958 in 285 households. The following census in 2011 counted 2,142 people in 475 households. The 2016 census measured the population of the village as 2,132 people in 530 households. It was the most populous village in its rural district.
