= Sadat-e Nejat Bozorg =

Sadat-e Nejat Bozorg سادات نجات بزرگ
- Village
- Country: Iran
- Province: Khuzestan
- County: Shush
- Bakhsh: Shavur
- Rural District: Ahudasht

Population (2006)
  - Total: 325
- Time zone: UTC+3:30 (IRST)
  - Summer (DST): UTC+4:30 (IRDT)

Sadat-e Nejat Bozorg (Persian: سادات نجات بزرگ, also Romanized as Sādāt-e Nejāt Bozorg) is a village in Ahudasht Rural District, Shavur District, Shush County, Khuzestan Province, Iran. At the 2006 census, its population was 325, in 56 families.
