= Mohammad Safi =

Village in Khuzestan province, Iran

Mohammad Safi Persian: محمدصافي
- Village
- Location within Iran
- Coordinates: 31°57′36″N 48°09′01″E
- Country: Iran
- Province: Khuzestan
- County: Shush
- District: Fath ol Mobin
- Rural District: Chenaneh

Population (2016)
  - Total: 463
- Time zone: UTC+3:30 (IRST)

Mohammad Safi (Persian: محمدصافي) (Note: Also romanized as Moḩammad Şāfī) is a village in, and the capital of, Chenaneh Rural District of Fath ol Mobin District, Shush County, Khuzestan province, Iran.

== Demographics ==
=== Population ===
At the time of the 2006 National Census, the village's population was 424 in 49 households. The following census in 2011 counted 475 people in 102 households. The 2016 census measured the population of the village as 463 people in 81 households.
