= Seyyed Baqer =

Seyyed Baqer (Persian: سيدباقر) may refer to:

- Seyyed Baqer, Kermanshah
- Seyyed Baqer, Khuzestan
