= Juhi, Iran =

Juhi جوحي
- Village
- Location within Iran
- Coordinates: 32°00′00″N 48°17′00″E
- Country: Iran
- Province: Khuzestan
- County: Shush
- Bakhsh: Shavur
- Rural District: Shavur

Population (2006)
  - Total: 309
- Time zone: UTC+3:30 (IRST)
  - Summer (DST): UTC+4:30 (IRDT)

Juhi (Persian: جوحي, also Romanized as Jūḥī; also known as Jūkhī) is a village in Shavur Rural District, Shavur District, Shush County, Khuzestan Province, Iran. At the 2006 census, its population was 309, in 48 families.
