= Seyyed Khalaf, Shush =

Seyyed Khalaf سيدخلف
- Village
- Location within Iran
- Coordinates: 31°49′47″N 48°35′25″E
- Country: Iran
- Province: Khuzestan
- County: Shush
- Bakhsh: Shavur
- Rural District: Ahudasht

Population (2006)
  - Total: 924
- Time zone: UTC+3:30 (IRST)
  - Summer (DST): UTC+4:30 (IRDT)

Seyyed Khalaf (Persian: سيدخلف) is a village in Ahudasht Rural District, Shavur District, Shush County, Khuzestan Province, Iran. At the 2006 census, its population was 924, in 156 families.
