= Zakhireh-ye Esmail Ghanom =

Zakhireh-ye Esmail Ghanom ذخيره اسماعيل غانم
- Village
- Location within Iran
- Coordinates: 32°00′29″N 48°20′20″E
- Country: Iran
- Province: Khuzestan
- County: Shush
- Bakhsh: Shavur
- Rural District: Shavur

Population (2006)
  - Total: 1,659
- Time zone: UTC+3:30 (IRST)
  - Summer (DST): UTC+4:30 (IRDT)

Zakhireh-ye Esmail Ghanom (Persian: ذخيره اسماعيل غانم, also Romanized as Z̄akhīreh-ye Esma‘il Ghānom; also known as Mālek-e Ashtar, Z̄akhīreh, Z̄akhīreh-ye Esma‘il Khānom, and Zakhire-ye Esmā‘īl Khānom) is a village in Shavur Rural District, Shavur District, Shush County, Khuzestan Province, Iran. At the 2006 census, its population was 1,659, in 278 families.
