= Mian Ab =

Mian Ab or Miyanab or Miyan Ab (Persian: ميان اب) may refer to:

- Mian Ab, Chaharmahal and Bakhtiari
- Mian Ab, Khuzestan
- Miyan Ab District, in Khuzestan province
- Miyan Ab Rural District, in Khuzestan province
- Miyan Ab-e Jonubi Rural District, in Khuzestan province
- Miyan Ab-e Shomali Rural District, in Khuzestan province
