= Al Hai =

Al Hai may refer to:

- Al Hai, Iran
- Al Hai, alternate name of Alavi, Khuzestan, Iran
- Al-Hai District, Iraq
