= Feyay =

Feyay فياي
- Village
- Location within Iran
- Coordinates: 31°46′10″N 48°32′19″E
- Country: Iran
- Province: Khuzestan
- County: Shush
- Bakhsh: Shavur
- Rural District: Seyyed Abbas

Population (2006)
  - Total: 458
- Time zone: UTC+3:30 (IRST)
  - Summer (DST): UTC+4:30 (IRDT)

Feyay (Persian: فياي, also Romanized as Feyāy; also known as Beyt-e Fīāy, Sādāt Fāz̧el-e Do, and Şāder ‘Oqūb) is a village in Seyyed Abbas Rural District, Shavur District, Shush County, Khuzestan Province, Iran. At the 2006 census, its population was 458, in 75 families.
