= Karkha Rural District =

Rural district in Khuzestan province, Iran

Karkha Rural District Persian: دهستان کرخا
- Rural District
- Location within Iran
- Coordinates: 32°00′25″N 48°18′52″E
- Country: Iran
- Province: Khuzestan
- County: Karkheh
- District: Shavur
- Capital: Khovis
- Time zone: UTC+3:30 (IRST)

Karkha Rural District (Persian: دهستان کرخا) is in Shavur District of Karkheh County, Khuzestan province, Iran. Its capital is the village of Khovis, whose population at the time of the 2016 National Census was 3,520 in 989 households.

== History ==
In 2019, the district was separated from Shush County in the establishment of Karkheh County, and Karkha Rural District was created in the district.
