= Nejat =

Nejat (and its variants Necat, Nexhat and Nedžad) is a Turkish male name of Persian origin. The name is found in the Turkish, Albanian and Bosnian languages. The name derived from the Persian word "Nezhad or Nijâd " meaning "race and nobility" but can also mean "salvation or rescue."

== People ==
=== Given name ===
- Necat Aygün (born 1980), German footballer
- Necat Ekinci (born 1999), Turkish boxer
- Nedžad Bajrović (born 1970), Bosnian footballer
- Nedžad Botonjič (1977–2005), Slovenian footballer
- Nedžad Branković (born 1962), Bosnian politician
- Nedžad Fazlagić (born 1974), Bosnian footballer
- Nedžad Fazlija (born 1968), Bosnian Olympic sports shooter
- Nedžad Husić (born 2001), Bosnian taekwondo athlete
- Nedžad Ibrišimović (1940–2011), Bosnian writer and sculptor
- Nedžad Lomigora (born 1971), Bosnian luger
- Nedžad Mulabegović (born 1981), Croatian shot putter
- Nedžad Sinanović (born 1983), Bosnian professional basketball player
- Nedžad Verlašević (1955–2001), Yugoslav former football player
- Nedžad Žerić (born 1972), Bosnian football manager
- Nejat Alp (born 1952), Turkish musician
- Nejat Diyarbakırlı (1928–2017), Turkish basketball player
- Nejat Eczacıbaşı (1913–1993), Turkish chemist, industrialist, entrepreneur and philanthropist
- Nejat İşler (born 1972), Turkish actor
- Nejat Konuk (1928–2014), former prime minister of Northern Cyprus
- Nejat Saydam (1929–2000), Turkish film director, screenwriter and actor
- Nejat Tulgar, (1920–1984), Turkish Olympic fencer
- Nejat Tümer (1924–2011), Turkish admiral
- Nejat Uygur (1927–2013), Turkish actor and comedian
- Nenad Bijedić (1959–2011), Bosnian-Turkish football player, also known as Nejat Biyediç or Vardar
- Nexhat Agolli (1914–1949), Yugoslav Albanian politician
- Nexhat Daci (1944–2026), Kosovan politician
- Nexhat Ibrahimi (born 1959), Albanian Islamic teacher

=== Surname ===
- Ethem Nejat (1883–1921), Turkish revolutionary communist
- Hossein Nejat, Iranian military personnel

== Places ==
- Boneh-ye Nejat, a village in Shoaybiyeh-ye Gharbi Rural District, Shadravan District, Shushtar County, Khuzestan Province, Iran

== See also ==
- Necati
- Sadat-e Nejat (disambiguation)
