= Qods =

Qods may refer to:

== Geography ==
- Jerusalem, a disputed city in the Levant, sometimes known as Qods from Al-Quds, the Arabic name
- Qaleh-ye Qods, a village in Markazi Province, Iran
- Qods, Iran, a city in Tehran Province, Iran
- Qods, Semnan, a village in Semnan Province, Iran
- Shahrak-e Gharb, a suburb of Tehran, Iran, known as Qods or Shahrak-e Qods (little city of Qods)
- Shahrak-e Qods, Mahshahr, a village in Khuzestan Province, Iran

== Organizations ==
- Qods Aviation Industry Company
- Neshan-e Aqdas, Imperial Iranian Order founded in 1870
- Quds Force, a special forces unit of Iran's Revolutionary Guards

== Recreation ==
- Qods League, Iranian football (soccer) league

== See also ==
- Al-Quds (disambiguation)
- Questions on Doctrine, or QODs
- Shahrak-e Qods (disambiguation)
