= Mohammad Omar Shairzaad =

- Occupation: legislator

Mohammad Omar Shairzaad was selected to represent Kandahar Province in Afghanistan's Meshrano Jirga, the upper house of its National Legislature, in 2005. A report on Kandahar prepared at the Navy Postgraduate School stated he is from the "head of the Esteqlal (Independence) movement", that he sits on the Petitions Committee, and that he has a bachelor's degree.
