= Sri Siduhath Daham School =

Sri Siduhath Daham Pasala, Kurunduwatta -Ahangama

Information
- Type: Daham Pasal
- Motto: Sadu Sabbaththa Sanwaro (Sinhala: සාධු සබ්බත්ථ සංවරො)
- Established: 2011
- Principal: Rev. Wellamadame Wimalaseela Thero
- Grades: 1 - 11
- Enrollment: 72

Sri Siduhath Daham Pasala (Sinhala: ශ්‍රී සිදුහත් දහම් පාසල) is a daham school located in Ahangama Sri Siddhartharamaya Temple. It was initially founded as a Daham school in 2011.
