= Sadat-e Nejat =

Sadat-e Nejat or Sadat Nejat (Persian: سادات نجات) may refer to:

- Al Sadat-e Nejat
- Sadat-e Nejat Bozorg
- Sadat-e Nejat Kuchak
- Sadat Nejat, Ahvaz
