= Seyyed Khalaf =

Seyyed Khalaf (Persian: سيدخلف) may refer to:

- Seyyed Khalaf, Dasht-e Azadegan
- Seyyed Khalaf, Shush
