= FECH =

FECH may refer to:

- Ferrochelatase, a human enzyme
- University of Chile Student Federation

== See also ==
- Fech, or Sadat-e Nejatollah, a village in Iran
- Fetch (disambiguation)
