= Sadd-e Shavur =

Sadd-e Shavur سدشاوور
- Village
- Location within Iran
- Coordinates: 31°49′55″N 48°27′10″E
- Country: Iran
- Province: Khuzestan
- County: Shush
- Bakhsh: Shavur
- Rural District: Seyyed Abbas

Population (2006)
  - Total: 1,114
- Time zone: UTC+3:30 (IRST)
  - Summer (DST): UTC+4:30 (IRDT)

Sadd-e Shavur (Persian: سدشاوور, also Romanized as Sadd-e Shāvūr; also known as Alsad, Sadd-e Shāhūr, Shāhūr, and Shāvūr) is a village in Seyyed Abbas Rural District, Shavur District, Shush County, Khuzestan Province, Iran. At the 2006 census, its population was 1,114, in 214 families.
