= Saadat =

Saadat may refer to:

== People ==
- Saadat Ali Khan I
- Saadat Ali Khan II
- Saadat Bano
- Saadat Hasan Manto
- Saadat Saeed

+ Saadat Awan

== Places ==
- Sa'adat Abad
- Saadat, Iran

== See also ==
- Anwar El Sadat
- Sadat (disambiguation)
- Sadat
