= Raghiveh =

Raghiveh (Persian: رغيوه) may refer to:

- Raghiveh, Haftgel
- Raghiveh, Shush
- Raghiveh District, in Haftgel County
