= Sadat-e Nejatollah =

Sadat-e Nejatollah سادات نجات اله
- Village
- Location within Iran
- Coordinates: 31°48′35″N 48°28′51″E
- Country: Iran
- Province: Khuzestan
- County: Shush
- Bakhsh: Shavur
- Rural District: Ahudasht

Population (2006)
  - Total: 144
- Time zone: UTC+3:30 (IRST)
  - Summer (DST): UTC+4:30 (IRDT)

Sadat-e Nejatollah (Persian: سادات نجات اله, also Romanized as Sādāt-e Nejātollāh; also known as Al Sādāt-e Nejāt and Fech) is a village in Ahudasht Rural District, Shavur District, Shush County, Khuzestan Province, Iran. At the 2006 census, its population was 144, in 24 families.
