= Seyyed Saleh, Khuzestan =

Seyyed Saleh سيدصالح
- Village
- Location within Iran
- Coordinates: 31°45′33″N 48°32′34″E
- Country: Iran
- Province: Khuzestan
- County: Shush
- Bakhsh: Shavur
- Rural District: Seyyed Abbas

Population (2006)
  - Total: 179
- Time zone: UTC+3:30 (IRST)
  - Summer (DST): UTC+4:30 (IRDT)

Seyyed Saleh (Persian: سيدصالح, also Romanized as Seyyed Şāleḩ; also known as Bait Saiyid ‘Ali, Beyt-e Seyyed ‘Alī, Sādāt Fāz̧el-e 3, Sādāt Fāz̧el-e Seh, and Seyyed ‘Alī) is a village in Seyyed Abbas Rural District, Shavur District, Shush County, Khuzestan Province, Iran. At the 2006 census, its population was 179, in 31 families.
