= Necati =

Necati is a Turkish given name for males. People named Necati include:

- Necati "Neco" Arabaci (born 1972), Turkish businessman, criminal, and high-ranking member of the Hells Angels
- Necati Ateş (born 1980), Turkish footballer
- Necati Çelim (1909–1986), Turkish politician
- Necati Er (born 1997), Turkish athlete
- Necati Cumalı (1921–2001), Turkish writer
- Necati Şaşmaz (born 1971), Turkish actor
- Necati Zontul, Turkish torture and rape victim

== See also ==
- Nejat (disambiguation)
