= Fetch =

Fetch may refer to:

== Books ==
- Fetch, a 2012 book by Alan MacDonald and David Roberts
- The Fetch, a 2006 book by Chris Humphreys
- The Fetch, a 2009 book by Laura Whitcomb
- The Fetch, a 1991 book by Robert Holdstock
- Fazbear Frights #2: Fetch, a 2020 book by Scott Cawthon

== Music ==
- Fetch, a 2012 album by Moritz von Oswald Trio
- Fetch (album), a 2013 album by Melt-Banana
- The Fetch (album), a 2015 album by Linda Hoyle
- The Fetch, a 1981 album by Paul Lovens
- "The Fetch", song by Linda Hoyle from The Fetch

== Other ==
- Fetch TV, an Australian IPTV provider
- Fetch (folklore), a doppelgänger or double in Irish folklore
- Fetch (FTP client), a software FTP client
- Fetch (game), a game played between a human and a pet in which the human throws an object for the pet to retrieve
- Fetch! with Ruff Ruffman, a live-action/animated television series
- Fetch-execute cycle, a typical sequence of computer machine actions
- Fetch API, see XMLHttpRequest#Fetch alternative, a JavaScript API for retrieving internet resources
- Fetch (Infamous), a character from the inFAMOUS video game series
- Wind fetch, the length of water over which a given wind has blown

== See also ==
- FECH (disambiguation)
