= Sayed Abutalib Mozaffari =

Poet and writer (b. 1966)

Sayed Abutalib Mozaffari سید ابوطالب مظفری
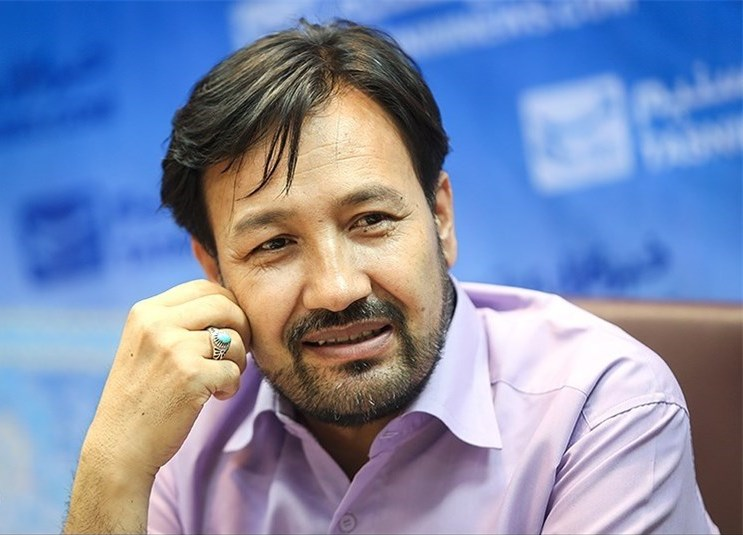
- Born: 1966 (age 59–60); Khas Urozgan, Urozgan, Kingdom of Afghanistan
- Occupations: Poet, writer

Sayed Abutalib Mozaffari (Dari: سید ابوطالب مظفری), (born 1966) is an ethnic Sadat/ Sayed poet and writer from Afghanistan.

== Early life ==
Sayed Abutalib Mozaffari was born in 1966 in Khas Urozgan District of Urozgan Province of Afghanistan. Mozzaffari is one of the famous Persian poets who printed his poetry in Iran's school books. His poetry is in the Persian language, and he has both poetry and literature in Afghanistan and Iranian languages.

== Bibliography ==
- Soognama e Balkh (Obituary of Balkh), poetry
- Payatakht e Pariyan (the capital of fairies)
- Uqab chegona mimirad (how do eagles dise)

== Media activity ==
Mozaffari published some of his poetry and writing in Dorr_e_dari magazine, which featured pieces on literature, art and culture. Mozaffari was the magazine's editor.

== See also ==
- List of Hazara people
