= Alvan, Iran =

City in Khuzestan province, Iran

Alvan Persian: الوان
- City
- Location within Iran
- Coordinates: 31°52′28″N 48°20′27″E
- Country: Iran
- Province: Khuzestan
- County: Karkheh
- District: Central

Population (2016)
  - Total: 6,860
- Time zone: UTC+3:30 (IRST)

Alvan (Persian: الوان), (Note: Also romanized as Alvān and ‘Alvān) is a city in the Central District of Karkheh County, Khuzestan province, Iran, serving as capital of both the county and the district.

== Demographics ==
=== Population ===
At the time of the 2006 National Census, the city's population was 6,100 in 1,081 households, when it was in Shavur District of Shush County. The following census in 2011 counted 7,092 people in 1,532 households. The 2016 census measured the population of the city as 6,860 people in 1,824 households.

In 2019, the district was separated from the county in the establishment of Karkheh County, and Alvan was transferred to the new Central District as the county's capital.
