= Fath ol Mobin, Iran =

City in Khuzestan province, Iran

Fath ol Mobin Persian: فتح ‌المبین
- City
- Location within Iran
- Coordinates: 32°18′53″N 48°09′02″E
- Country: Iran
- Province: Khuzestan
- County: Shush
- District: Fath ol Mobin
- Established as the municipality of Saleh Moshatat: 2010
- Renamed Fath ol Molbin: 2011

Population (2016)
  - Total: 2,973
- Time zone: UTC+3:30 (IRST)

Fath ol Mobin (Persian: فتح ‌المبین) (Note: Formerly the village of Saleh Moshatat (صالح مشطت), also romanized as Şāleḥ Moshaṭat and Şāleḥmoshaṭat) is a city in, and the capital of, Fath ol Mobin District of Shush County, Khuzestan province, Iran. It also serves as the administrative center for Sorkheh Rural District.

== Demographics ==
=== Population ===
At the time of the 2006 National Census, the population was 2,428 in 374 households, when it was the village of Saleh Moshatat in Sorkheh Rural District. The following census in 2011 counted 2,769 people in 594 households, by which time the village had been elevated to the status of a city. The 2016 census measured the population of the city as 2,973 people in 722 households, when the city had been renamed Fath ol Mobin.
