= Sadat Museum =

Museum in Alexandria, Egypt

- متحف السادات
- Established: 17 February 2009
- Location: Alexandria, Egypt
- Coordinates: 31.208834°N 29.909122°E
- Type: Cultural museum
- Key holdings: Personal belongings of Anwar Sadat
- Founder: Bibliotheca Alexandrina

The Sadat Museum is a cultural museum in Alexandria, Egypt, dedicated to the legacy of Egyptian president Anwar Al Sadat. It was inaugurated on February 17, 2009, by Suzanne Mubarak and Jehan Al Sadat and is located next to the planetarium of the Bibliotheca Alexandrina, encompassing 200 square meters. The museum also launched an internet website that contains videos, images and documents about Sadat. The Museum holds the military uniform Sadat was wearing when he was assassinated, his desk, radio and some of the swords he received from Arab countries. The web collection contains 14,000 images and 61 hours of video.

== Contents ==
The museum features several decorations, medals and necklaces obtained by the late President during the various stages of his life. His radio, desk and library are also on display, with a collection of rare books, which were given to him by various nations. Portraits of Sadat, including one by artist Etemad Al Tarablosi are displayed throughout the museum. The museum also includes his personal walking stick, Marshal stick, and a collection of Arab swords, which he received as gifts from Arab states of the Persian Gulf. The museum also contains commemorative shields, which were addressed to him on different occasions. Sadat's pipe, and cloak, which he wore during his visit to his birthplace in the village of Mit Abul Kom in northern Egypt, are also included in the vast collection of the museum. A recording of Sadat reciting the Qur'an, a short story he wrote and some video recordings, were donated by Jehan Al Sadat to the museum.

The museum was developed as part of the Bibliotheca Alexandrina's project to document Egypt's modern and contemporary history. Hussein El-Shaboury, a professor at the Faculty of Fine Arts, selected the museum's location and handled its display design.

== Gallery ==
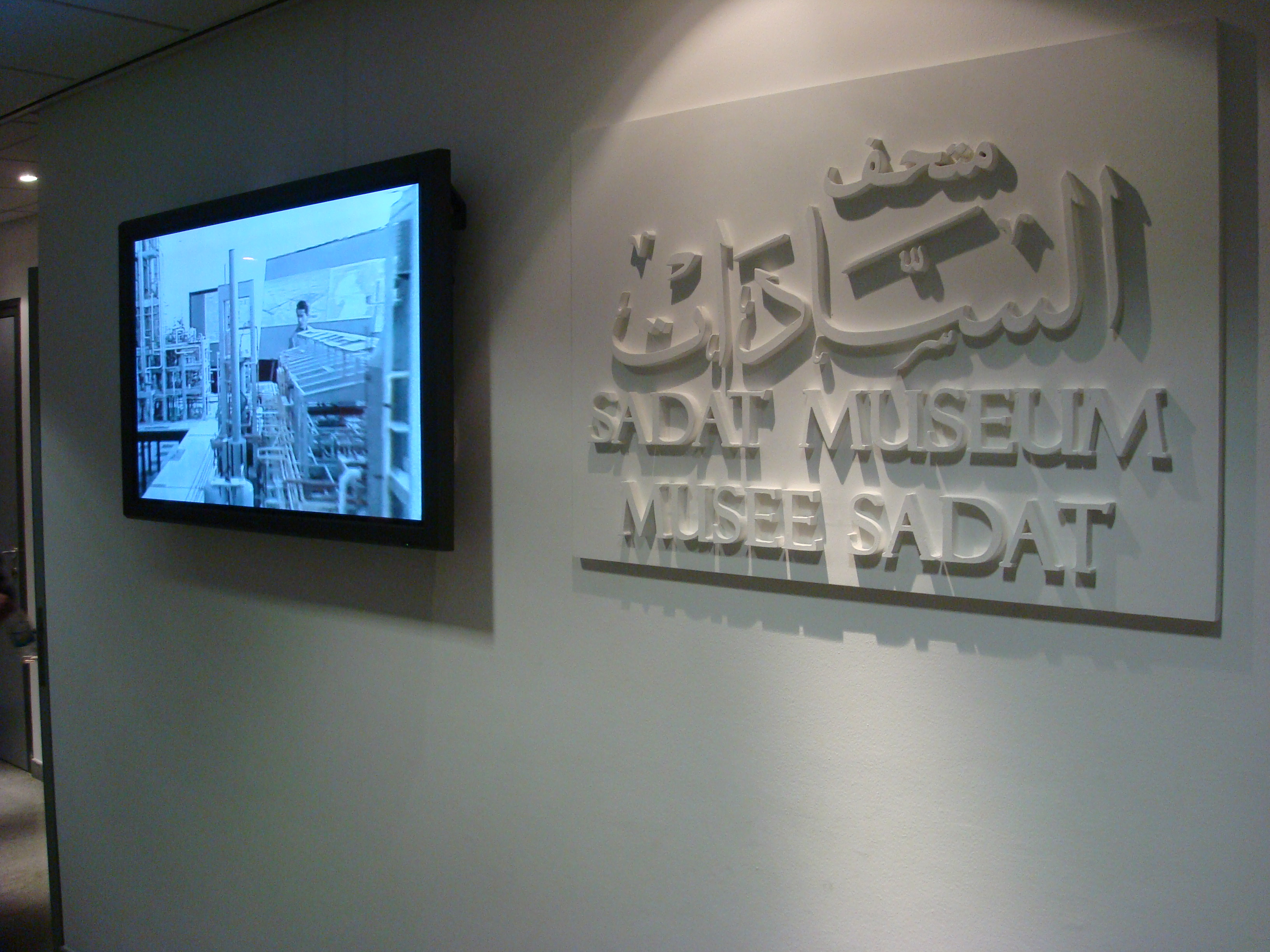
Entrance to the museum

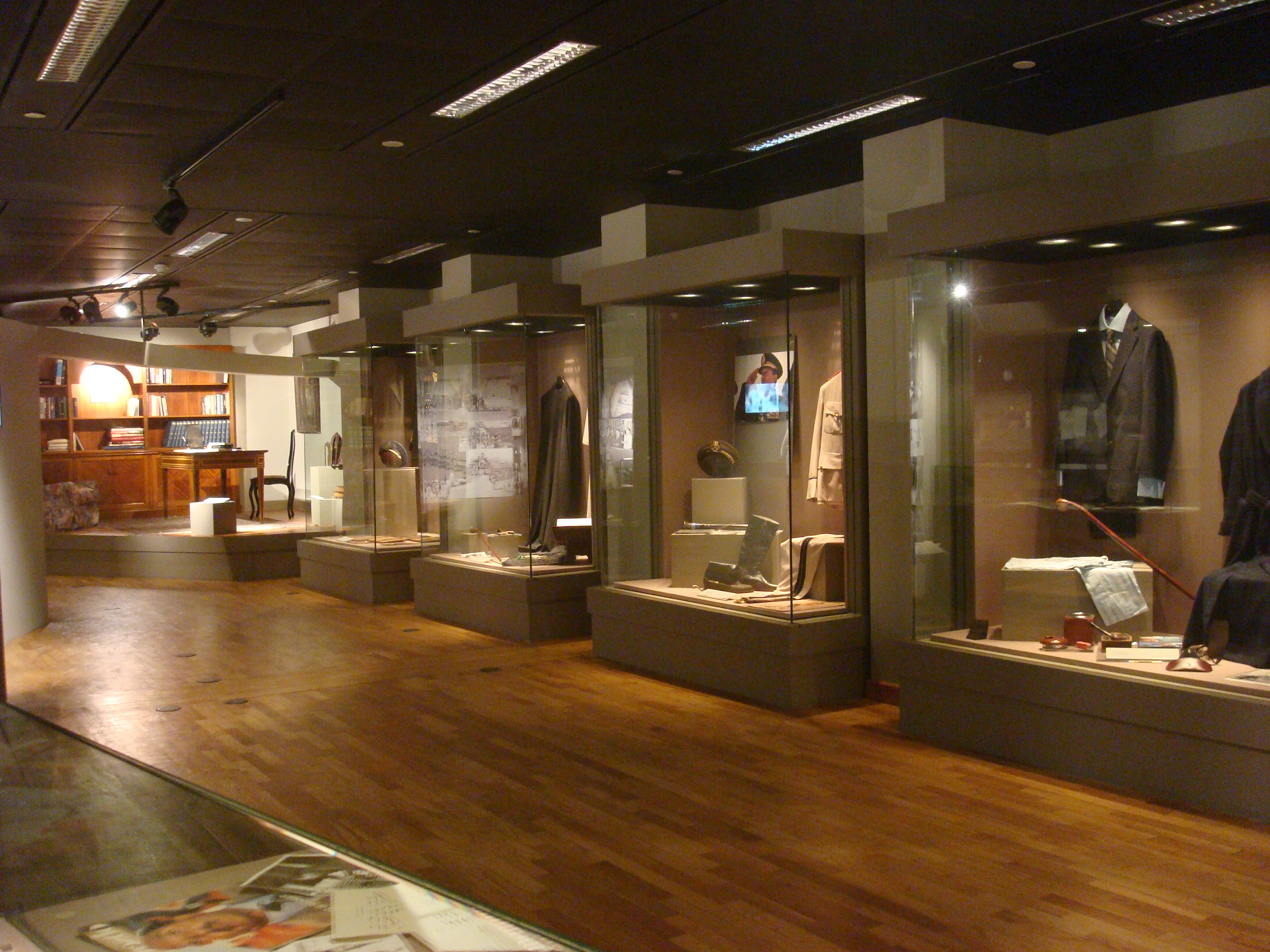
The galleries stacked in the museum

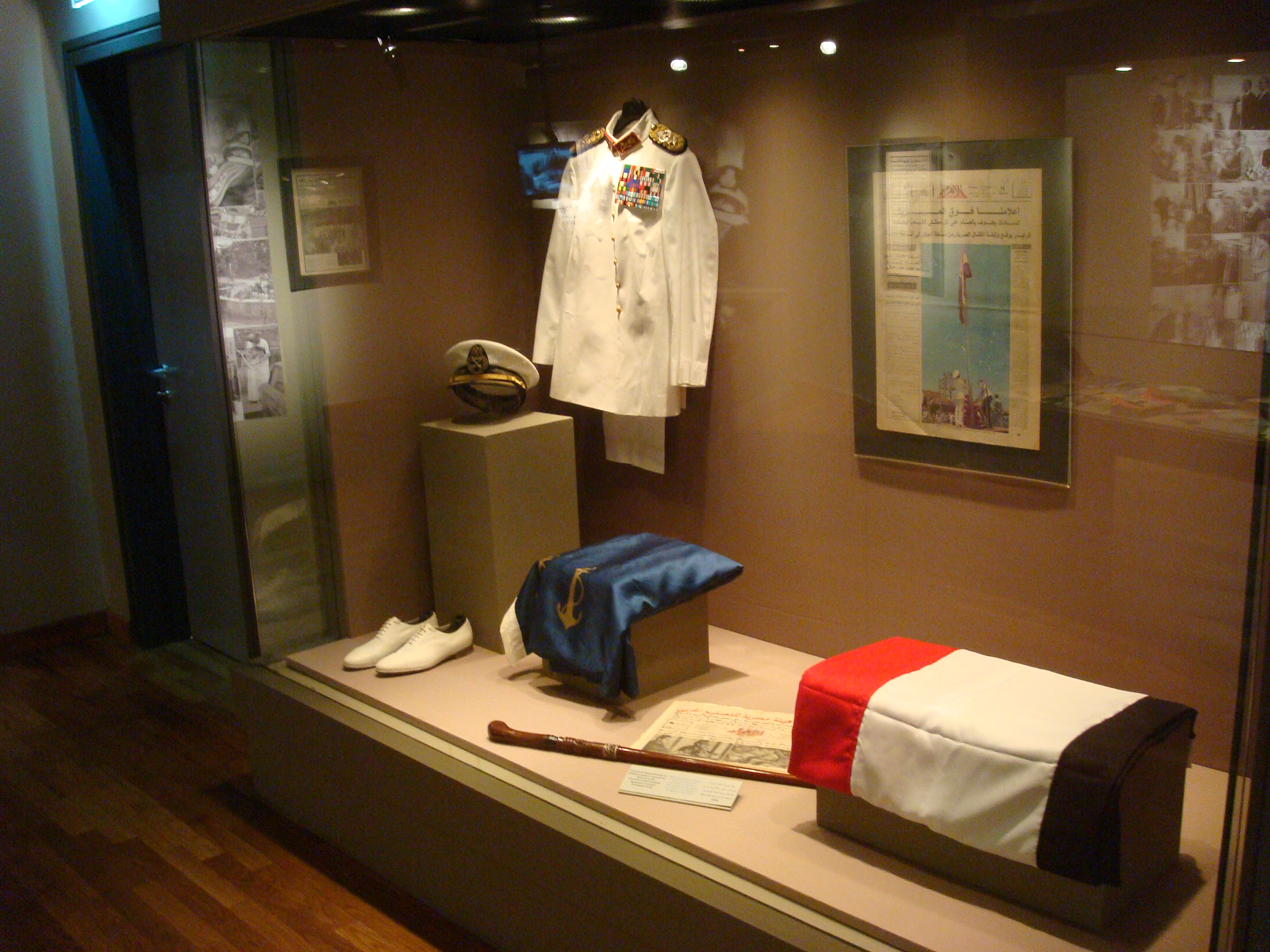
Military uniform of Sadat

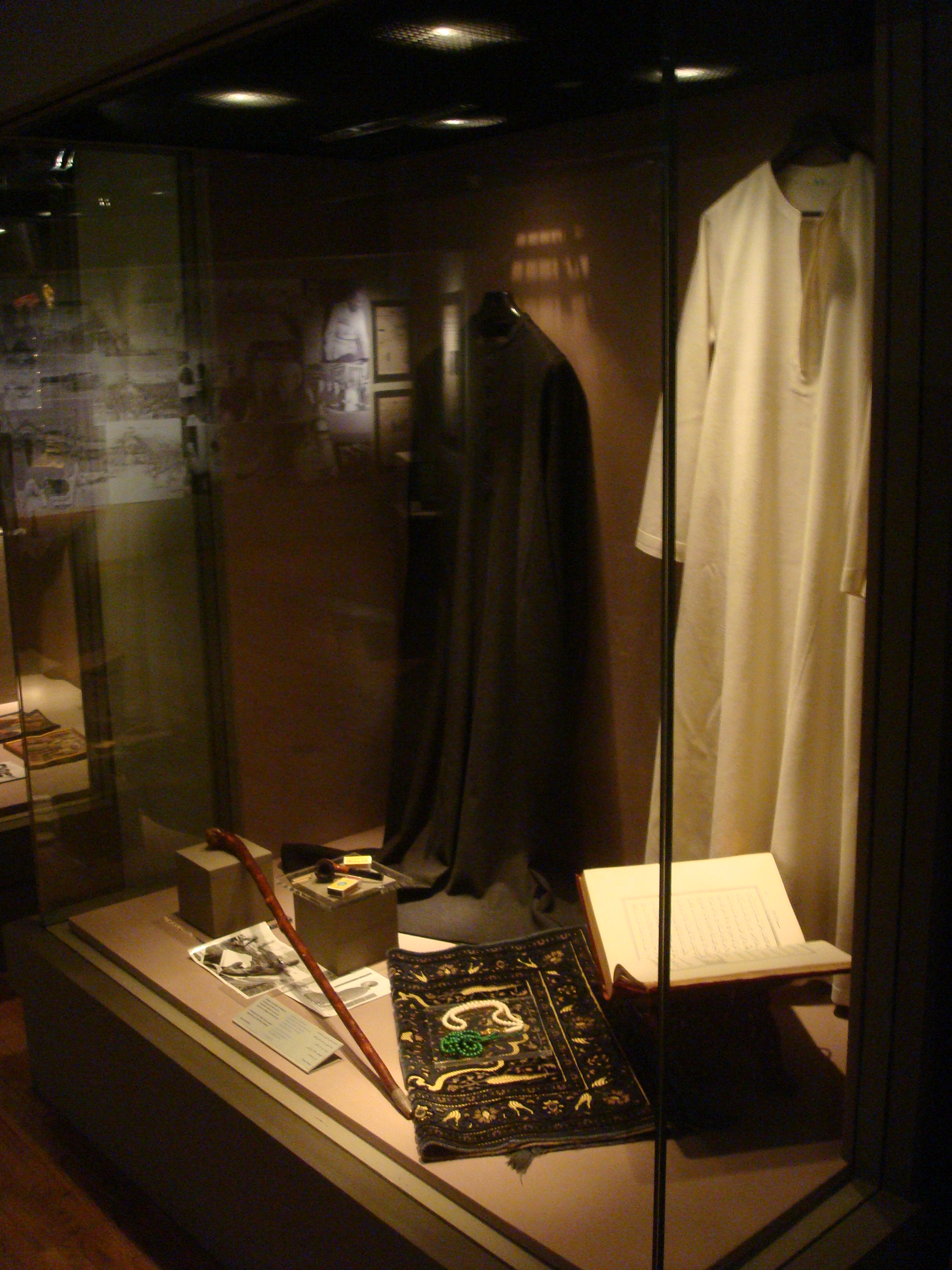

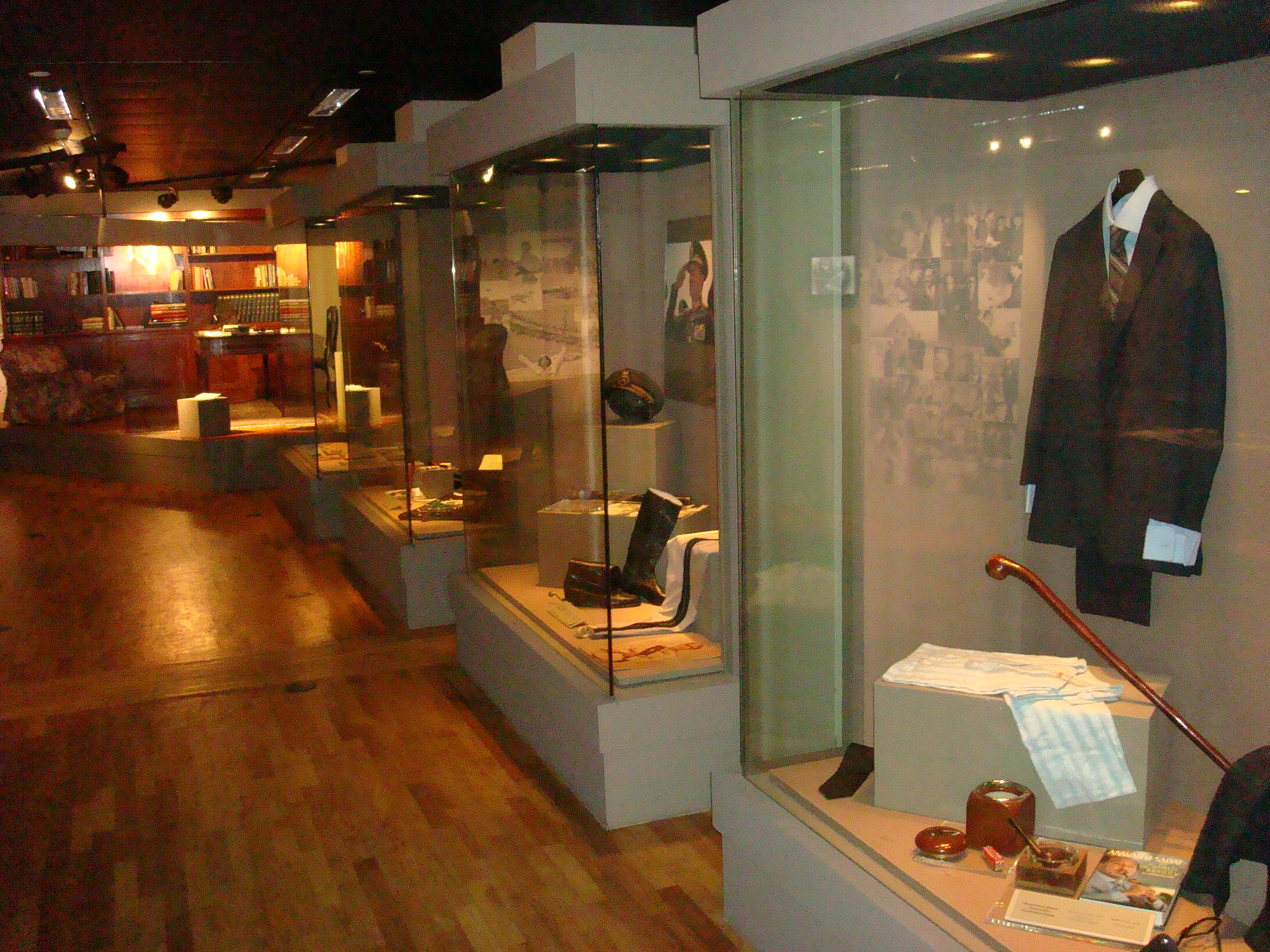

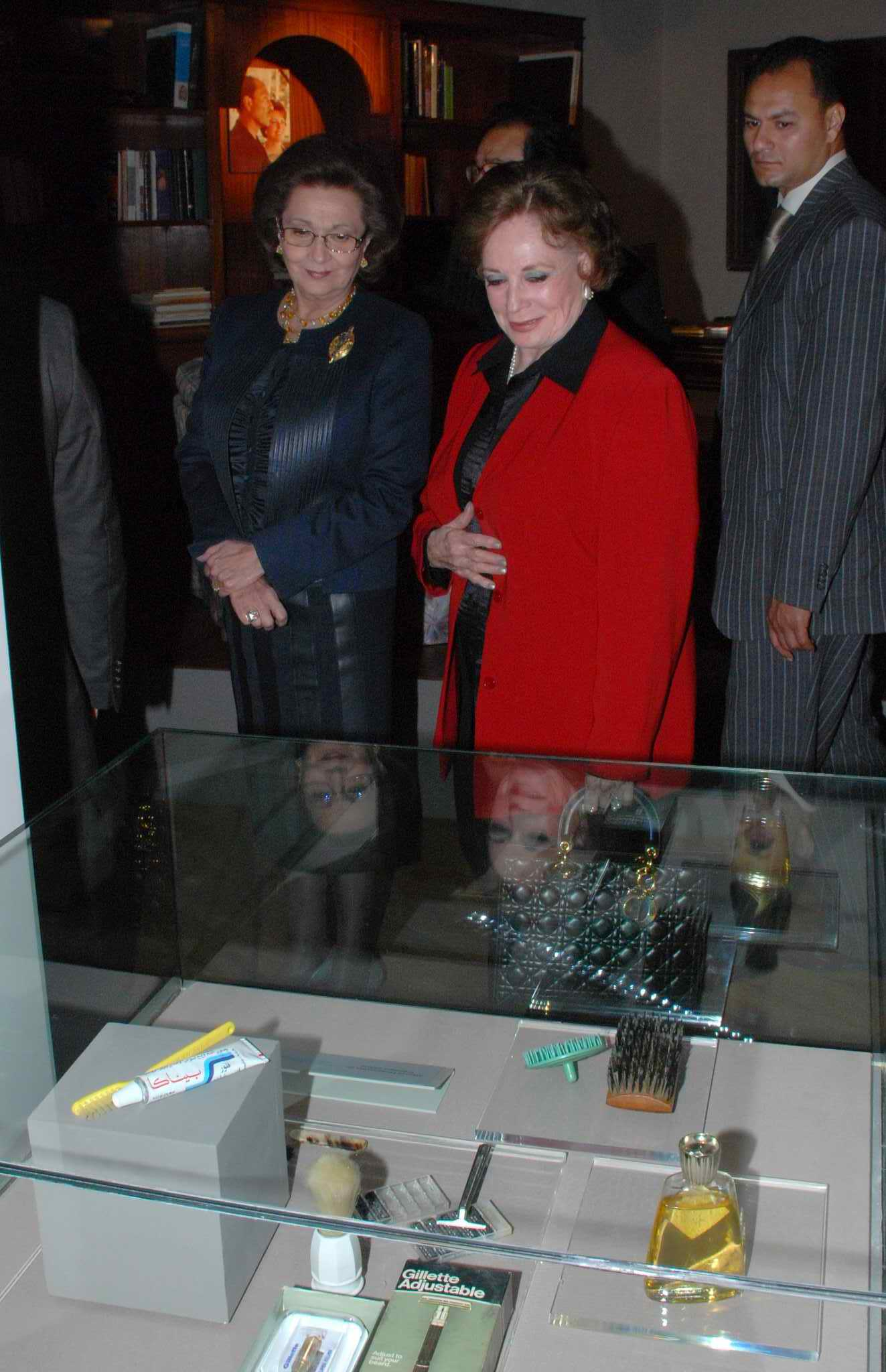
Jehan Sadat and Suzanne Mubarak at the inauguration ceremony

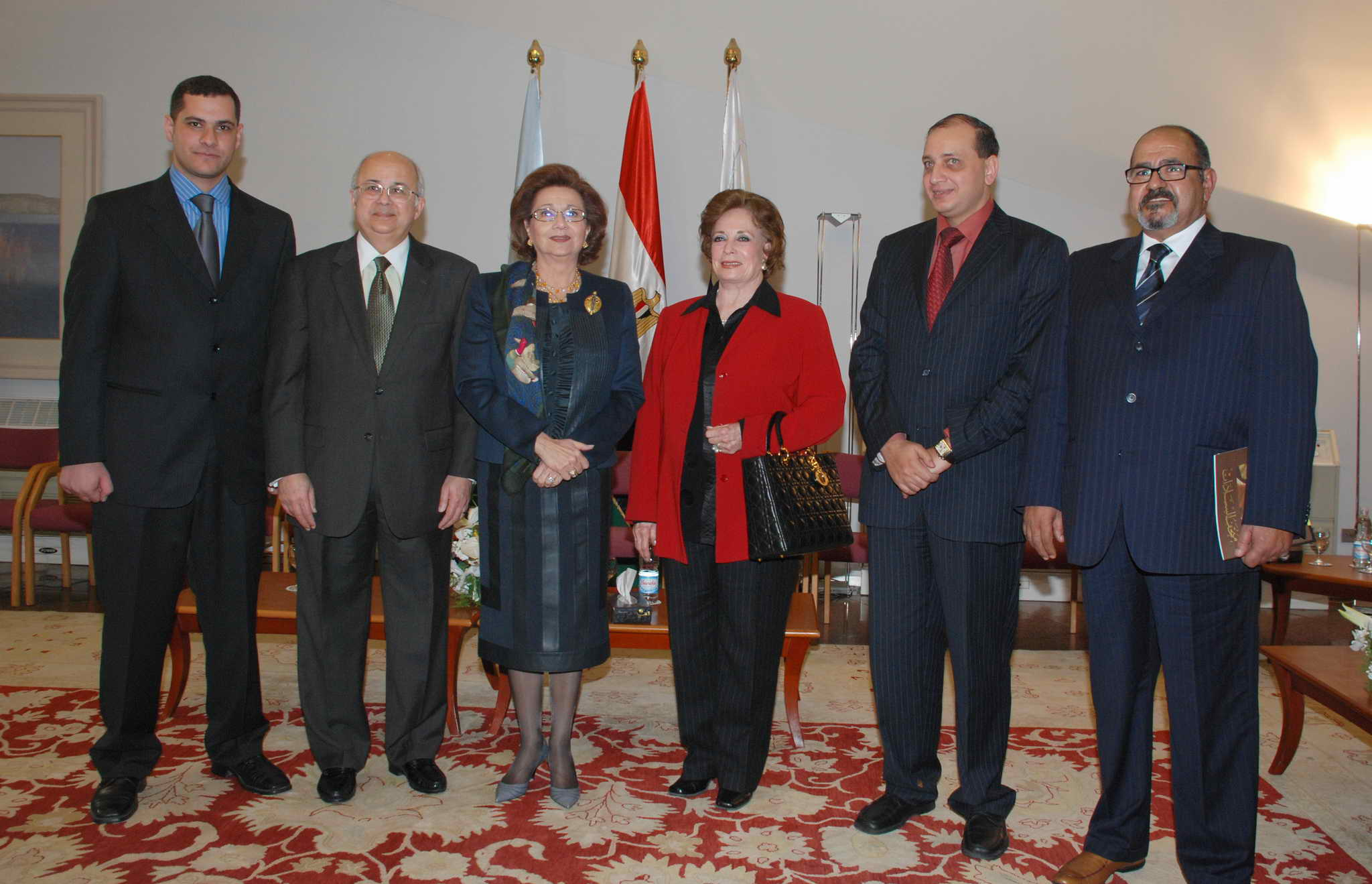

Video of the inauguration ceremony
