= Sadat-e Mohammad Ebrahim =

Sadat-e Mohammad Ebrahim سادات محمدابراهيم
- Village
- Location within Iran
- Coordinates: 31°49′57″N 50°08′21″E
- Country: Iran
- Province: Khuzestan
- County: Izeh
- Bakhsh: Dehdez
- Rural District: Donbaleh Rud-e Shomali

Population (2006)
  - Total: 55
- Time zone: UTC+3:30 (IRST)
  - Summer (DST): UTC+4:30 (IRDT)

Sadat-e Mohammad Ebrahim (Persian: سادات محمدابراهيم, also Romanized as Sādāt-e Moḩammad Ebrāhīm) is a village in Donbaleh Rud-e Shomali Rural District, Dehdez District, Izeh County, Khuzestan Province, Iran. At the 2006 census, its population was 55, in 9 families.
