= Zobeydeh-ye Ariyez =

Zobeydeh-ye Ariyez زبيده عريض
- Village
- Location within Iran
- Coordinates: 31°20′25″N 49°30′33″E
- Country: Iran
- Province: Khuzestan
- County: Ramhormoz
- Bakhsh: Central
- Rural District: Howmeh-ye Gharbi

Population (2006)
  - Total: 215
- Time zone: UTC+3:30 (IRST)
  - Summer (DST): UTC+4:30 (IRDT)

Zobeydeh-ye Ariyez (Persian: زبيده عريض, also Romanized as Zobeydeh-ye ‘Arīyeẕ; also known as Zobeyd-e ‘Arīyeẕ and Zubeyd) is a village in Howmeh-ye Gharbi Rural District, in the Central District of Ramhormoz County, Khuzestan Province, Iran. At the 2006 census, its population was 215, in 39 families.
