= Seyyed Baqer, Kermanshah =

Seyyed Baqer سيدباقر
- Village
- Location within Iran
- Coordinates: 34°25′21″N 46°10′47″E
- Country: Iran
- Province: Kermanshah
- County: Dalahu
- Bakhsh: Central
- Rural District: Bivanij

Population (2006)
  - Total: 26
- Time zone: UTC+3:30 (IRST)
  - Summer (DST): UTC+4:30 (IRDT)

Seyyed Baqer (Persian: سيدباقر, also Romanized as Seyyed Bāqer) is a village in Bivanij Rural District, in the Central District of Dalahu County, Kermanshah Province, Iran. At the 2006 census, its population was 26, in 4 families.
