= Shahrak-e Malek-e Ashtar =

Shahrak-e Malek-e Ashtar شهرك مالك اشتر
- Village
- Location within Iran
- Coordinates: 31°23′06″N 49°55′05″E
- Country: Iran
- Province: Khuzestan
- County: Bagh-e Malek
- Bakhsh: Seydun
- Rural District: Seydun-e Shomali

Population (2006)
  - Total: 174
- Time zone: UTC+3:30 (IRST)
  - Summer (DST): UTC+4:30 (IRDT)

Shahrak-e Malek-e Ashtar (Persian: شهرك مالك اشتر, also Romanized as Shahrak-e Mālek-e Ashtar; also known as Mālek-e Ashtar) is a village in Seydun-e Shomali Rural District, Seydun District, Bagh-e Malek County, Khuzestan Province, Iran. At the 2006 census, its population was 174, in 34 families.
