= Zabideh, South Khorasan =

Zabideh زبيده
- Village
- Location within Iran
- Coordinates: 32°23′28″N 59°46′17″E
- Country: Iran
- Province: South Khorasan
- County: Sarbisheh
- Bakhsh: Central
- Rural District: Momenabad

Population (2006)
  - Total: 68
- Time zone: UTC+3:30 (IRST)
  - Summer (DST): UTC+4:30 (IRDT)

Zabideh (Persian: زبيده, also Romanized as Zābīdeh, Zobeideh, and Zobeydeh; also known as Zabīden) is a village in Momenabad Rural District, in the Central District of Sarbisheh County, South Khorasan Province, Iran. At the 2006 census, its population was 68, in 16 families.
