= Juhi (name) =

- Pronunciation: joo he
- Gender: Female

Origin
- Meaning: jasmine flower
- Region of origin: India

Juhi is an Indian given name which means "jasmine flower".

== Notable people named Juhi ==
- Juhi Babbar (born 1979), Indian Hindi film actress, daughter of Raj Babbar
- Juhi Chawla (born 1967), Indian film actress and 1984 Miss India beauty contest winner
- Juhi Chaturvedi (born 1975), Indian author, columnist, and speaker
- Juhi Dewangan (born 1994), Indian badminton player
- Juhi Parmar (born 1980), Indian anchor, dancer, singer, television actress and presenter
- Juhi Rustagi (born 1998), Indian model and television actress
