= Seyyed Abdollah, Fars =

Seyyed Abdollah سيدعبداله
- Village
- Location within Iran
- Coordinates: 30°10′31″N 51°49′34″E
- Country: Iran
- Province: Fars
- County: Mamasani
- Bakhsh: Central
- Rural District: Jowzar

Population (2006)
  - Total: 39
- Time zone: UTC+3:30 (IRST)
  - Summer (DST): UTC+4:30 (IRDT)

Seyyed Abdollah (Persian: سيدعبداله, also Romanized as Seyyed 'Abdollah and Seyyedabdollah) is a village in Jowzar Rural District, in the Central District of Mamasani County, Fars province, Iran. At the 2006 census, its population was 39, in 9 families.
