= Central District (Karkheh County) =

District in Khuzestan province, Iran

Central District (Karkheh County) Persian: بخش مرکزی شهرستان کرخه
- District
- Location within Iran
- Coordinates: 31°49′40″N 48°20′04″E
- Country: Iran
- Province: Khuzestan
- County: Karkheh
- Capital: Alvan
- Time zone: UTC+3:30 (IRST)

The Central District of Karkheh County (Persian: بخش مرکزی شهرستان کرخه) is in Khuzestan province, Iran. Its capital is the city of Alvan, whose population at the time of the 2016 National Census was 6,860 in 1,824 households.

== History ==
In 2019, Shavur District was separated from Shush County in the establishment of Karkheh County, which was divided into two districts of two rural districts each, with Alvan as its capital.

== Demographics ==
=== Administrative divisions ===
Central District (Karkheh County)
Administrative Divisions
Ahudasht RD
Seyyed Abbas RD
Alvan (city)
RD = Rural District
