= Puzeh Sefid =

Puzeh Sefid پوزه سفيد
- Village
- Location within Iran
- Coordinates: 30°37′00″N 51°50′00″E
- Country: Iran
- Province: Kohgiluyeh and Boyer-Ahmad
- County: Boyer-Ahmad
- Bakhsh: Central
- Rural District: Kakan

Population (2006)
  - Total: 47
- Time zone: UTC+3:30 (IRST)
  - Summer (DST): UTC+4:30 (IRDT)

Puzeh Sefid (Persian: پوزه سفيد, also Romanized as Pūzeh Sefīd; also known as Bard Espīd, Mālek-e Ashtar, and Pūzeh Bardā Sepīd) is a village in Kakan Rural District, in the Central District of Boyer-Ahmad County, Kohgiluyeh and Boyer-Ahmad Province, Iran. At the 2006 census, its population was 47, in 12 families.
