= Sadat =

Sadat (Arabic: سادات) is a suffix, which is given to families

Sayyid/ Sayed is an honorific title of Hasanid and Husaynid lineage, recognized as descendants of the Islamic prophet Muhammad through his daughter Fatima and Ali's sons Hasan and Husayn. The title may also refer to the descendants of the family of the Bani Hashim through the Prophet's great-grandfather Hashim, and others including Hamza, Abbas, Abu Talib, and Asad ibn Hashim.

Sayyid

can also be a given name in some countries.

== Notable people with this name ==
- Sadat Abul Masud (active 1972), Indian judge
- Sadat Bukari (born 1989), Ghanaian footballer
- Sadat Hossain (born 1984), Bangladeshi author, film-maker and novelist
- Sadat Karim (born 1991), Ghanaian footballer
- Sadat Mansoor Naderi (born 1977), Afghan businessman
- Sadat Okoriko (born 1988), Togolese footballer
- Anwar Sadat (1918–1981), former president of Egypt
- Jehan Sadat (1933–2021), widow of Anwar Sadat
- Sayed Aismail Balkhi, Scholar, poet, writer, and political activist (1918)
- Ghulam Muhammad Ghobar, Historian, writer, poet, journalist, and political activist (1897- 1978)
- Alka Sadat, Film producer
- Roya Sadat, Film producer
- Sayed Abutalib Mozaffari, Poet and Writer
- Ali Khamenei, Supreme leader of Iran since
- Ali al-Sistani, Islamic scholar (born 1930)
- Sadiq al-Shirazi, Islamic Scholar
- Sayed Muhsin al-Hakim, Islamic scholar
- Ghazal Sadat, Afghan Singer
- Hassan Nasrallah, Security- General of Hezbollah
- Sayed Askar Mousavi, Writer
- Sayed Mustafa Kazemi, Afghan politician
- Sayed Hussein Anwari, Afghan politician
- Syed Hussain Jahania Gardezi
- Sayed Mir Muhammad Alim Khan
- Sayed Jafar Naderi
- Sayyid Akbar, Pakistan
- Sayyid Theyazin bin Haitham
- Sayyid Ibraheem Khaleel Al Bukhari
- Sayyid Danyal
- Atef Sadat, Egyptian Air Force pilot
- Nazmus Sadat (born 1986), Bangladeshi cricketer
- Talaat Sadat (1954–2011), Egyptian politician
- Zallascht Sadat (born 1986), Afghan and German model
- Abu Sadat Mohammad Sayem (1916–1997), Bangladeshi jurist and statesman
- Sadat Tebazaalwa (born 1985), Ugandan boxer
- Sadat X (born Derek Murphy, 1968), American rapper

== See also ==
- Saadat (disambiguation)
- SADAT International Defense Consultancy, a Turkish private military company
