= Minab, Sistan and Baluchestan =

Minab ميناب
- Village
- Location within Iran
- Coordinates: 25°47′21″N 61°06′09″E
- Country: Iran
- Province: Sistan and Baluchestan
- County: Qasr-e Qand
- Bakhsh: Talang
- Rural District: Talang

Population (2006)
  - Total: 37
- Time zone: UTC+3:30 (IRST)
  - Summer (DST): UTC+4:30 (IRDT)

Minab (Persian: ميناب, also Romanized as Mīnāb) is a village in Talang Rural District, Talang District, Qasr-e Qand County, Sistan and Baluchestan Province, Iran. At the 2006 census, its population was 37, in 7 families.
