= Sadat-e Chahan =

Sadat-e Chahan سادات چاهن
- Village
- Location within Iran
- Coordinates: 31°22′50″N 50°41′05″E
- Country: Iran
- Province: Kohgiluyeh and Boyer-Ahmad
- County: Boyer-Ahmad
- Bakhsh: Margown
- Rural District: Zilayi

Population (2006)
  - Total: 1,177
- Time zone: UTC+3:30 (IRST)
  - Summer (DST): UTC+4:30 (IRDT)

Sadat-e Chahan (Persian: سادات چاهن, also Romanized as Sādāt-e Chāhan; also known as Sa‘adat and Sādāt) is a village in Zilayi Rural District, Margown District, Boyer-Ahmad County, Kohgiluyeh and Boyer-Ahmad Province, Iran. At the 2006 census, its population was 1,177, in 229 families.
