= Shahrak-e Qods, Mahshahr =

Shahrak-e Qods شهرك قدس
- Village
- Location within Iran
- Coordinates: 30°39′15″N 49°11′35″E
- Country: Iran
- Province: Khuzestan
- County: Mahshahr
- Bakhsh: Central
- Rural District: Jarahi

Population (2006)
  - Total: 1,416
- Time zone: UTC+3:30 (IRST)
  - Summer (DST): UTC+4:30 (IRDT)

Shahrak-e Qods (Persian: شهرك قدس) is a village in Jarahi Rural District, in the Central District of Mahshahr County, Khuzestan Province, Iran. At the 2006 census, its population was 1,416, in 248 families.
