= Mian Ab, Chaharmahal and Bakhtiari =

Mian Ab ميان اب
- Village
- Location within Iran
- Coordinates: 31°17′42″N 51°12′17″E
- Country: Iran
- Province: Chaharmahal and Bakhtiari
- County: Lordegan
- Bakhsh: Falard
- Rural District: Falard

Population (2006)
  - Total: 446
- Time zone: UTC+3:30 (IRST)
  - Summer (DST): UTC+4:30 (IRDT)

Mian Ab (Persian: ميان اب, also Romanized as Mīān Āb; also known as Mīnāb) is a village in Falard Rural District, Falard District, Lordegan County, Chaharmahal and Bakhtiari Province, Iran. At the 2006 census, its population was 446, in 82 families. The village is populated by Lurs.
