= Shavur, Iran =

City in Khuzestan province, Iran

Shavur Persian: شاوور
- City
- Location within Iran
- Coordinates: 32°03′22″N 48°18′20″E
- Country: Iran
- Province: Khuzestan
- County: Karkheh
- District: Shavur

Population (2016)
  - Total: 8,833
- Time zone: UTC+3:30 (IRST)

Shavur (Persian: شاوور) (Note: Also romanized as Shāvūr; also known as Shāhūr and Shahvar; formerly the village of Rashk-e Shavur (راشك شاوور), also known as Rashk-e Shāhūr and Rashk-e Shāhvār; also known as Moslem Ebn-e ‘Aqīl) is a city in, and the capital of, Shavur District of Karkheh County, Khuzestan province, Iran. The previous capital of the district was the village of Abdol Khan-e Pain. As the village of Rashk-e Shavur, Shavur was the capital of Shavur Rural District until its capital as transferred to the village of Seyyed Rahimeh.

== Demographics ==
=== Population ===
At the time of the 2006 National Census, the population was 8,344 in 1,294 households, when it was the village of Rashk-e Shavur in Shavur Rural District of Shush County. The following census in 2011 counted 9,330 people in 2,217 households, by which time the village had been elevated to city status as Shavur. The 2016 census measured the population of the city as 8,833 people in 2,438 households.

In 2019, the district was separated from the county in the establishment of Karkheh County.
