= Tavaher =

Tavaher طواهر
- Village
- Location within Iran
- Coordinates: 31°41′25″N 48°36′03″E
- Country: Iran
- Province: Khuzestan
- County: Ahvaz
- Bakhsh: Central
- Rural District: Elhayi

Population (2006)
  - Total: 435
- Time zone: UTC+3:30 (IRST)
  - Summer (DST): UTC+4:30 (IRDT)

Tavaher (Persian: طواهر, also Romanized as Ţavāher; also known as Sādāt, Sādāt Nejāt, and Sādāt Tavāher) is a village in Elhayi Rural District, in the Central District of Ahvaz County, Khuzestan Province, Iran. At the 2006 census, its population was 435, in 67 families.
