= Karkheh County =

County in Khuzestan province, Iran

Karkheh County Persian: شهرستان کرخه
- County
- Location of Karkheh County in Khuzestan province (center left, green)

- Location of Khuzestan province in Iran
- Coordinates: 31°54′N 48°24′E
- Country: Iran
- Province: Khuzestan
- Capital: Alvan
- Districts: Central, Shavur
- Time zone: UTC+3:30 (IRST)

Karkheh County (Persian: شهرستان کرخه) is in Khuzestan province, Iran. Its capital is the city of Alvan, whose population at the time of the 2016 National Census was 6,860 in 1,824 households.

== History ==
In 2019, Shavur District was separated from Shush County in the establishment of Karkheh County, which was divided into two districts of two rural districts each, with Alvan as its capital.

== Demographics ==
=== Administrative divisions ===
Karkheh County's administrative structure is shown in the following table.

Karkheh County
Administrative Divisions
Central District
Ahudasht RD
Seyyed Abbas RD
Alvan (city)
Shavur District
Karkha RD
Shavur RD
Shavur (city) (Note: Formerly the village of Rashk-e Shavur)
RD: Rural District

== See also ==
Media related to Karkheh County at Wikimedia Commons
