= Sorkheh Rural District =

Rural district in Khuzestan province, Iran

Sorkheh Rural District Persian: دهستان سرخه
- Rural District
- Location within Iran
- Coordinates: 32°20′25″N 48°03′13″E
- Country: Iran
- Province: Khuzestan
- County: Shush
- District: Fath ol Mobin
- Capital: Fath ol Mobin

Population (2016)
  - Total: 6,666
- Time zone: UTC+3:30 (IRST)

Sorkheh Rural District (Persian: دهستان سرخه) is in Fath ol Mobin District of Shush County, Khuzestan province, Iran. It is administered from the city of Fath ol Mobin. (Note: Formerly the village of Saleh Moshatat)

== Demographics ==
=== Population ===
At the time of the 2006 National Census, the rural district's population was 8,286 in 1,261 households. There were 6,374 inhabitants in 1,390 households at the following census of 2011. The 2016 census measured the population of the rural district as 6,666 in 1,625 households. The most populous of its 44 villages was Saleh Davud, with 2,132 people.
