= Shavur Rural District =

Rural district in Khuzestan province, Iran

Shavur Rural District Persian: دهستان شاوور
- Rural District
- Location within Iran
- Coordinates: 32°00′01″N 48°25′56″E
- Country: Iran
- Province: Khuzestan
- County: Karkheh
- District: Shavur
- Capital: Seyyed Rahimeh

Population (2016)
  - Total: 10,154
- Time zone: UTC+3:30 (IRST)

Shavur Rural District (Persian: دهستان شاوور) is in Shavur District of Karkheh County, Khuzestan province, Iran. Its capital is the village of Seyyed Rahimeh. The previous capital of the rural district was the village of Rashk-e Shavur, now the city of Shavur.

== Demographics ==
=== Population ===
At the time of the 2006 National Census, the rural district's population (as a part of Shush County) was 17,578 in 2,695 households. There were 10,031 inhabitants in 2,280 households at the following census of 2011. The 2016 census measured the population of the rural district as 10,154 in 2,716 households. The most populous of its 21 villages was Khovis, with 3,520 people.

In 2019, the district was separated from the county in the establishment of Karkheh County.
