= Chenaneh Rural District =

Rural district in Khuzestan province, Iran

Chenaneh Rural District Persian: دهستان چنانه
- Rural District
- Location within Iran
- Coordinates: 32°03′06″N 47°58′08″E
- Country: Iran
- Province: Khuzestan
- County: Shush
- District: Fath ol Mobin
- Capital: Mohammad Safi

Population (2016)
  - Total: 6,436
- Time zone: UTC+3:30 (IRST)

Chenaneh Rural District (Persian: دهستان چنانه) is in Fath ol Mobin District of Shush County, Khuzestan province, Iran. Its capital is the village of Mohammad Safi.

== Demographics ==
=== Population ===
At the time of the 2006 National Census, the rural district's population was 5,849 in 814 households. There were 6,369 inhabitants in 1,368 households at the following census of 2011. The 2016 census measured the population of the rural district as 6,436 in 1,579 households. The most populous of its 30 villages was Sheykh Ali, with 673 people.

== See also ==
}
