= Ahudasht Rural District =

Rural district in Khuzestan province, Iran

Ahudasht Rural District Persian: دهستان آهودشت
- Rural District
- Location within Iran
- Coordinates: 31°50′07″N 48°31′58″E
- Country: Iran
- Province: Khuzestan
- County: Karkheh
- District: Central
- Capital: Mazraeh-ye Yek

Population (2016)
  - Total: 16,511
- Time zone: UTC+3:30 (IRST)

Ahudasht Rural District (Persian: دهستان آهودشت) is in the Central District of Karkheh County, Khuzestan province, Iran. Its capital is the village of Mazraeh-ye Yek.

== Demographics ==
=== Population ===
At the time of the 2006 National Census, the rural district's population (as a part of Shavur District of Shush County) was 14,846 in 2,254 households. There were 15,733 inhabitants in 3,514 households at the following census of 2011. The 2016 census measured the population of the rural district as 16,511 in 4,214 households. The most populous of its 42 villages was Dahimi-ye Do, with 1,433 people.

In 2019, the district was separated from the county in the establishment of Karkheh County, and the rural district was transferred to the new Central District.
