= Fath ol Mobin District =

District in Khuzestan province, Iran

Fath ol Mobin District Persian: بخش فتح ‌المبین
- District
- Location within Iran
- Coordinates: 32°12′40″N 47°58′05″E
- Country: Iran
- Province: Khuzestan
- County: Shush
- Capital: Fath ol Mobin

Population (2016)
  - Total: 16,075
- Time zone: UTC+3:30 (IRST)

Fath ol Mobin District (Persian: بخش فتح‌ المبین) is in Shush County, Khuzestan province, Iran. Its capital is the city of Fath ol Mobin. (Note: Formerly the village of Saleh Moshatat)

== History ==
After the 2006 National Census, the village of Saleh Moshatat was elevated to the status of a city, whose name was changed to Fath ol Mobin after the 2016 census.

== Demographics ==
=== Population ===
At the time of the 2006 census, the district's population was 14,135 in 2,075 households. The following census in 2011 counted 15,512 people in 3,352 households. The 2016 census measured the population of the district as 16,075 inhabitants in 3,926 households.

=== Administrative divisions ===
Fath ol Mobin District Population
Administrative Divisions	2006	2011	2016
Chenaneh RD	5,849	6,369	6,436
Sorkheh RD	8,286	6,374	6,666
Fath ol Mobin (city)		2,769	2,973
Total	14,135	15,512	16,075
RD = Rural District
