= Seyyed Abbas Rural District =

Rural district in Khuzestan province, Iran

Seyyed Abbas Rural District Persian: دهستان سيدعباس
- Rural District
- Location within Iran
- Coordinates: 31°49′40″N 48°18′38″E
- Country: Iran
- Province: Khuzestan
- County: Karkheh
- District: Central
- Capital: Abdol Khan-e Pain

Population (2016)
  - Total: 27,713
- Time zone: UTC+3:30 (IRST)

Seyyed Abbas Rural District (Persian: دهستان سيدعباس) is in the Central District of Karkheh County, Khuzestan province, Iran. Its capital is the village of Abdol Khan-e Pain. (Note: Also known as Seyyed Abbas)

== Demographics ==
=== Population ===
At the time of the 2006 National Census, the rural district's population (as a part of Shavur District of Shush County) was 24,093 in 3,811 households. There were 26,865 inhabitants in 5,748 households at the following census of 2011. The 2016 census measured the population of the rural district as 27,713 in 7,071 households. The most populous of its 64 villages was Abdol Khan-e Pain, with 3,061 people.

In 2019, the district was separated from the county in the establishment of Karkheh County, and the rural district was transferred to the new Central District.
