= Shavur District =

District in Khuzestan province, Iran

Shavur District Persian: بخش شاوور
- District
- Location within Iran
- Coordinates: 31°59′42″N 48°24′29″E
- Country: Iran
- Province: Khuzestan
- County: Karkheh
- Capital: Shavur

Population (2016)
  - Total: 70,071 (Note: As a part of Shush County)
- Time zone: UTC+3:30 (IRST)

Shavur District (Persian: بخش شاوور) is in Karkheh County, Khuzestan province, Iran. Its capital is the city of Shavur. The previous capital of the district was the village of Abdol Khan-e Pain.

== History ==
After the 2006 National Census, the village of Rashk-e Shavur was elevated to city status as Shavur. In 2019, the district was separated from Shush County in the establishment of Karkheh County.

== Demographics ==
=== Population ===
At the time of the 2006 census, the district's population (as a part of Shush County) was 62,617 in 9,841 households. The following census in 2011 counted 69,051 people in 15,291 households. The 2016 census measured the population of the district as 70,071 inhabitants in 18,263 households.

=== Administrative divisions ===
Shavur District Population (Note: As a part of Shush County at the 2006, 2011, and 2016 censuses)
Administrative Divisions	2006	2011	2016
Ahudasht RD (Note: Transferred to the Central District after the 2016 census)	14,846	15,733	16,511
Karkha RD (Note: Established after the 2016 census)			
Seyyed Abbas RD	24,093	26,865	27,713
Shavur RD	17,578	10,031	10,154
Alvan (city)	6,100	7,092	6,860
Shavur (city) (Note: Formerly the village of Rashk-e Shavur)		9,330	8,833
Total	62,617	69,051	70,071
RD = Rural District
