= Shoush County =

County in Khuzestan Province, Iran

Shush County Persian: شهرستان شوش
- County
- Location of Shush County in Khuzestan province (top left, yellow)

- Location of Khuzestan Province in Iran
- Coordinates: 32°12′30″N 47°58′00″E
- Country: Iran
- Province: Khuzestan
- Capital: Shush
- Districts: Central, Fath ol Mobin

Population (2016)
  - Total: 205,720
- Time zone: UTC+3:30 (IRST)

Shoush County (Persian: شهرستان شوش) is in Khuzestan Province, Iran. Its capital is the city of Shoush. The ancient city of Susa is located in Shoush County.

== History ==
After the 2006 National Census, the village of Rashg-e Shavur was elevated to city status as Shavur. Saleh Moshatat also rose to the status of a city and was later renamed Fath ol Mobin.

In 2019, Shavur District was separated from the county in the establishment of Karkheh County.

== Demographics ==
=== Population ===
At the time of the 2006 census, the county's population was 189,793 in 33,313 households. The following census in 2011 counted 202,762 people in 47,304 households. The 2016 census measured the population of the county as 205,720, in 55,194 households.

=== Administrative divisions ===
Shoush County's population history and administrative structure over three consecutive censuses are shown in the following table.

Shoush County Population
Administrative divisions	2006	2011	2016
Central District	113,041	117,441	119,459
Ben Moala RD	9,231	10,217	10,188
Hoseynabad RD	42,074	39,439	22,946
Horr (city)	7,839	8,624	9,177
Shoush (city)	53,897	59,161	77,148
Fath ol Mobin District	14,135	15,512	16,075
Chenaneh RD	5,849	6,369	6,436
Sorkheh RD	8,286	6,374	6,666
Fath ol Mobin (city) (Note: Formerly the village of Saleh Moshatat)		2,769	2,973
Shavur District (Note: Transferred to Karkheh County)	62,617	69,051	70,071
Ahudasht RD	14,846	15,733	16,511
Seyyed Abbas RD	24,093	26,865	27,713
Shavur RD	17,578	10,031	10,154
Alvan (city)	6,100	7,092	6,860
Shavur (city) (Note: Formerly the village of Rashk-e Shavur)		9,330	8,833
Total	189,793	202,762	205,720
RD = Rural district

== See also ==
Media related to Shoush County at Wikimedia Commons
