= Amaleh =

Amaleh (Persian: عمله) may refer to:

- Amaleh-ye Olya, Kermanshah Province
- Amaleh-ye Sofla, Kermanshah Province
- Amaleh Seyf, Khuzestan Province
- Amaleh-ye Teymur, Khuzestan Province
