= Majid Abdollah =

Majid Abdollah مجيدعبداله
- Village
- Location within Iran
- Coordinates: 32°08′00″N 48°14′00″E
- Country: Iran
- Province: Khuzestan
- County: Shush
- Bakhsh: Central
- Rural District: Hoseynabad

Population (2006)
  - Total: 206
- Time zone: UTC+3:30 (IRST)
  - Summer (DST): UTC+4:30 (IRDT)

Majid Abdollah (Persian: مجيدعبداله, also Romanized as Majīd ‘Abdollāh) is a village in Hoseynabad Rural District, in the Central District of Shush County, Khuzestan Province, Iran. At the 2006 census, its population was 206, in 31 families.
