= Jariyeh =

Jariyeh (Persian: جريه) may refer to:

- Jariyeh-e Seyyed Mohammad
- Jariyeh-ye Seyyed Musa
