= Sheykh Isa, Khuzestan =

Sheykh Isa شيخ عيسي
- Village
- Location within Iran
- Coordinates: 32°08′00″N 48°16′25″E
- Country: Iran
- Province: Khuzestan
- County: Shush
- Bakhsh: Central
- Rural District: Hoseynabad

Population (2006)
  - Total: 190
- Time zone: UTC+3:30 (IRST)
  - Summer (DST): UTC+4:30 (IRDT)

Sheykh Isa (Persian: شيخ عيسي, also Romanize as Sheykh Īsá; also known as ‘Alam ol Hodá) is a village in Hoseynabad Rural District, in the Central District of Shush County, Khuzestan Province, Iran. At the 2006 census, its population was 190, in 24 families.
