= Sheykh Ali Asghar =

Eyn روستای عین
- Village
- Location within Iran
- Coordinates: 32°03′00″N 48°26′00″E
- Country: Iran
- Province: Khuzestan
- County: Shush
- Bakhsh: Central
- Rural District: Hoseynabad

Population (2006)
  - Total: 1,450
- Time zone: UTC+3:30 (IRST)
  - Summer (DST): UTC+4:30 (IRDT)

Eyn (Persian: روستای عین, also Romanized as Eyn) is a village in Hoseynabad Rural District, in the Central District of Shush County, Khuzestan Province, Iran. At the 2006 census, its population was 1,450, in 234 families.
