= Seyyed Adnan =

Seyyed Adnan سيدعدنان
- Village
- Location within Iran
- Coordinates: 32°14′12″N 48°12′30″E
- Country: Iran
- Province: Khuzestan
- County: Shush
- Bakhsh: Central
- Rural District: Ben Moala

Population (2006)
  - Total: 294
- Time zone: UTC+3:30 (IRST)
  - Summer (DST): UTC+4:30 (IRDT)

Seyyed Adnan (Persian: سيدعدنان, also Romanized as Seyyed ‘Adnān) is a village in Ben Moala Rural District, in the Central District of Shush County, Khuzestan Province, Iran. At the 2006 census, its population was 294, in 47 families.
