= Hajj-e Saleh-e Lusi =

Hajj-e Saleh-e Lusi حاج صالح لوسي
- Village
- Location within Iran
- Coordinates: 32°05′59″N 48°16′42″E
- Country: Iran
- Province: Khuzestan
- County: Shush
- Bakhsh: Central
- Rural District: Hoseynabad

Population (2006)
  - Total: 467
- Time zone: UTC+3:30 (IRST)
  - Summer (DST): UTC+4:30 (IRDT)

Hajj-e Saleh-e Lusi (Persian: حاج صالح لوسي, also Romanized as Ḩājj-e Şaleḩ-e Lūsī; also known as Şāleḩ-e Lūsī and Shahīd Dastgheyb) is a village in Hoseynabad Rural District, in the Central District of Shush County, Khuzestan Province, Iran. At the 2006 census, its population was 467, in 59 families.
