= Halvehhani =

Halvehhani حلوه هاني
- Village
- Location within Iran
- Coordinates: 32°03′31″N 48°15′33″E
- Country: Iran
- Province: Khuzestan
- County: Shush
- Bakhsh: Central
- Rural District: Hoseynabad

Population (2006)
  - Total: 323
- Time zone: UTC+3:30 (IRST)
  - Summer (DST): UTC+4:30 (IRDT)

Halvehhani (Persian: حلوه هاني, also Romanized as Ḩalvehhānī) is a village in Hoseynabad Rural District, in the Central District of Shush County, Khuzestan Province, Iran. At the 2006 census, its population was 323, in 39 families.
