= Sheykh Hanush =

Sheykh Hanush شيخ حنوش
- Village
- Location within Iran
- Coordinates: 32°12′34″N 48°12′52″E
- Country: Iran
- Province: Khuzestan
- County: Shush
- Bakhsh: Central
- Rural District: Ben Moala

Population (2006)
  - Total: 278
- Time zone: UTC+3:30 (IRST)
  - Summer (DST): UTC+4:30 (IRDT)

Sheykh Hanush (Persian: شيخ حنوش, also Romanized as Sheykh Ḩanūsh; also known as Dabbāt Zeynab and Zeynab) is a village in Ben Moala Rural District, in the Central District of Shush County, Khuzestan Province, Iran. At the 2006 census, its population was 278, in 43 families.
