= Shahrak-e Danial-e Shush =

Shahrak-e Danial-e Shush شهرك دانيال شوش
- Village
- Location within Iran
- Coordinates: 32°11′14″N 48°16′23″E
- Country: Iran
- Province: Khuzestan
- County: Shush
- Bakhsh: Central
- Rural District: Hoseynabad

Population (2006)
  - Total: 2,412
- Time zone: UTC+3:30 (IRST)
  - Summer (DST): UTC+4:30 (IRDT)

Shahrak-e Danial-e Shush (Persian: شهرك دانيال شوش, also Romanized as Shahrak-e Dānīāl-e Shūsh; also known as Shahrak-e Dānīāl) is a village in Hoseynabad Rural District, in the Central District of Shush County, Khuzestan Province, Iran. At the 2006 census, its population was 2,412, in 478 families.
