= Shahrak-e Salman-e Farsi =

Shahrak-e Salman-e Farsi شهرك سلمان فارسي
- Village
- Location within Iran
- Coordinates: 31°59′41″N 48°20′16″E
- Country: Iran
- Province: Khuzestan
- County: Shush
- Bakhsh: Central
- Rural District: Hoseynabad

Population (2006)
  - Total: 6,418
- Time zone: UTC+3:30 (IRST)
  - Summer (DST): UTC+4:30 (IRDT)

Shahrak-e Salman-e Farsi (Persian: شهرك سلمان فارسي, also Romanized as Shahrak-e Salmān-e Fārsī) is a village in Hoseynabad Rural District, in the Central District of Shush County, Khuzestan Province, Iran. At the 2006 census, its population was 6,418, in 1,294 families.
