= Darchal =

Darchal درچال
- Village
- Location within Iran
- Coordinates: 32°08′11″N 48°14′42″E
- Country: Iran
- Province: Khuzestan
- County: Shush
- Bakhsh: Central
- Rural District: Hoseynabad

Population (2006)
  - Total: 627
- Time zone: UTC+3:30 (IRST)
  - Summer (DST): UTC+4:30 (IRDT)

Darchal (Persian: درچال, also Romanized as Darchāl; also known as Balāl and Zā‘abā-ye Darchāl) is a village in Hoseynabad Rural District, in the Central District of Shush County, Khuzestan province, Iran. At the 2006 census, its population was 627, in 86 families.
