= Raddadeh =

Raddadeh رداده
- Village
- Location within Iran
- Coordinates: 32°17′00″N 48°14′00″E
- Country: Iran
- Province: Khuzestan
- County: Shush
- Bakhsh: Central
- Rural District: Ben Moala

Population (2006)
  - Total: 342
- Time zone: UTC+3:30 (IRST)
  - Summer (DST): UTC+4:30 (IRDT)

Raddadeh (Persian: رداده, also Romanized as Raddādeh and Radadeh) is a village in Ben Moala Rural District, in the Central District of Shush County, Khuzestan Province, Iran. At the 2006 census, its population was 342, in 65 families.
