= Mirzaali Khan =

Mirzaali Khan ميرزاعلي خان
- Village
- Location within Iran
- Coordinates: 32°15′00″N 48°16′00″E
- Country: Iran
- Province: Khuzestan
- County: Shush
- Bakhsh: Central
- Rural District: Hoseynabad

Population (2006)
  - Total: 417
- Time zone: UTC+3:30 (IRST)
  - Summer (DST): UTC+4:30 (IRDT)

Mirzaali Khan (Persian: ميرزاعلي خان, also Romanized as Mīrzā‘alī Khān; also known as Mīrzā‘alī) is a village in Hoseynabad Rural District, in the Central District of Shush County, Khuzestan Province, Iran. At the 2006 census, its population was 417, in 65 families.
