= Jariyeh-e Seyyed Mohammad =

Jariyeh-e Seyyed Mohammad جريه سيدمحمد
- Village
- Location within Iran
- Coordinates: 32°12′48″N 48°21′06″E
- Country: Iran
- Province: Khuzestan
- County: Shush
- Bakhsh: Central
- Rural District: Hoseynabad

Population (2006)
  - Total: 763
- Time zone: UTC+3:30 (IRST)
  - Summer (DST): UTC+4:30 (IRDT)

Jariyeh-e Seyyed Mohammad (Persian: جريه سيدمحمد, also Romanized as Jarīyeh-e Seyyed Moḩammad; also known as Qal‘eh Seyyed Moḩammad, Qal‘eh-ye Moḩammad, Shahīd Mofatteh, and Shahrak-e Mofatteh) is a village in Hoseynabad Rural District, in the Central District of Shush County, Khuzestan Province, Iran. At the 2006 census, its population was 763, in 118 families.
