= Mahmid =

Mahmid محميد
- Village
- Location within Iran
- Coordinates: 32°06′22″N 48°18′35″E
- Country: Iran
- Province: Khuzestan
- County: Shush
- Bakhsh: Central
- Rural District: Hoseynabad

Population (2006)
  - Total: 445
- Time zone: UTC+3:30 (IRST)
  - Summer (DST): UTC+4:30 (IRDT)

Mahmid (Persian: محميد, also Romanized as Maḩmīd; also known as Maḩmūd and Shahīd Moḩammad Bāqer-e Şadr) is a village in Hoseynabad Rural District, in the Central District of Shush County, Khuzestan Province, Iran. At the 2006 census, its population was 445, in 61 families.
