= Seyyed Razi, Iran =

Seyyed Razi سید رٌضی
- Village
- Location within Iran
- Coordinates: 32°11′57″N 48°18′29″E
- Country: Iran
- Province: Khuzestan
- County: Shush
- Bakhsh: Central
- Rural District: Hoseynabad

Population (2006)
  - Total: 1,376
- Time zone: UTC+3:30 (IRST)
  - Summer (DST): UTC+4:30 (IRDT)

Seyyed Razi (Persian: سيدرضي, also Romanized as Seyyed Rāẕī; also known as Razī and Shahīd Moţahharī) is a village in Hoseynabad Rural District, in the Central District of Shush County, Khuzestan Province, Iran. At the 2006 census, its population was 1,376, in 260 families.
