= Mahmud, Iran =

Mahmud (Persian: محمود), in Iran, may refer to:

- Mahmud, Khuzestan
- Mahmud, South Khorasan
