= Qaleh Nasir =

Qaleh Nasir or Qaleh-ye Nasir (Persian: قلعه نصير) may refer to:

- Qaleh-ye Nasir, Khuzestan
- Qaleh Nasir, Lorestan
- Qaleh Nasir, South Khorasan
