= Jariyeh-ye Seyyed Musa =

Jariyeh-ye Seyyed Musa جريه سيدموسي
- Village
- Country: Iran
- Province: Khuzestan
- County: Shush
- Bakhsh: Central
- Rural District: Ben Moala

Population (2006)
  - Total: 228
- Time zone: UTC+3:30 (IRST)
  - Summer (DST): UTC+4:30 (IRDT)

Jariyeh-ye Seyyed Musa (Persian: جريه سيدموسي, also Romanized as Jarīyeh-ye Seyyed Mūsá) is a village in Ben Moala Rural District, in the Central District of Shush County, Khuzestan Province, Iran. At the 2006 census, its population was 228, in 39 families.
