= Razi =

Razi (Persian: رازی) or al-Razi (Arabic: الرازی) is a name that was historically used to indicate a person coming from Ray, Iran.

== People ==
It most commonly refers to:

- Muhammad ibn Zakariya al-Razi (865–925), influential physician, alchemist and philosopher, also known by his Latinized name Rhazes or Rasis
- Abu Hatim Ahmad ibn Hamdan al-Razi (died c. 934), Isma'ili philosopher
- Fakhr al-Din al-Razi (1150–1210), influential polymath and theologian

It may also refer to:

- Shapur of Rey, also known as Sabur al-Razi, Sasanian military officer from the Mihran family, Marzban of Persian Armenia 483–4
- Mihran Razi (died 637), military officer from the Mihran family
- Abu Zur’a al-Razi (died 878), Sunni hadith scholar
- Abu Hatim Muhammad ibn Idris al-Razi (811–890), Sunni hadith scholar
- Muhammad ibn Ya'qub al-Kulayni al-Razi (864–941), Shia compiler of hadith
- Aḥmad ibn Muḥammad ibn Mūsa al-Rāzī (888–955), historian
- ʿĪsā al-Rāzī (died 980), historian
- Najm al-Din Razi, 13th-century Sufi
- Amin Razi, 16th-century geographer

== Locations ==
- Razi University, a public university in the city of Kermanshah
- Razi, Ardabil, a city
- Razi, Golestan, a village
- Razi, Khuzestan, a village
- Razi, West Azerbaijan, a village
- Seyyed Razi, Iran, a village

== Politics ==
- Razi is a short word for a supporter of Rashism

== See also ==
- Raz (disambiguation)
- Raaz (disambiguation)
- Raazi, 2018 Indian spy-thriller film by Meghna Gulzar
  - Raazi (soundtrack), its soundtrack by Shankar–Ehsaan–Loy
