= Razi, Khuzestan =

Razi رضي
- Village
- Location within Iran
- Coordinates: 32°11′00″N 48°15′00″E
- Country: Iran
- Province: Khuzestan
- County: Shush
- Bakhsh: Central
- Rural District: Hoseynabad

Population (2006)
  - Total: 2,066
- Time zone: UTC+3:30 (IRST)
  - Summer (DST): UTC+4:30 (IRDT)

Razi (Persian: رضي, also Romanized as Razī) is a village in Hoseynabad Rural District, in the Central District of Shush County, Khuzestan Province, Iran. At the 2006 census, its population was 2,066, in 362 families.
