= Shahrak-e Bahram =

Village in Khuzestan province, Iran

Shahrak-e Bahram Persian: شهرك بهرام
- Village
- Location within Iran
- Coordinates: 32°19′40″N 48°13′26″E
- Country: Iran
- Province: Khuzestan
- County: Shush
- District: Central
- Rural District: Ben Moala

Population (2016)
  - Total: 2,944
- Time zone: UTC+3:30 (IRST)

Shahrak-e Bahram (Persian: شهرك بهرام) (Note: Also romanized as Shahrak-e Bahrām) is a village in, and the capital of, Ben Moala Rural District of the Central District of Shush County, Khuzestan province, Iran.

== Demographics ==
=== Population ===
At the time of the 2006 National Census, the village's population was 3,320 in 690 households. The following census in 2011 counted 3,239 people in 825 households. The 2016 census measured the population of the village as 2,944 people in 819 households.
