= Khalaf-e Mosallam =

Village in Khuzestan province, Iran

Khalaf-e Mosallam Persian: خلف مسلم
- Village
- Location within Iran
- Coordinates: 32°07′04″N 48°14′29″E
- Country: Iran
- Province: Khuzestan
- County: Shush
- District: Central
- Rural District: Hoseynabad

Population (2016)
  - Total: 1,999
- Time zone: UTC+3:30 (IRST)

Khalaf-e Mosallam (Persian: خلف مسلم) (Note: Also known as Ka‘be Khalaf Moslem and Khalaf Moslem) is a village in Hoseynabad Rural District of the Central District of Shush County, Khuzestan province, Iran.

== Demographics ==
=== Population ===
At the time of the 2006 National Census, the village's population was 1,658 in 209 households. The following census in 2011 counted 1,870 people in 411 households. The 2016 census measured the population of the village as 1,999 people in 510 households. It was the most populous village in its rural district.
