= Qaleh-ye Nasir, Khuzestan =

Qaleh-ye Nasir قلعه نصير
- Village
- Location within Iran
- Coordinates: 32°17′00″N 48°16′00″E
- Country: Iran
- Province: Khuzestan
- County: Shush
- Bakhsh: Central
- Rural District: Ben Moala

Population (2006)
  - Total: 271
- Time zone: UTC+3:30 (IRST)

Qaleh-ye Nasir (Persian: قلعه نصير, also Romanized as Qal‘eh-ye Naşīr; also known as Helāl and Qal‘eh-ye Nāşer) is a village in Ben Moala Rural District, in the Central District of Shush County, Khuzestan Province, Iran. At the 2006 census, its population was 271, in 41 families.
