= Horr, Iran =

City in Khuzestan province, Iran

Horr Persian: حر
- City
- Location within Iran
- Coordinates: 32°08′40″N 48°23′26″E
- Country: Iran
- Province: Khuzestan
- County: Shush
- District: Central

Population (2016)
  - Total: 9,177
- Time zone: UTC+3:30 (IRST)

Horr (Persian: حر) (Note: Also romanized as Ḩorr; also known as Ḩāsheyeh Khalaf, Ḩāshīyeh Khalaf, Ḩāshīyeh Sheykh Khalaf (حاشیه شیخ خلف), Ḩorr-e Reyāḩī, and Ḩorr-e Rīāḩī) is a city in the Central District of Shush County, Khuzestan province, Iran.

== Demographics ==
=== Population ===
At the time of the 2006 National Census, the city population was 7,839 in 1,390 households. The following census in 2011 counted 8,624 people in 2,205 households. The 2016 census measured the population of the city as 9,177 people in 2,513 households.
