= Amaleh-ye Seyf =

Village in Khuzestan province, Iran

Amaleh-ye Seyf Persian: عمله سيف
- Village
- Location within Iran
- Coordinates: 32°13′11″N 48°14′45″E
- Country: Iran
- Province: Khuzestan
- County: Shush
- District: Central
- Rural District: Ben Moala

Population (2016)
  - Total: 4,514
- Time zone: UTC+3:30 (IRST)

Amaleh-ye Seyf (Persian: عمله سيف) (Note: Also romanized as Amaleh Seyf and ‘Amaleh Seyf; also known as ‘Amaleh and Shahīd Dānesh) is a village in Ben Moala Rural District of the Central District of Shush County, Khuzestan province, Iran.

== Demographics ==
=== Population ===
At the time of the 2006 National Census, the village's population was 3,535 in 707 households. The following census in 2011 counted 4,355 people in 1,048 households. The 2016 census measured the population of the village as 4,514 people in 1,277 households. It was the most populous village in its rural district.
