= Green Dome =

Dome in southeast corner of Prophet's Mosque, Medina

- ٱَلْقُبَّة ٱلْخَضْرَاء
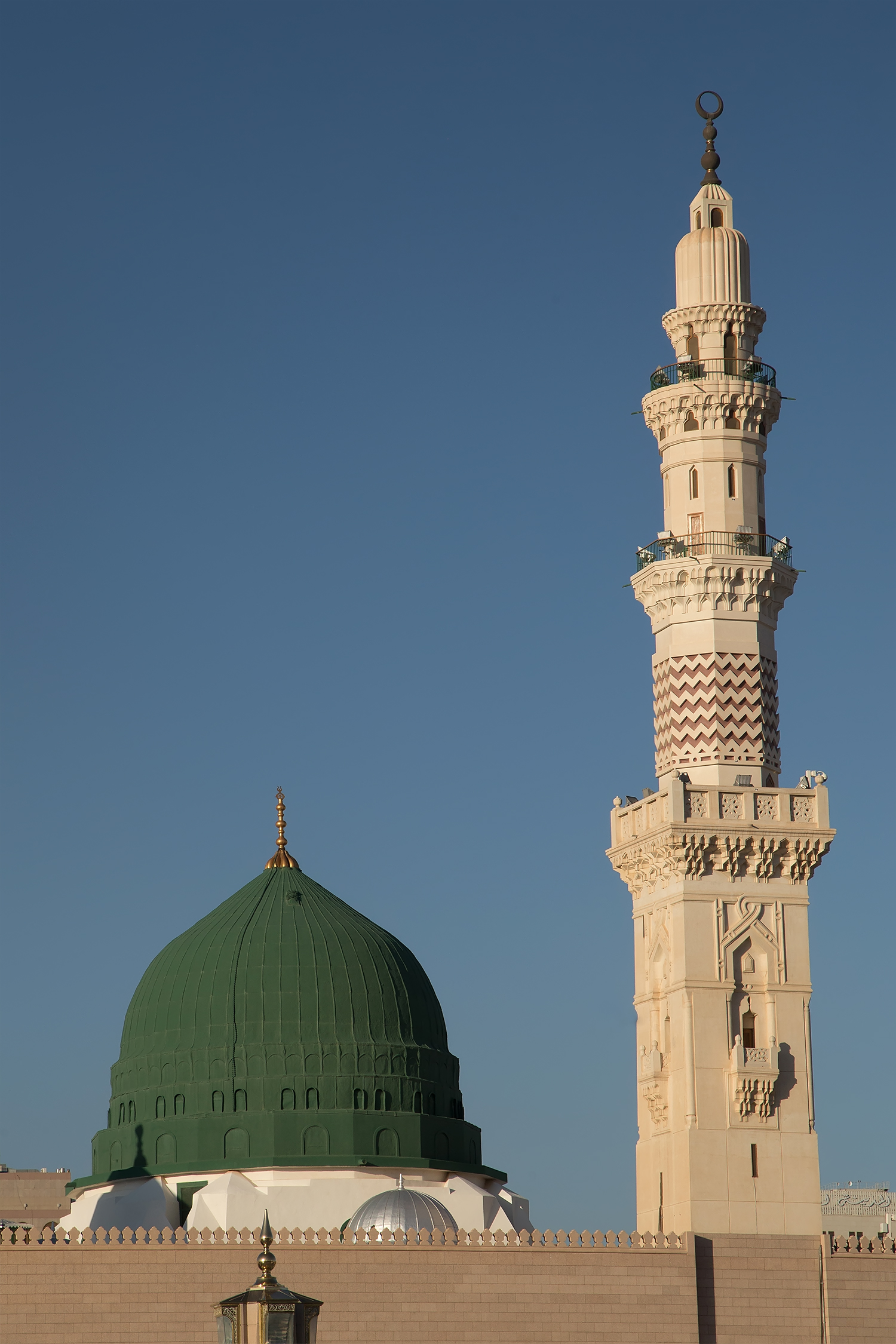
- The Green Dome at the Prophet's Mosque

Religion
- Affiliation: Islam
- Branch/tradition: Ziyarat
- Ecclesiastical or organisational status: Mausoleum

Location
- Location: Al-Masjid an-Nabawi, Medina, Al-Madinah Province, Hejaz
- Country: Saudi Arabia
- Interactive map of Green Dome
- Administration: The Agency of the General Presidency for the Affairs of the Two Holy Mosques
- Coordinates: 24°28′03.22″N 39°36′41.18″E

Architecture
- Type: Tomb
- Style: Islamic
- Founder: Mamluk Sultan Al Mansur Qalawun
- Completed: 678 AH (1279/1280 CE)
- Materials: Wood, brick

The Green Dome (Arabic: ٱَلْقُبَّة ٱلْخَضْرَاء, romanized: al-Qubbah al-Khaḍrāʾ, Hejazi Arabic pronunciation: [al.ɡʊb.ba al.xadˤ.ra]) is a green-coloured dome built above the Sacred Prophetic Chamber (al-Hujra al-Nabawiyya al-Sharifa) enclosing the burial tombs of the Islamic Prophet Muhammad and the first two Rashidun caliphs, Abu Bakr (r. 632–634) and Umar (r. 634–644). The dome was built above Aisha's house, where Muhammad gave his last breath and was buried. It is located in the southeast corner of the Prophet’s Mosque (al-Masjid al-Nabawi) in Medina, present-day Saudi Arabia. Millions visit it every year, since it is a tradition to visit the mosque after or before the pilgrimage to Mecca.

The structure dates from 678 AH (1279/1280 CE), when an unpainted wooden cupola was built over the tomb. It was later rebuilt and painted using different colours (blue and silver) twice in the late 15th century and once in 1817 AD. The dome was first painted green in 1837 AD, and hence became known as the "Green Dome".

== History ==
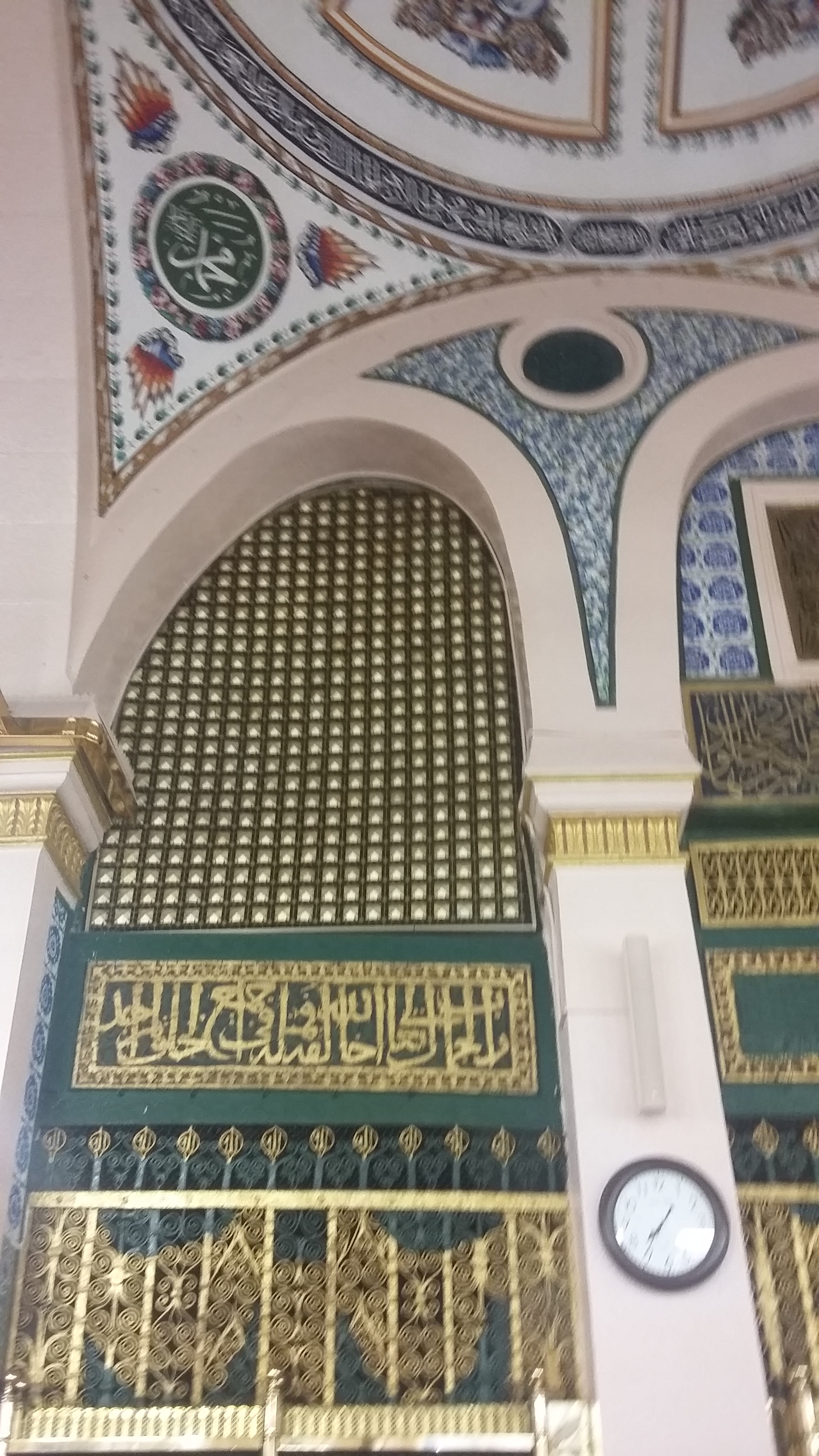
Wall of the Burial

Built in 678 AH (1279/1280 CE), during the reign of Mamluk Sultan Al Mansur Qalawun, the original structure was made out of wood and was colourless, painted white and blue in later restorations. After a serious fire struck the mosque in 1481 CE, the mosque and dome were burnt, and a restoration project was initiated by Sultan Qaitbay, who had most of the wooden base replaced by a brick structure in order to prevent the collapse of the dome in the future, and used plates of lead to cover the new wooden dome. The building, including the Tomb of the Prophet, was extensively renewed through Qaitbay's patronage. The current dome was added in 1818 CE by the Ottoman Sultan Mahmud II. The dome was first painted green in 1837 CE.

When Saud bin Abdul-Aziz took Medina in 1805 CE, his followers, the Wahhabis, demolished nearly every tomb dome in Medina based on their belief that the veneration of graves and places claimed to possess supernatural powers is an offense against the oneness of God (tawhid) and supposedly associates partners with Him (shirk). The tomb was stripped of its gold and jewel ornaments, but the dome was preserved either because of an unsuccessful attempt to demolish its hardened structure, or because some time ago Ibn Abd al-Wahhab wrote that he did not wish to see the dome destroyed despite his aversion to people praying at the tomb. Similar events took place in 1925 when the Saudi militias retook—and this time managed to keep—the city.

== Tomb of Muhammad and early caliphs ==
Muhammad's grave lies within the confines of what used to be his and his wife Aisha's house during the Hijra. During his lifetime, it adjoined the mosque. The first and second Rashidun Caliphs, Abu Bakr and Umar, are buried next to where Muhammad is buried. Umar was given a spot next to Abu Bakr by Aisha, originally intended for her. A spot is available behind Prophet Muhammed’s grave, which according to narrations is reserved for Jesus Christ upon his Second Coming. The mosque was expanded during the reign of Umayyad Caliph al-Walid I to include their tombs. The graves themselves cannot be seen.

The graves and what remains of Aisha's house are enclosed by a 5-sided wall, without doors or windows, built by the caliph Umar ibn Abd al-Aziz. The irregular pentagon shape was chosen deliberately, to make it look different from the rectangular Kaaba, and to discourage people from performing tawaf around it. The enclosure has been inaccessible since Mamluk Sultan Qaitbay's reconstruction of 1481. Only the outer southern wall, draped in green cloth, can be seen through the grilles built several centuries later.

== Opposition to the dome ==
Since its emergence in the eighteenth century, Salafism has opposed the construction of domes over graves. In 1925, forces of the Salafi-Wahhabi House of Saud demolished all of the domes built over the graves of the Companions of the Prophet and the Ahl al-Bayt in al-Baqi', the second such demolition to occur. Salafism has also called for the demolition of the Green Dome and the rebuilding of the Prophet's Mosque as it was in the era of the Prophet, so that the Prophet's grave, which is in the room of Lady Aisha, is not part of the mosque. Muqbil al-Wadi'i says: "After this, I do not think you would hesitate that Muslims must restore the Prophet's Mosque as it was in the era of the Prophet, on the eastern side, so that the grave is not included within the mosque, and that they must remove that dome that many grave-worshippers now use as evidence... It is fitting for us, Muslims, to take on those domes built over graves and uproot them from the earth.

Saleh bin Muqbil al-Usaymi said: "The persistence of this dome over eight centuries does not mean that it has become permissible, nor does it mean that silence about it is an endorsement of it or evidence of its permissibility. Rather, it is incumbent upon the rulers of the Muslims to remove it, restore the situation to what it was during the era of the Prophet, and remove the dome, the decorations, and the inscriptions from the mosques, especially the Prophet's Mosque, unless doing so would result in a greater tribulation. If it does result in a greater tribulation, then it is incumbent upon the ruler to wait and be determined to seize the opportunity whenever it arises."

== Panorama ==
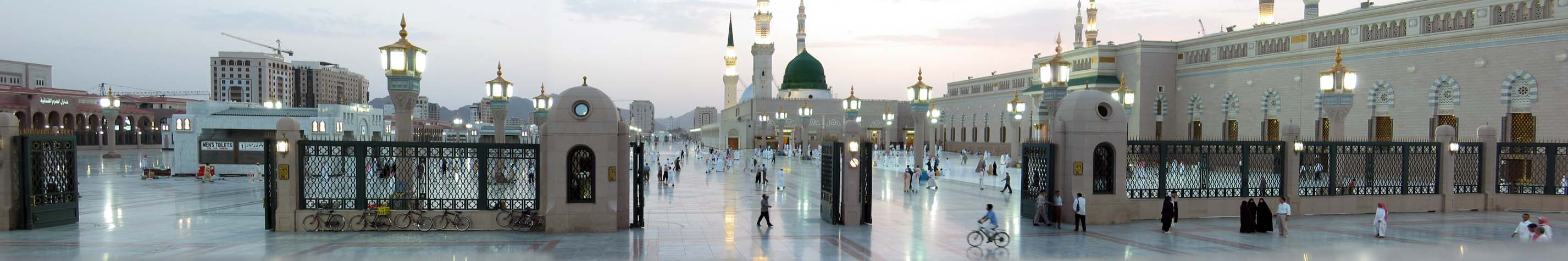
Green Dome and Prophet's Mosque at sunset, view from the east

== Gallery ==
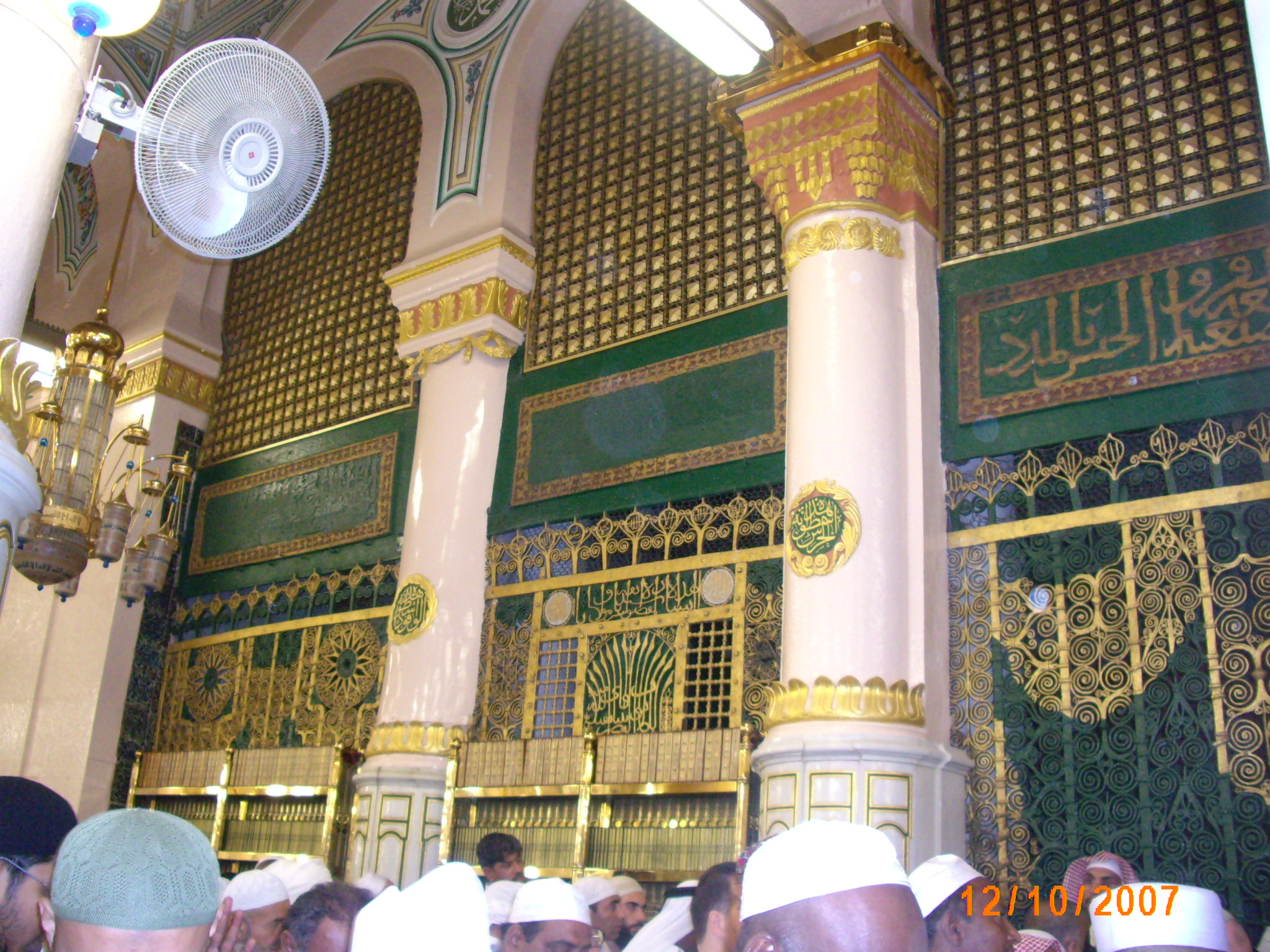
View from the western side of the Hujra

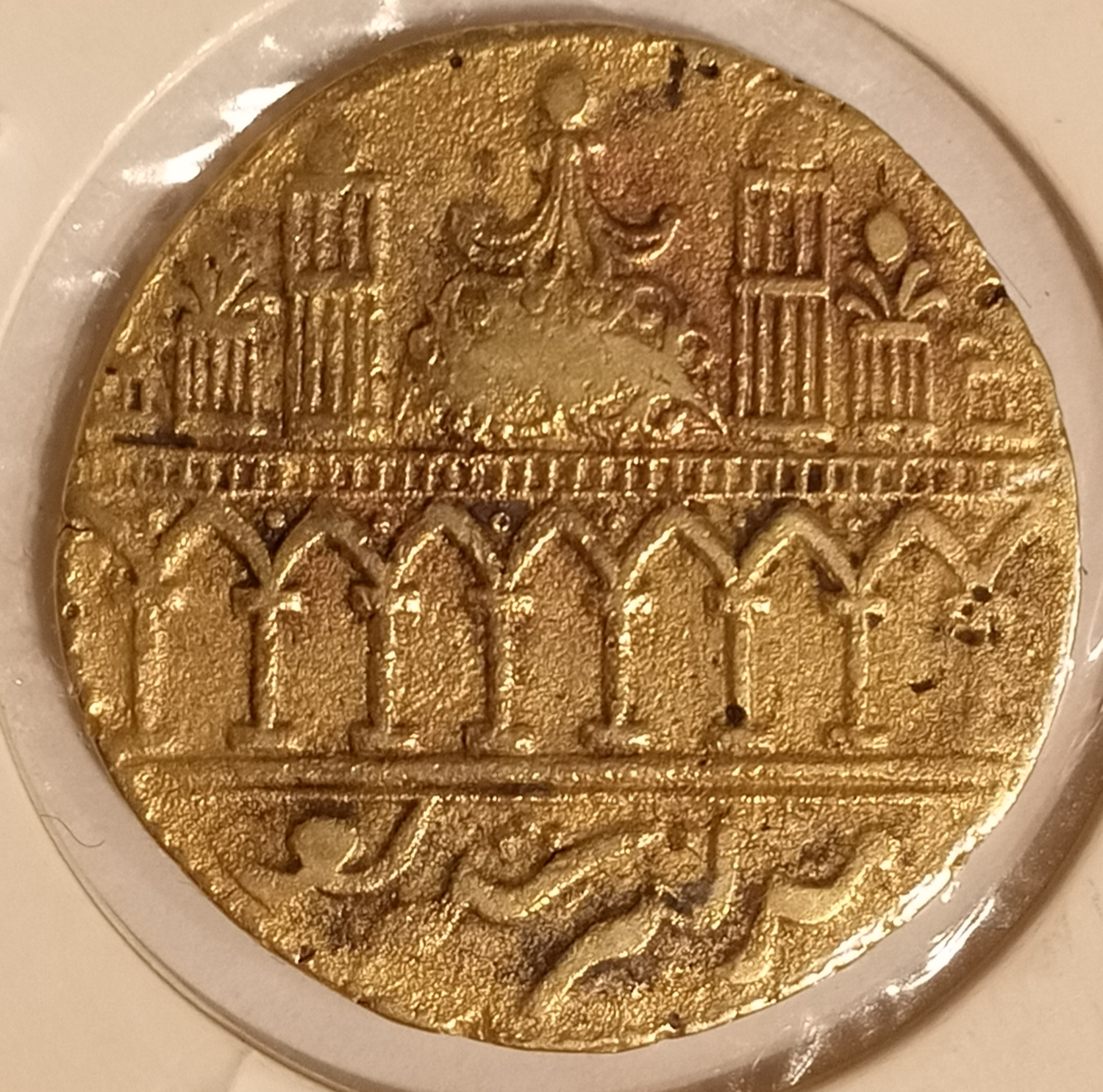
17th century bronze coin depicting Mamluk era dome which preceded the current dome

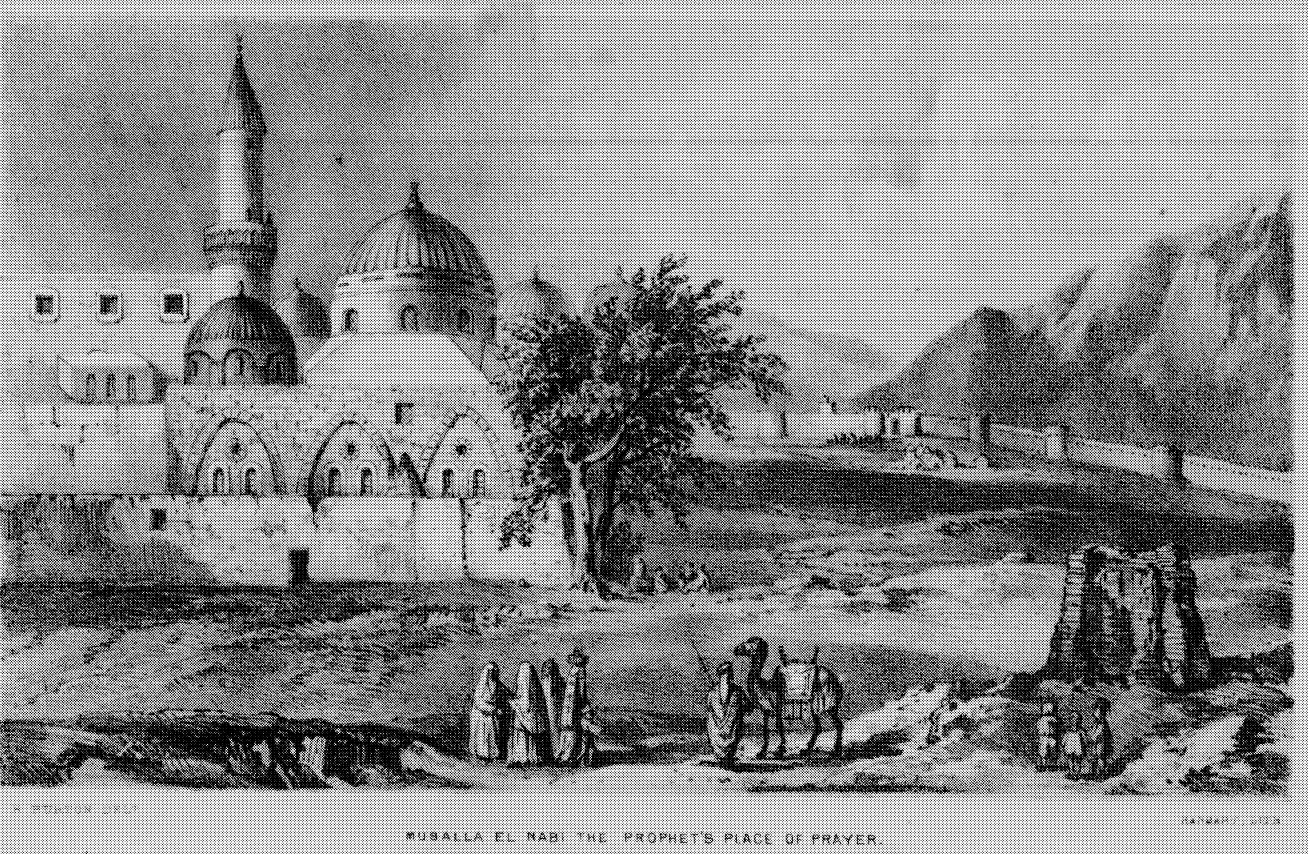
The Green Dome, in Burton's Pilgrimage, c. 1850 CE

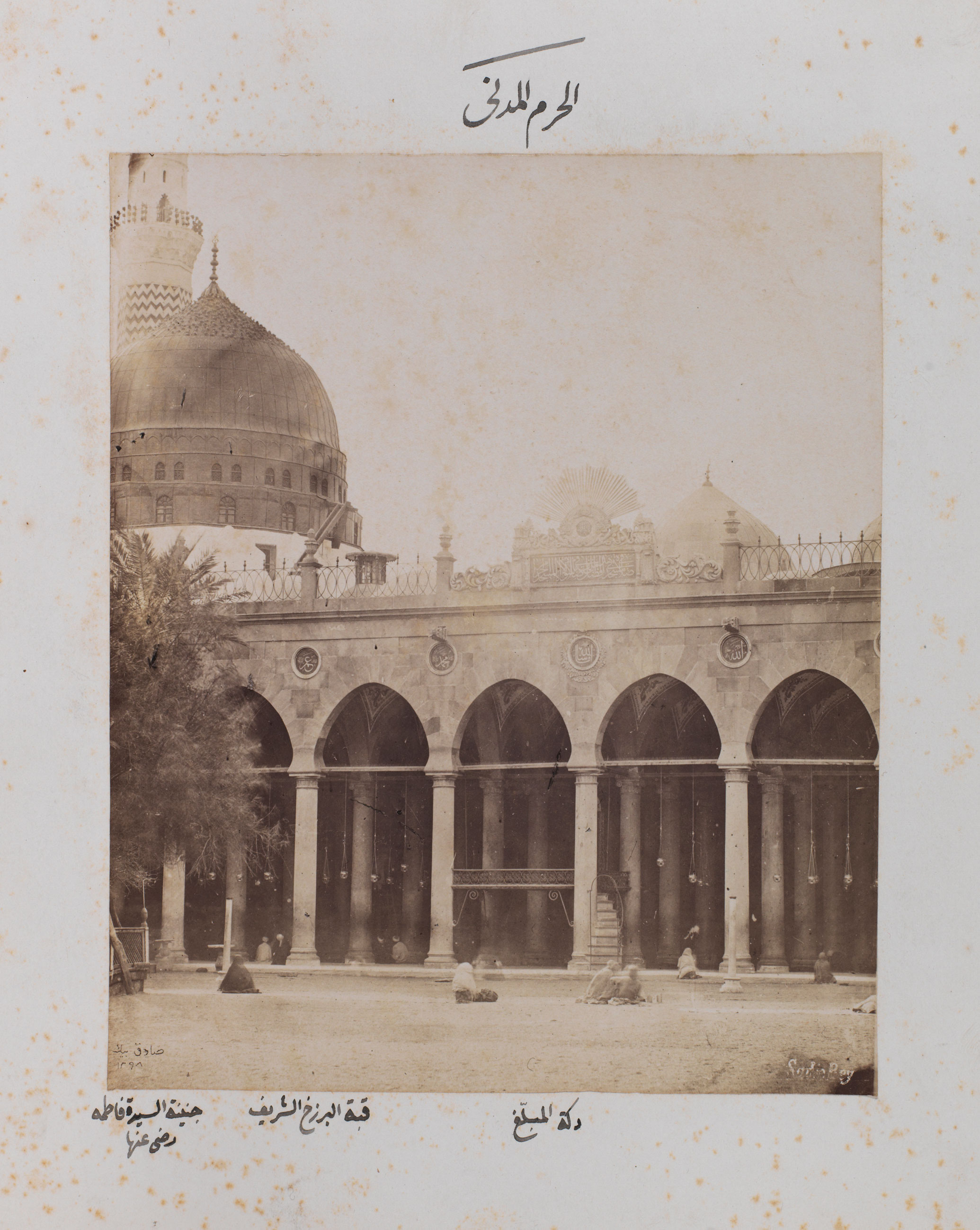
The Dome, first photographed in 1880 by Muhammad Sadiq

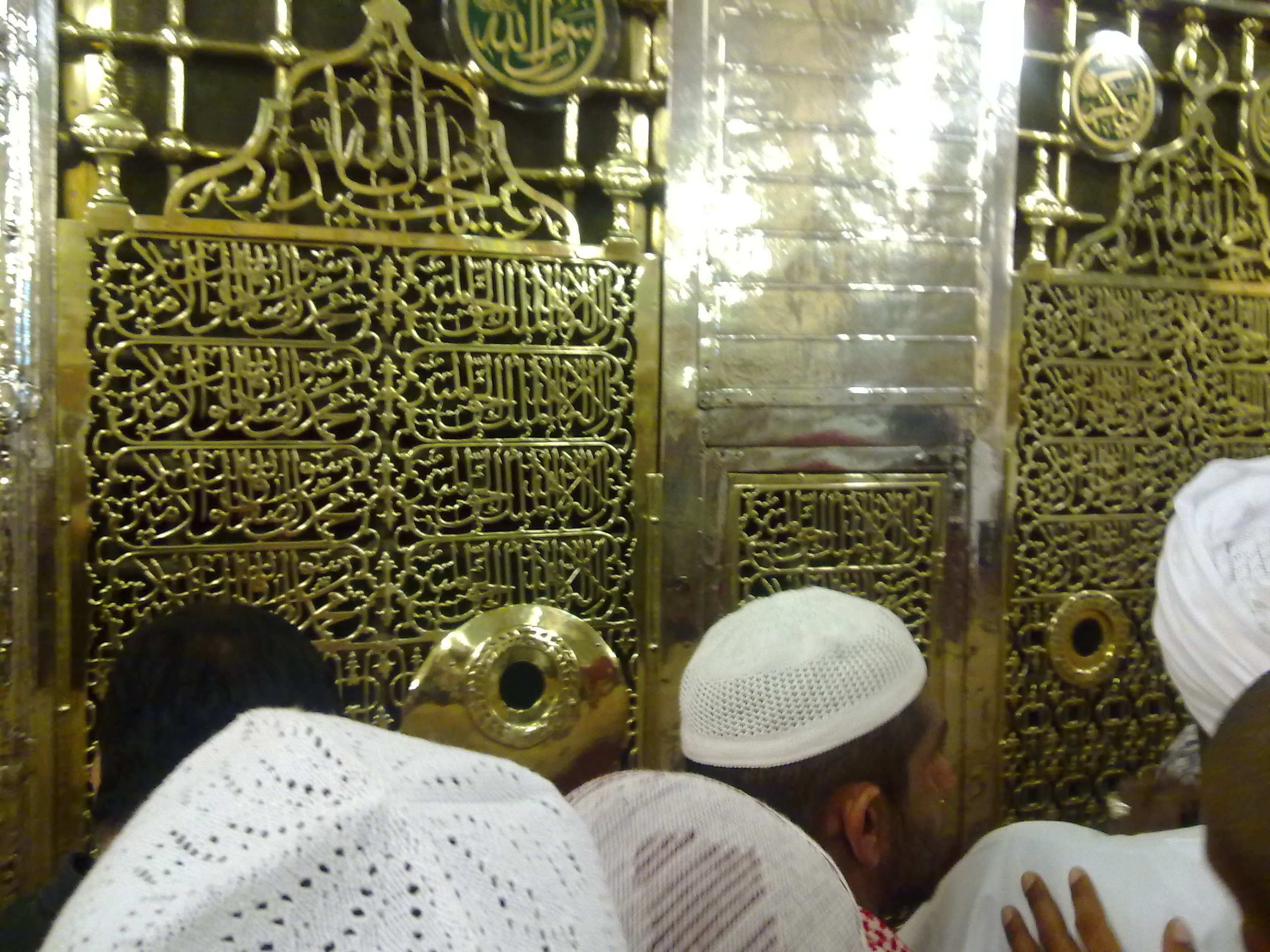
The grave of Muhammad located inside the quarter seen here

== See also ==
- Bayt al-Mawlid, the house where Muhammad was born
- Burial places of founders of world religions
- Destruction of early Islamic heritage sites in Saudi Arabia
- List of mausoleums in Saudi Arabia
- List of mosques in Saudi Arabia
- An-Nasr Mosque
- Mausoleum of Qin Shi Huang
- List of burials in the Valley of the Kings
- List of burial places of Abrahamic figures
- Symbolism of domes
