= Amaleh-ye Teymur =

Neighborhood in Khuzestan province, Iran

Amaleh-ye Teymur Persian: عمله تيمور
- Neighborhood
- Location within Iran
- Coordinates: 32°10′50″N 48°16′40″E
- Country: Iran
- Province: Khuzestan
- County: Shush
- District: Central
- City: Shush

Population (2011)
  - Total: 9,272
- Time zone: UTC+3:30 (IRST)

Amaleh-ye Teymur (Persian: عمله تيمور) (Note: Also romanized as ‘Amaleh Teymūr, ‘Amaleh-ye Teymūr, and ‘Omleh Teymūr; also known as Abūz̄ar-e Ghaffārī) is a neighborhood in the city of Shush. As a village, it was the capital of, Hoseynabad Rural District of the Central District of Shush County, Khuzestan province, Iran. The previous capital of the rural district was the village of Hashiyeh Sheykh Khalaf.

== Demographics ==
=== Population ===
At the time of the 2006 National Census, Amaleh-ye Teymur's population was 8,493 in 1,653 households, when it was a village in Hoseynabad Rural District. The following census in 2011 counted 9,272 people in 2,249 households. After the census, the village was absorbed by the city of Shush.
