= Makkah Al Mukarramah Library =

Building on spot where Muhammad was born

Makkah Al Mukarramah Library (House of the Birth)
- Arabic: مَكْتَبَة مَكَّة ٱلْمُكَرَّمَة, romanized: Maktabat Makkah Al-Mukarramah (Arabic: بَيْت ٱلْمَوْلِد, romanized: Bayt al-Mawlid)
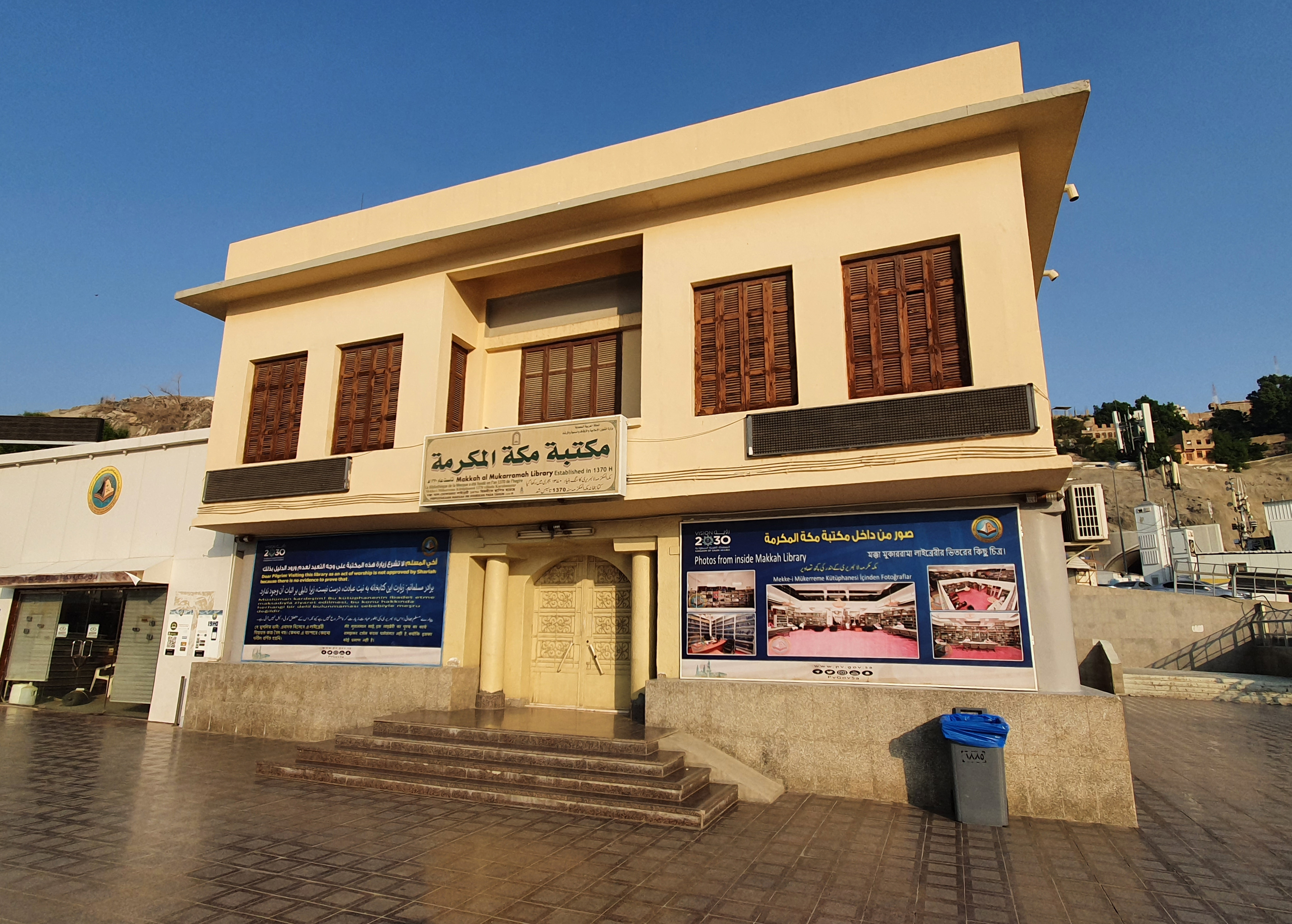
- The library which stands on the spot where Muhammad is believed to have been born
- 21°25′30″N 39°49′48″E
- Location: Near Al-Masjid al-Haram, Makkah, Makkah Province, Hejaz, Saudi Arabia
- Type: Islamic library
- Scope: Islam (Ziyarat)
- Reference to legal mandate: Saudi King 'Abdul-'Aziz bin 'Abdul-Rahman Al Saud

Other information
- Parent organization: Al Saud

The Makkah Al Mukarramah Library (Arabic: مَكْتَبَة مَكَّة ٱلْمُكَرَّمَة, romanized: Maktabah Makkah Al-Mukarramah) is a library near the Masjid al-Haram in Mecca, Saudi Arabia. Since it is believed to stand on the spot where the Islamic prophet Muhammad was born, it was also previously known as the Bayt al-Mawlid (Arabic: بَيْت ٱلْمَوْلِد, lit. 'House of the Birth').

== History ==
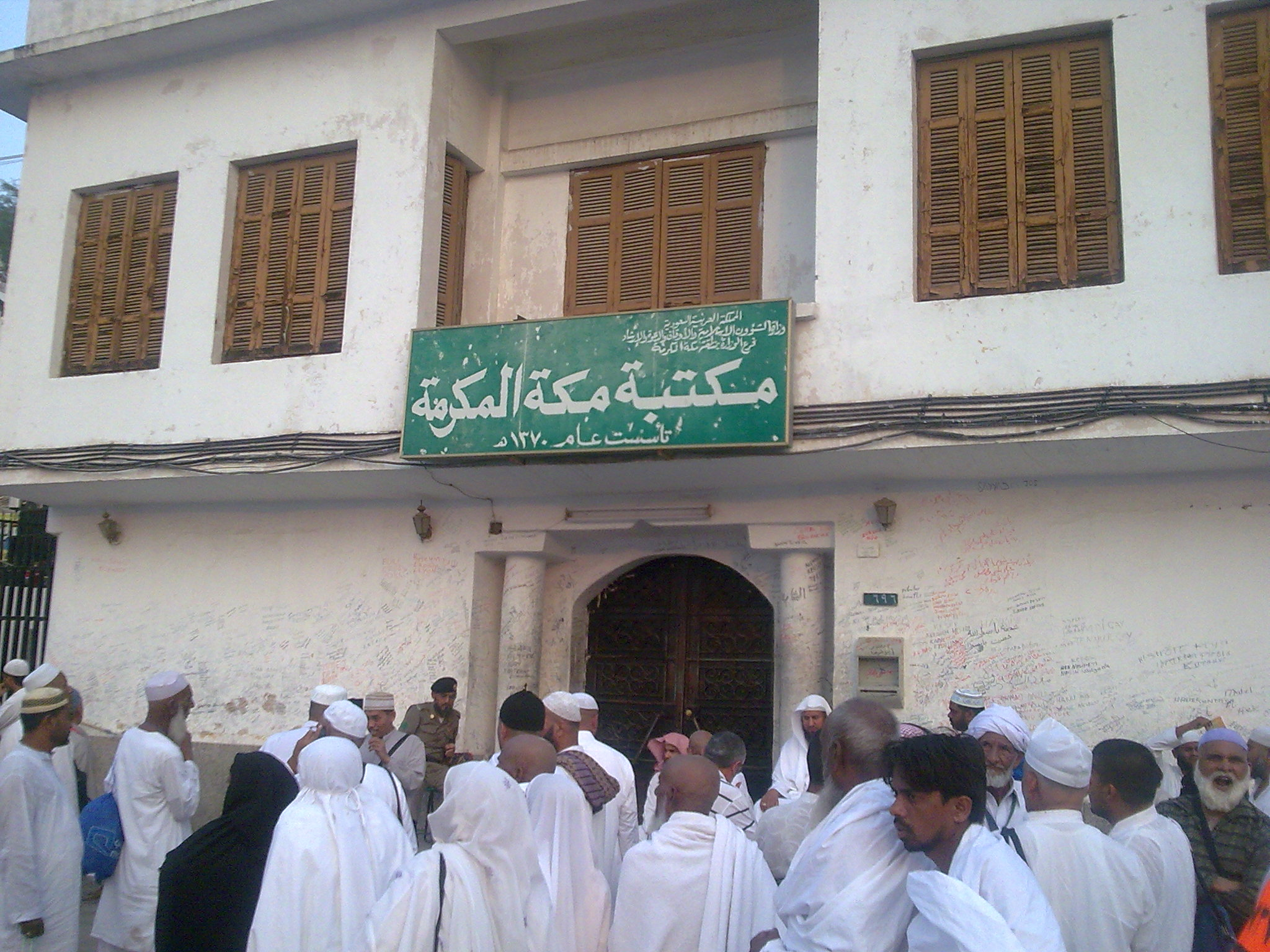
Muslims visiting the building in November 2008

=== Islamic ===
Amina bint Wahb is believed to have given birth to Muhammad in the month of Rabi' al-Awwal, circa 53 B.H. or 570 C.E. Her husband, Abdullah ibn Abd al-Muttalib, had died three to six months prior.

=== Modern ===
After consulting senior scholars, ibn Saud, the founding king of Saudi Arabia, built this library over the site of Muhammad's birth.

== See also ==
- Church of the Nativity, birthplace of 'Isa (Jesus)
- Family tree of Muhammad
- The Green Dome over the tomb of Muhammad
