= Amaleh-ye Sofla =

Amaleh-ye Sofla عمله سفلي
- Village
- Location within Iran
- Coordinates: 34°30′19″N 47°01′36″E
- Country: Iran
- Province: Kermanshah
- County: Kermanshah
- Bakhsh: Central
- Rural District: Miyan Darband

Population (2006)
  - Total: 38
- Time zone: UTC+3:30 (IRST)
  - Summer (DST): UTC+4:30 (IRDT)

Amaleh-ye Sofla (Persian: عمله سفلي, also Romanized as ‘Amaleh-ye Soflá; also known as ‘Amaleh-ye Pā'īn) is a village in Miyan Darband Rural District, in the Central District of Kermanshah County, Kermanshah Province, Iran. At the 2006 census, its population was 38, in 9 families.
