= Islamic libraries =

Islamic libraries are libraries associated with Islam and Islamic history. An essential term for Islam, the first word in the Quran is Iqra. This term simply means 'read', as Muslims are encouraged, through the influence of Muhammad, to devote their lives to the pursuit of knowledge at all times. The Quran uses repetition in its text to emphasize concepts and values to those who follow it. Not only does this assist with the memorization of the text, but also reiterates the importance of its values. For example, the word Ilm, meaning knowledge, is repeated 750 times.

== Early decades of Islamic libraries ==
Mosques were the center of many intellectual pursuits, becoming a nexus for educational, political, and religious activities. Also housed at the mosques were books on religion, philosophy, and science that were written, studied, and annotated by Muslim scholars and scientists from different scientific backgrounds. Due to this, hundreds of works were produced, some by one scholar alone. Ibn Hazm, for example, wrote about 400 volumes, totaling 80,000 pages. This eventually led to libraries being the "main educational centers for Muslims", emphasizing subjects such as natural philosophy, science, and mathematics. The collection of works led to the creation of libraries in the homes of scholars as well as the wealthy.

== Abbasid dynasty ==
Caliph al-Rashid of the Abbasid Caliphate established one of the first libraries during his reign. The Abbasid dynasty assumed the caliphate after the Umayyad dynasty in 750 CE, and it plays a crucial role in the development of Muslim scientific and philosophical study. Caliph al-Rashid had classic Greek works translated into Arabic, whose influence led to the Renaissance later in Europe.

The Bayt al-Hikmah, also known as the House of Wisdom, was built in Baghdad by the Caliph al-Rashid (786–809 CE) during the Islamic Golden Age and was used as a meeting place for scholars. In this library, advances of knowledge in subjects such as geography, astronomy, and mathematics were made. Notable scholars of this time include Ibn Miskawayah, and translators Ibn Naubakht and Humayun Ibn Ishaq, whose responsibilities included organizing and maintaining libraries. Eventually, The House of Wisdom became one of the largest book repositories, and "became the leading center for various branches of study, including mathematics, astronomy, medicine, alchemy, chemistry, zoology, geography, and cartography". Caliph al-Mamun eventually added other centers, as well as an observatory in 839 CE to expand research opportunities for scholars which influenced the creation of paper that was originally discovered by the Chinese. Through the development and expansion of the House of Wisdom, as well as the newly invented material of paper, similar libraries were established in major Muslim cities, such as Cairo and Aleppo. Paper mills were built and public libraries were established, including lending libraries. Eventually most Islamic institutions by the 10th century included libraries which were used by students and readers.

== See also ==
- Islamic studies
- Special libraries
- List of libraries in Iran
