= Ben Moala Rural District =

Rural district in Khuzestan province, Iran

Ben Moala Rural District Persian: دهستان بن معلي
- Rural District
- Location within Iran
- Coordinates: 32°16′53″N 48°13′17″E
- Country: Iran
- Province: Khuzestan
- County: Shush
- District: Central
- Capital: Shahrak-e Bahram

Population (2016)
  - Total: 10,188
- Time zone: UTC+3:30 (IRST)

Ben Moala Rural District (Persian: دهستان بن معلي) is in the Central District of Shush County, Khuzestan province, Iran. Its capital is the village of Shahrak-e Bahram.

== Demographics ==
=== Population ===
At the time of the 2006 National Census, the rural district's population was 9,231 in 1,796 households. There were 10,217 inhabitants in 2,418 households at the following census of 2011. The 2016 census measured the population of the rural district as 10,188 in 2,773 households. The most populous of its 24 villages was Amaleh-ye Seyf, with 4,514 people.
