= Hoseynabad Rural District (Shush County) =

Rural district in Khuzestan province, Iran

Hoseynabad Rural District Persian: دهستان حسين آباد
- Rural District
- Location within Iran
- Coordinates: 32°06′52″N 48°24′27″E
- Country: Iran
- Province: Khuzestan
- County: Shush
- District: Central

Population (2016)
  - Total: 22,946
- Time zone: UTC+3:30 (IRST)

Hoseynabad Rural District (Persian: دهستان حسين آباد) is in the Central District of Shush County, Khuzestan province, Iran. Its capital was the village of Amaleh-ye Teymur. The previous capital of the rural district was the village of Hashiyeh Sheykh Khalaf.

== Demographics ==
=== Population ===
At the time of the 2006 National Census, the rural district's population was 42,074 in 7,522 households. There were 39,439 inhabitants in 9,339 households at the following census of 2011. The 2016 census measured the population of the rural district as 22,946 in 6,043 households. The most populous of its 49 villages was Khalaf-e Mosallam, with 1,999 people.
