= Central District (Shush County) =

District in Khuzestan province, Iran

Central District (Shush County) Persian: بخش مرکزی شهرستان شوش
- District
- Location within Iran
- Coordinates: 32°09′25″N 48°22′52″E
- Country: Iran
- Province: Khuzestan
- County: Shush
- Capital: Shush

Population (2016)
  - Total: 119,459
- Time zone: UTC+3:30 (IRST)

The Central District of Shush County (Persian: بخش مرکزی شهرستان شوش) is in Khuzestan province, Iran. Its capital is the city of Shush.

== Demographics ==
=== Population ===
At the time of the 2006 National Census, the district's population was 113,041 in 21,397 households. The following census in 2011 counted 117,441 people in 28,525 households. The 2016 census measured the population of the district as 119,459 inhabitants in 32,978 households.

=== Administrative divisions ===
Central District (Shush County) Population
Administrative Divisions	2006	2011	2016
Ben Moala RD	9,231	10,217	10,188
Hoseynabad RD	42,074	39,439	22,946
Horr (city)	7,839	8,624	9,177
Shush (city)	53,897	59,161	77,148
Total	113,041	117,441	119,459
RD = Rural District
