= 2014 Afghan presidential election =

- 5 April 2014 (first round); 14 June 2014 (second round)
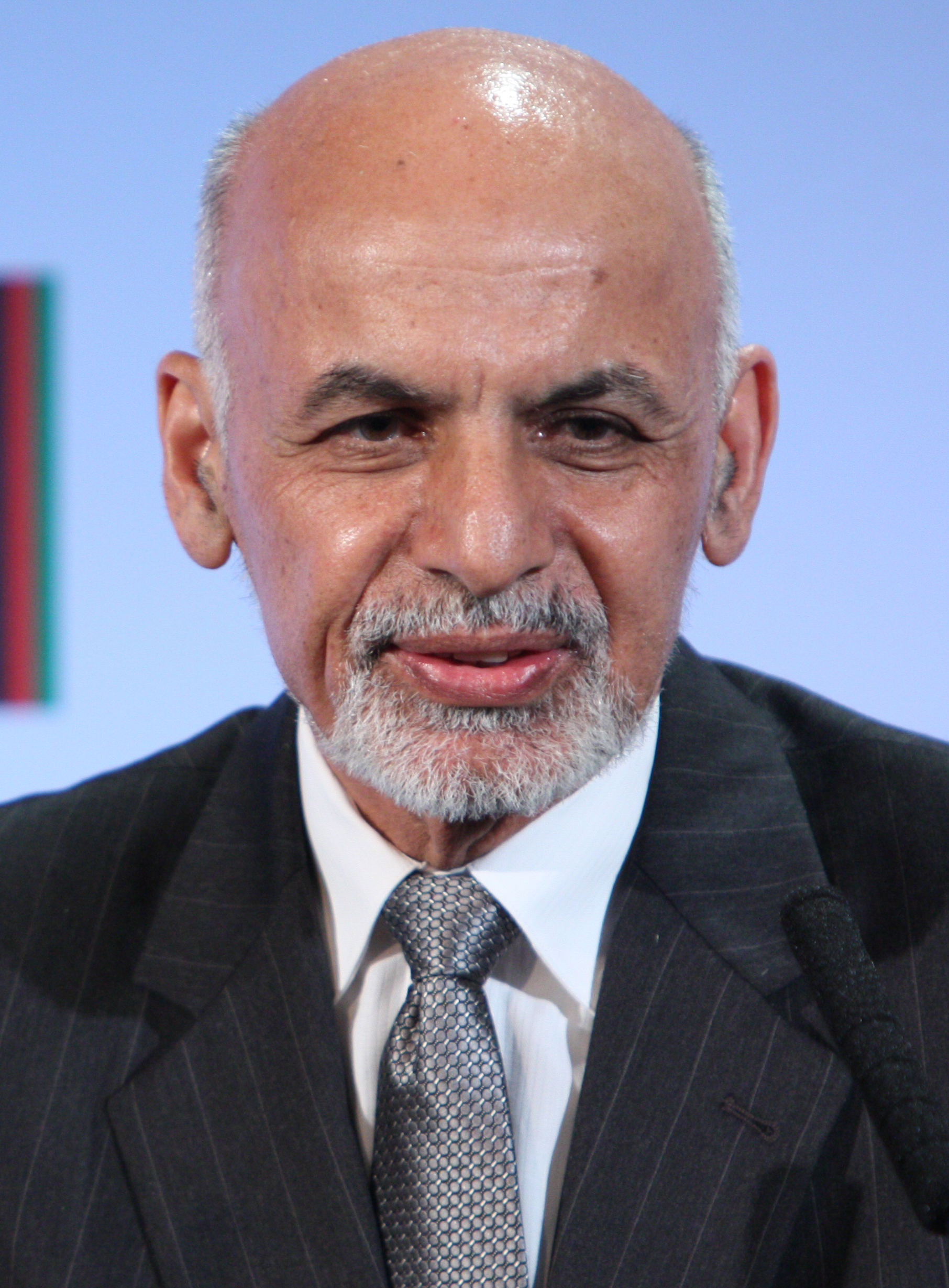

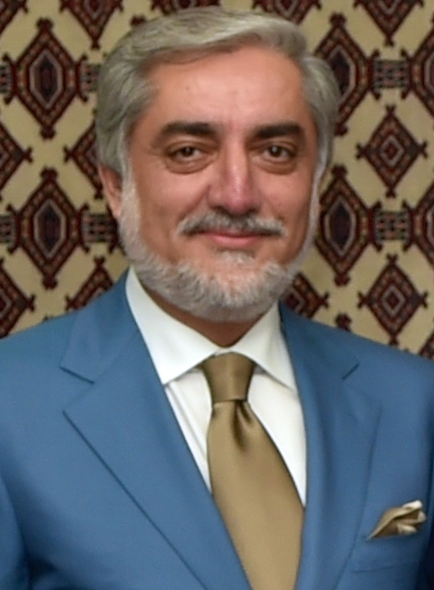
Nominee	Ashraf Ghani	Abdullah Abdullah
Party	Independent	National Coalition
Running mate	Abdul Rashid Dostum; Sarwar Danish	Mohammad Khan; Mohammad Mohaqiq
Popular vote	3,935,567	3,185,018
Percentage	55.27%	44.73%
Results by province
Ghani
50–60%
60–70%
70–80%
80–90%
90-100%
Abdullah
50–60%
60–70%
70–80%
80–90%
90-100%
President before election
Hamid Karzai
Independent
Elected President
Ashraf Ghani
Independent

Presidential elections were held in Afghanistan on 5 April 2014, with a second round held on 14 June. Incumbent President Hamid Karzai was not eligible to run due to term limits. The registration period for presidential nominations was open from 16 September 2013 until 6 October 2013. A total of 27 candidates were confirmed to be running for office. However, on 22 October Afghanistan's Independent Election Commission disqualified 16 of the candidates, leaving only 11 in the race.

By April 2014, three candidates gave up the race and decided to support some of the eight remaining candidates. Opinion polls showed Abdullah Abdullah and Ashraf Ghani as the front-runners and results of the first round of the election had Abdullah in the lead and Ghani behind him. The second set of results came after the run-off on 14 June, two months after the first round. Preliminary results were expected on 2 July and the final result on 22 July. However, widespread accusations of fraud delayed these results. As a result, John Kerry, then United States Secretary of State, mediated the negotiations between the two final candidates, Ghani and Abdullah.

After a series of negotiations and talks between Ghani, Abdullah and Kerry, the two candidates agreed to sign an Agreement to form a National Unity Government, with both sharing power. As a result of the agreement, a separate position was created for Abdullah, being Chief Executive. The National Unity Government's term ended with the 2019 Afghan presidential election.

The election was the first and only time in Afghanistan's history that power was transferred through democratic means.

== Procedure ==
On 17 July 2013, the Parliament of Afghanistan passed a pair of election laws considered crucial to holding the election on time; President Karzai signed one and was expected to sign the other quickly. The first law to be signed laid out the composition and rules for Afghanistan's election commission and a separate commission to adjudicate complaints about voter fraud and other irregularities. The other one governed how the vote will be held.

Pakistan sealed its border with Afghanistan during the electoral period in order to reduce the chances of cross-border attacks.

There have been reports of polling sites running out of ballot papers due to a high turnout.

== Candidates ==
A total of 27 candidates were confirmed to have submitted their nominations by Afghanistan's Independent Election Commission on 6 October 2013, the closing day of the nomination period.

- Ashraf Ghani, former Minister of Finance
- Dil Agha Kohdamani
- Ishaq Gailani
- Hashmat Ghani Ahmadzai
- Qutbuddin Hilal
- Qayum Karzai, brother of current President Hamid Karzai, businessman and politician
- Fazil Karim Najmi
- Zalmai Rassoul, former Minister of Foreign Affairs
- Abdul Rasul Sayyaf
- Bismillah Sher, leader of the Wefaq Millie Party
- Abdul Rahim Wardak, former Minister of Defense
- Abdullah Abdullah, former Minister of Foreign Affairs, leader of National Coalition of Afghanistan, presidential candidate in 2009

However, on 22 October Afghanistan's Independent Election Commission disqualified 16 of the candidates, leaving only 11 in the race. The different candidates were disqualified for a number of reasons, among them were education levels, documentation and the number of required signatures. The disqualified candidates had 20 days to appeal the decision and the Independent Election Commission was due to present the final list of confirmed candidates on 19 November 2013.

On 25 November 2013, the Independent Election Commission announced the ordering of the candidate names for the election ballot as follows:

Candidate	Running mate	Coalition	Occupation	Political spectrum
Abdullah Abdullah; National Coalition	Mohammad Khan; Hezbi Islami; Mohammad Mohaqiq; Hizb-e Wahdat Islami Mardum-e Afghanistan	"National Coalition of Afghanistan" (National Front, Jamiat-e Islami, NUPA) Supported by (Hezbi Islami, Hizb-e Wahdat Islami Mardum-e Afghanistan, Yunus Qanuni, Atta Muhammad Nur)	Politician. Former Foreign Minister.	Islamic democracy, Reform
Ashraf Ghani; Independent	Abdul Rashid Dostum; National Islamic Movement; Sarwar Danish; Hizb-e Wahdat Islami Afghanistan	None; Supported by (National Solidarity Party of Afghanistan, Afghan Mellat, National Islamic Front, Sayed Mansoor Naderi, Milli Nijat Party),)	Politician. Former Finance Minister.	Reform; Pro-BSA
Zalmai Rassoul; Independent	Ahmad Zia Massoud; Jamiat-e Islami; Habiba Sarobi; Truth and Justice	None; Supported by (Qayum Karzai, Abdul Rahim Wardak, Sardar Mohammad Nadir Naeem, Hezb-e-Islami Shura Alliance, Hezbi Islami of Waheedullah Sabaoon)	Politician. Former Foreign Minister.	Centrism
Abdul Rasul Sayyaf; Islamic Dawa	Mohammad Ismail Khan; Jamiat-e Islami; Abdul Wahab Urfan Erfan; Independent	—	Politician.	Wahhabi Islamism
Gul Agha Sherzai; Independent	Sayed Hussain Alimi Balkhi; Independent; Mohammad Hashim Zare; Independent	—	Politician. Former Governor of Nangarhar.	
Qutbuddin Hilal; Independent	Enayatullah Enayat; Independent; Mohammad Ali Nabizada; Independent	None; Supported by (Hezb-e Islami Gulbuddin)	Politician. Former Deputy Prime Minister. Former member of Hezbi Islami.	Conservative Islamism
Mohammad Daud Sultanzoy; Independent	Ahmad Saeedi; Independent; Kazima Mohaqiq; Independent	—	Politician.	
Hidayat Amin Arsala; Independent	Gen. Khudaidad; Independent; Safia Seddiqi; Independent	—	Politician, Economist, Former Finance and Foreign Minister.	
Withdrawn Candidates
Qayum Karzai; Independent	Wahidullah Shahrani; Independent; Ibrahim Qasmi; Independent	Withdrew and supported Rassoul	Politician & Businessman.	Reform; Pro-Western
Abdul Rahim Wardak; Independent	Shah Abdul Ahad Afzali; Independent; Sayed Hussein Anwari; Islamic Movement	Withdrew and supported Rassoul	Politician. Former Minister of Defence.	
Sardar Mohammad Nadir Naeem; Independent	Taj Mohammad Akbar; Independent; Azizullah Puya; Independent	Withdrew and supported Rassoul	Secretary to former King of Afghanistan.	

=== Declined to run ===
- Sarwar Ahmedzai
- Mohammad Hanif Atmar
- Ali Ahmad Jalali
- Zalmay Khalilzad
- Fawzia Koofi
- Mohammad Mohaqiq
- Atta Muhammad Nur
- Mohammad Yunos Qanuni
- Ghulam Farooq Wardak
- Mirwais Yasini

== Campaign ==
On 6 March 2014 Qayum Karzai ended his bid for the presidency, and instead announced his support for Zalmai Rassoul. Due to the lateness of his announcement Karzai's name still appeared on the ballot paper; however, Karzai told supporters to vote for Rassoul instead. Two other candidates – Sardar Mohammad Nadir Naeem and Abdul Rahim Wardak – did the same thing to create a strong Pashtun ticket.

=== Debates ===
Afghanistan's TOLOnews hosted several debates between the presidential candidates.

==== First debate ====
The first debate took place on 4 February 2014 and included five candidates: Abdullah Abdullah, Qayoum Karzai, Ashraf Ghani Ahmadzai, Zalmai Rassoul, and Abdul Rahmi Wardak. The debate focused on the issues of security, the economy, and corruption.

==== Second debate ====
The second debate took place on 18 February 2014 and included four candidates: Daoud Sultanzoy, Mohammad Nader Naeem, Hedayat Amin Arsala, and Qotbuddin Helal. As with the first debate, the second debate focused on the issues of security, the economy, and corruption.

On the issue of security Arsala emphasised the need for better cooperation between the various Afghan security agencies. Sultanzoy focused on the issue of a lack of motivation and high desertions in the Afghan security forces. Naeem emphasised the need to combat insecurity by providing better services.

On the issue of peace negotiations with the Taliban Naeem argued that certain parts of the Taliban want peace and could be compromised with. Sultanzoy argued that the Taliban was a tool of foreign intelligence agencies, and that in order to marginalize the Taliban the Afghan people needed to unite behind a unifying goal. Hilal argued that the Taliban was a diverse group, with certain members being driven by poverty, whilst others were "agents of intelligence agencies." Hilal argued that the former parts could and should be negotiated with. Arsala argued that if the Taliban embraced politics, instead of violence, that they could be given a "chair in the cabinet."

Sultanzoy also argued that corruption was resulting in poverty, and that increases in pensions and salaries could be afforded through a reduction in corruption. Arsala also focused on the issue of corruption, arguing that "government administration overall must be reformed." Hilal advocated reducing corruption through a mixture of better policing and the digitizing of government records. Naeem argued that corruption was a major issue for the Afghan bureaucracy, and had increased over the past 12 years. He argued that as an issue it must be dealt with from the top down.

Hilal also argued that whilst women should be educated and involved in society, this should be done "within the limits of Sharia." Naeem argued that Afghan constitution and Afghan democracy had been achieved in a way in line with Islam. Sultanzoy argued that Afghanistan had made great sacrifices for democracy, and that equal rights under the law must be ensured. Arsala advocated an "independent, developed and Muslim Afghanistan."

==== Third debate ====
The third debate took place on 4 March 2014 and included three candidates: Abdullah Abdullah, Ashraf Ghani Ahmadzai, and Zalmai Rassoul. The debate focused on foreign policy. On the issue of the Durand Line, both Rassoul and Abdullah argued that the Afghan government alone cannot decide on the issue of the Durand Line, but that instead policy must be set according to the will of the people. Ahmadzai however argued that the issue of the Durand Line cannot be discussed if the conditions are not right.

All three candidates expressed their support for the Bilateral Security Agreement. On the subject of the zero-option, whereby the United States would fully pull out of Afghanistan, Rassoul argued that Afghanistan would still be in a position to accept international aid. Ahmadzai argued against the zero-option, stating that Afghan remained dangerous, but that Afghanistan would likely be stable by the end of the decade. Abdullah attacked Karzai's opposition to the zero-option, claiming that the danger of a zero-option had been caused by Karzai's "unbalanced and emotional decisions."

All three candidates accused Pakistan of aiding the Taliban. Abdullah claimed that Pakistan used the Taliban "as a tool for foreign policy." Rassoul argued that when discussing the issue a distinction had to be made between the Pakistani government and the Pakistani people, and that the Pakistani people "have been friends to the people of Afghanistan." Ahmadzai argued that extremism posed a threat to both countries, but that Afghan sovereignty had to be maintained, and that the Afghan government had to prevent Pakistan from destabilizing Afghanistan through proxies.

== Opinion polls ==
The 2014 election was the first election in Afghanistan to make use of opinion polling. A December 2013 poll by Glevum was the first of nine planned polls funded by the United States. The polls were to be conducted by three different companies, with the United States paying for them due to Afghan institutions lacking the ability and funding to conduct the polling themselves. Following the publication of a subsequent Democracy Institute poll some Afghan electoral authorities and candidate supporters alleged the polling had been biased. As response the United States cancelled funding for any further polling in order to avoid any perception of bias.

Poll source	Date(s) administered	Sample size	Abdullah Abdullah National Coalition	Mohammad Daud Sultanzoy Independent	Abdul Rahim Wardak Independent	Qayum Karzai Independent	Ashraf Ghani Independent	Sardar Mohammad Nadir Naeem Independent	Zalmai Rassoul Independent	Qutbuddin Hilal Independent	Gul Agha Sherzai Independent	Abdul Rab Rasoul Sayyaf Islamic Dawa	Hidayat Amin Arsala Independent	None	Lead
Glevum	December, 2013	2,148	25%	1%	5%	8%	29%	1%	6%	2%	4%	6%	<0.5%	11%	4
Democracy International	December, 2013	2,500	31%	–	–	13%	25%	–	–	–	-	10%	–	–	6
ATR Consulting / Tolo News	11–21 December 2013	2,063	27%	0.4%	–	4%	19%	–	–	–	–	–	0.1%	7%	8
ATR Consulting / Tolo News	8–12 October 2013	1,300	21%	–	0.8%	5.7%	13.6%	–	0.9%	–	1.1%	3.4%	–	50%	7.4
2013
Election Results	20 Aug 2009	4,597,727	30.59%	-	–	-	2.94%	–	–	–	–	–	0.05%		
2014
Election Results	5 April 2014	6,604,546	45.00%	0.46%	–	-	31.56%	–	11.37%	2.75%	1.57%	7.04%	0.23%		

== Conduct ==
=== Security concerns ===
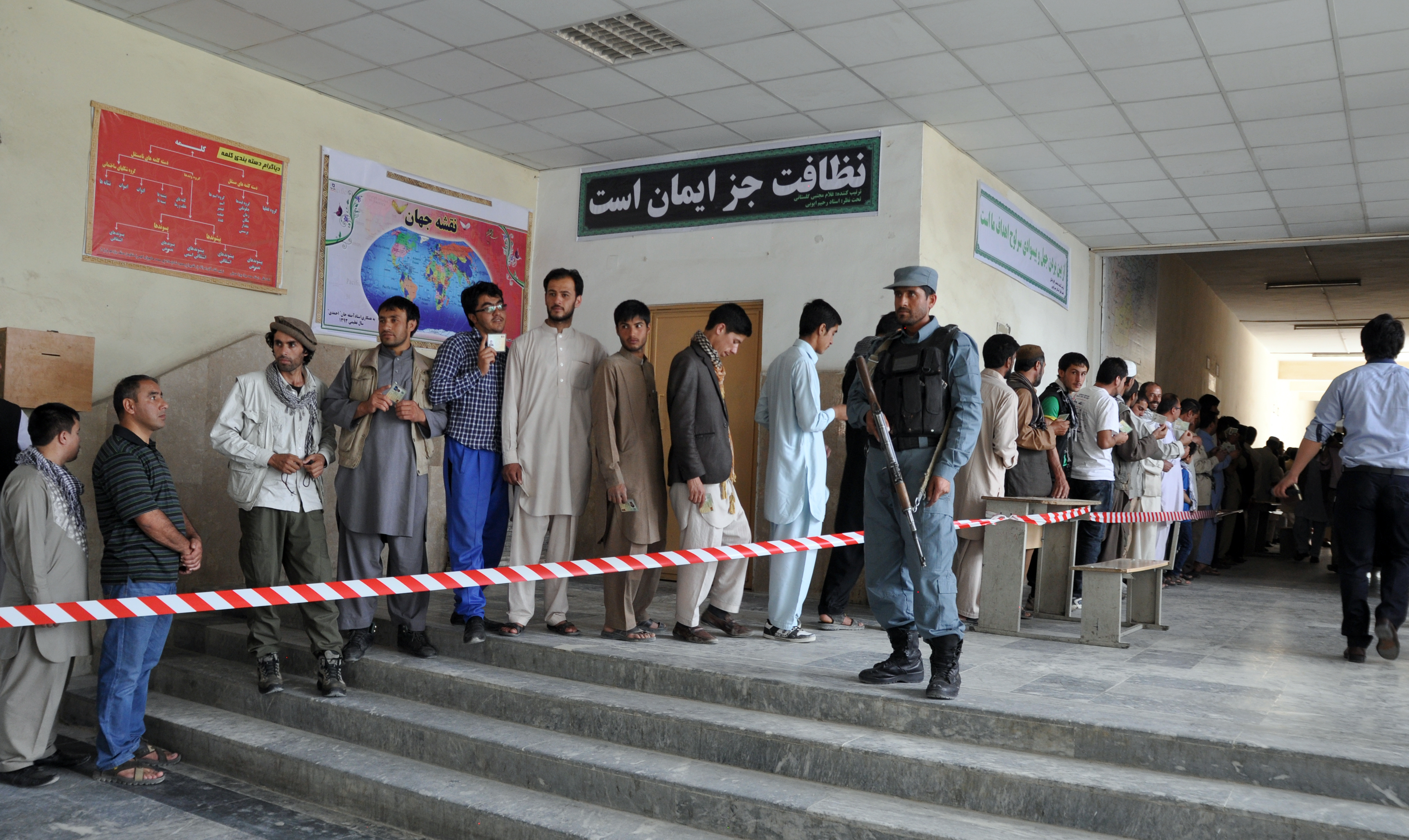
Voters queuing up in front of a polling center in Kabul during the 2014 presidential election.

On 7 April 2014, a roadside bomb was detonated in the Maywand District when a van drove over it, killing all 13 people on board. Some suspected the Taliban were responsible, though the group blamed international forces for the attack. The 2014 presidential elections is the first year Afghan National Security Forces (ANSF) have taken the lead for such an event.

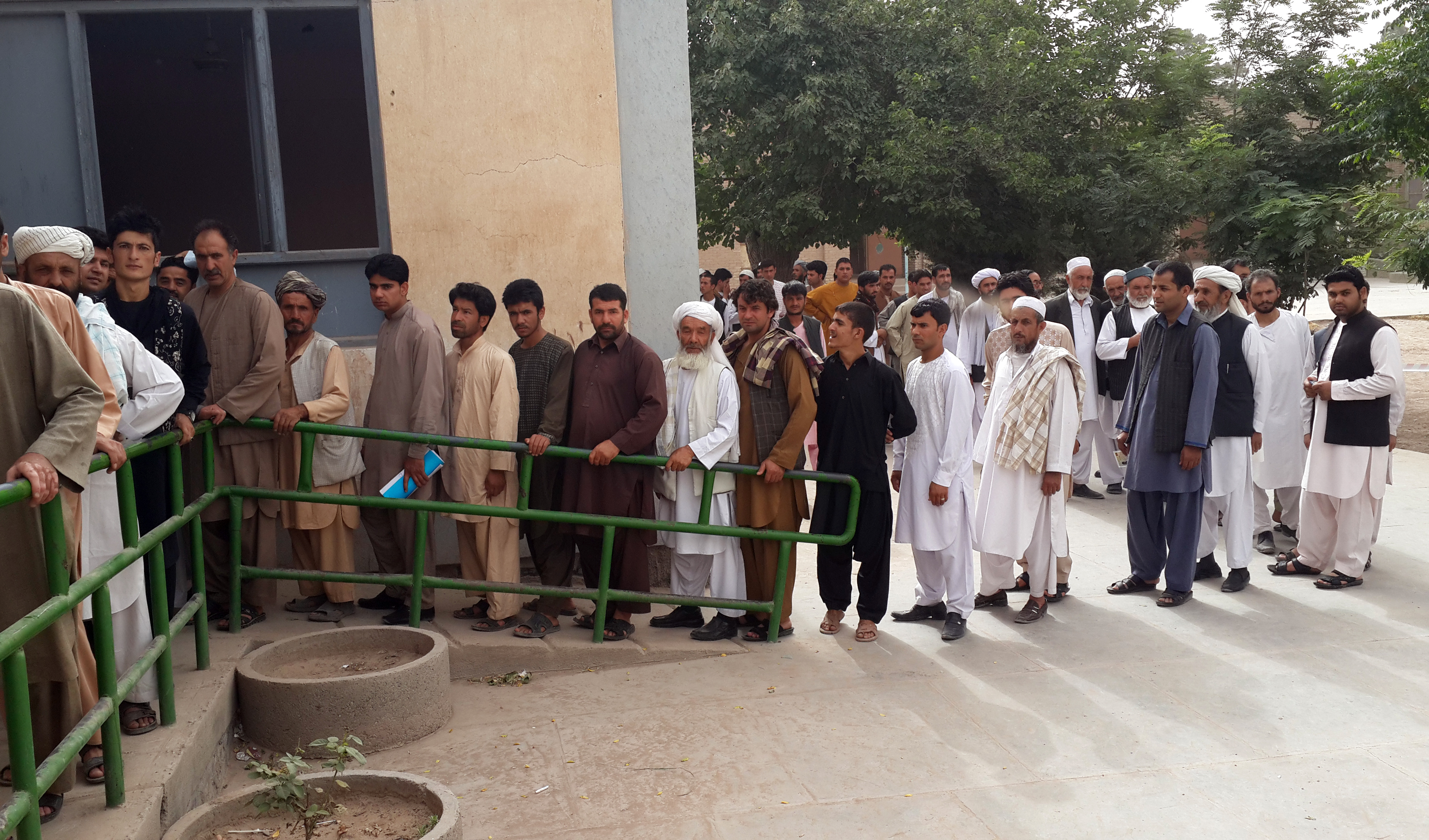
Voters queuing up in front of a polling center in western Herat province.

On 6 June 2014, candidate Abdullah Abdullah narrowly survived an assassination attempt. In the attack, suicide bombers targeted his armored car, severely damaging the vehicle and killed three of his bodyguards as well as three bystanders. Abdullah escaped largely unscathed, strongly condemning the attack while commenting, "the best response to this conspiracy is to go to vote on election day." No group immediately claimed responsibility for the attack, though the Taliban has previously threatened to violently disrupt the electoral process.

On July 1, 2014, Afghan security forces seized weapons, ammunitions and explosives and killed around 27 Taliban during operations in Kunar, Kunduz, Badakhshan, Balkh, Zabul and Helmand provinces. The next day, a suicide bomber riding a bicycle targeted a vehicle of the Afghan National Army (ANA) at around 6.30 a.m. in which 14 people, including civilians were killed.

The Afghan Intelligence – National Directorate of Security (NDS) Chief, Rahmatulllah Nabil accused Pakistan's ISI and Iranian Revolutionary Guard Corps (IRGC) of escalating clashes in the Helmand Province. The Taliban is said to have gathered hundreds of fighters in a bid of overtaking this region, amidst the U.S. withdrawal, which will be completed by December 2014.

=== Allegations of fraud ===
In July, certain allegations regarding fraudulent practices in the voting process emerged. The European Union sent 6 observers in Kabul, Balkh and Herat provinces. Thijs Berman, head of the EU election assessment team, called for an in-depth review of the electoral fraud claims and said that necessary steps would be taken to clean it. Abudullah accused President Hamid Karzai of conspiring in the rigging of the elections.

The NDS recorded Ziaul Haq Amarkhel, the secretary of Afghanistan's Independent Election Commission, telling local officials to "take sheep to the mountains, stuff them, and bring them back," in an apparent reference to ballot stuffing. In total, Nabil informed Karzai that NDS had intercepted approximately 5,000 communications with indicia of electoral fraud. Some of this evidence was leaked to Abdullah by an NDS officer. Steve Coll recounts: "Ghani's surge of votes in the second round from Pashtun areas racked by violence was inherently suspect. Some analysts guessed that if all the fraud could be identified accurately, Abdullah would have won the election, but not every international analyst agreed."

== Results ==
The preliminary results were announced on 26 April and were finalised on 15 May. About 12 million Afghans were registered to vote in the country and about 8 million members of Afghan diaspora were also eligible to vote. Nearly two-thirds of the Afghan population were under the age of 25.

No candidate secured more than the 50% of the vote, so there was a second round run-off on 14 June. Preliminary results for the second round were due on 2 July, but were delayed to 7 July. When they were announced, Ashraf Ghani had won with 56.4% of the vote.

Due to allegations of widespread fraud, US Secretary of State John Kerry announced on 12 July that all ballots would be audited under UN supervision. Following the recount, the number of valid votes had dropped from 7,972,727 in the preliminary results to 7,120,585 in the final results. The final results also showed that Ghani's vote share had decreased to 55.3%.

Candidate	Party	First round		Second round	
Candidate	Party	Votes	%	Votes	%
Abdullah Abdullah	National Coalition	2,972,141	45.00	3,185,018	44.73
Ashraf Ghani	Independent	2,084,547	31.56	3,935,567	55.27
Zalmai Rassoul	Independent	750,997	11.37		
Abdul Rasul Sayyaf	Islamic Dawah Organisation	465,207	7.04		
Qutbuddin Hilal	Independent	181,827	2.75		
Gul Agha Sherzai	Independent	103,636	1.57		
Mohammad Daud Sultanzoy	Independent	30,685	0.46		
Hedayat Amin Arsala	Independent	15,506	0.23		
Total		6,604,546	100.00	7,120,585	100.00
Valid votes		6,604,546	94.11		
Invalid/blank votes		413,503	5.89		
Total votes		7,018,049	100.00		
Registered voters/turnout		20,845,988	33.67	20,845,988	–
Source: IEC IEC, IFES

=== By province ===
Map showing the results achieved by Abdullah Abdullah and Ashraf Ghani in the first round.

Province	Abdullah Abdullah		Ashraf Ghani	
Province	Votes	%	Votes	%
Kabul	389,584	49.62	248,220	31.62
Kapisa	52,544	78.81	2,745	4.12
Parwan	107,478	71.80	8,395	5.61
Wardak	36,253	36.37	15,064	15.11
Logar	6,169	18.65	20,953	63.35
Ghazni	194,264	54.01	68,328	19.00
Paktika	19,097	10.55	118,089	65.21
Paktia	13,610	5.37	157,826	62.32
Khost	4,040	3.57	83,691	74.01
Nangarhar	63,689	19.00	200,409	59.80
Kunar	13,257	12.35	69,545	64.76
Laghman	8,495	10.4	40,673	49.82
Nuristan	23,234	37.64	9,001	14.58
Badakhshan	191,260	64.85	42,548	14.43
Takhar	159,375	50.35	121,100	38.25
Baghlan	152,560	60.14	51,953	20.48
Kunduz	100,413	47.05	80,893	37.91
Samangan	86,845	61.33	37,632	26.58
Balkh	238,582	60.92	109,694	28.01
Jowzjan	29,375	19.94	101,985	69.23
Sar-i-Pul	74,711	50.41	57,097	38.53
Faryab	77,633	29.31	173,225	65.39
Badghis	86,620	67.52	12,577	9.8
Herat	301,364	61.15	54,618	11.08
Farah	18,029	31.78	22,708	40.03
Nimroz	9,674	20.88	15,562	33.59
Helmand	17,905	17.29	34,110	32.94
Kandahar	26,500	10.61	34,698	13.9
Zabul	3,856	18.93	7,782	38.19
Urozgan	5,317	23.8	6,022	26.95
Ghor	180,446	59.51	39,698	13.09
Bamyan	113,324	67.93	18,427	11.05
Panjshir	37,925	87.29	166	0.38
Daikundi	128,713	75.05	19113	11.14
Total	2,972,141	45.00	2,084,547	31.56
Source: Mutazilah IEC

== Conclusion ==
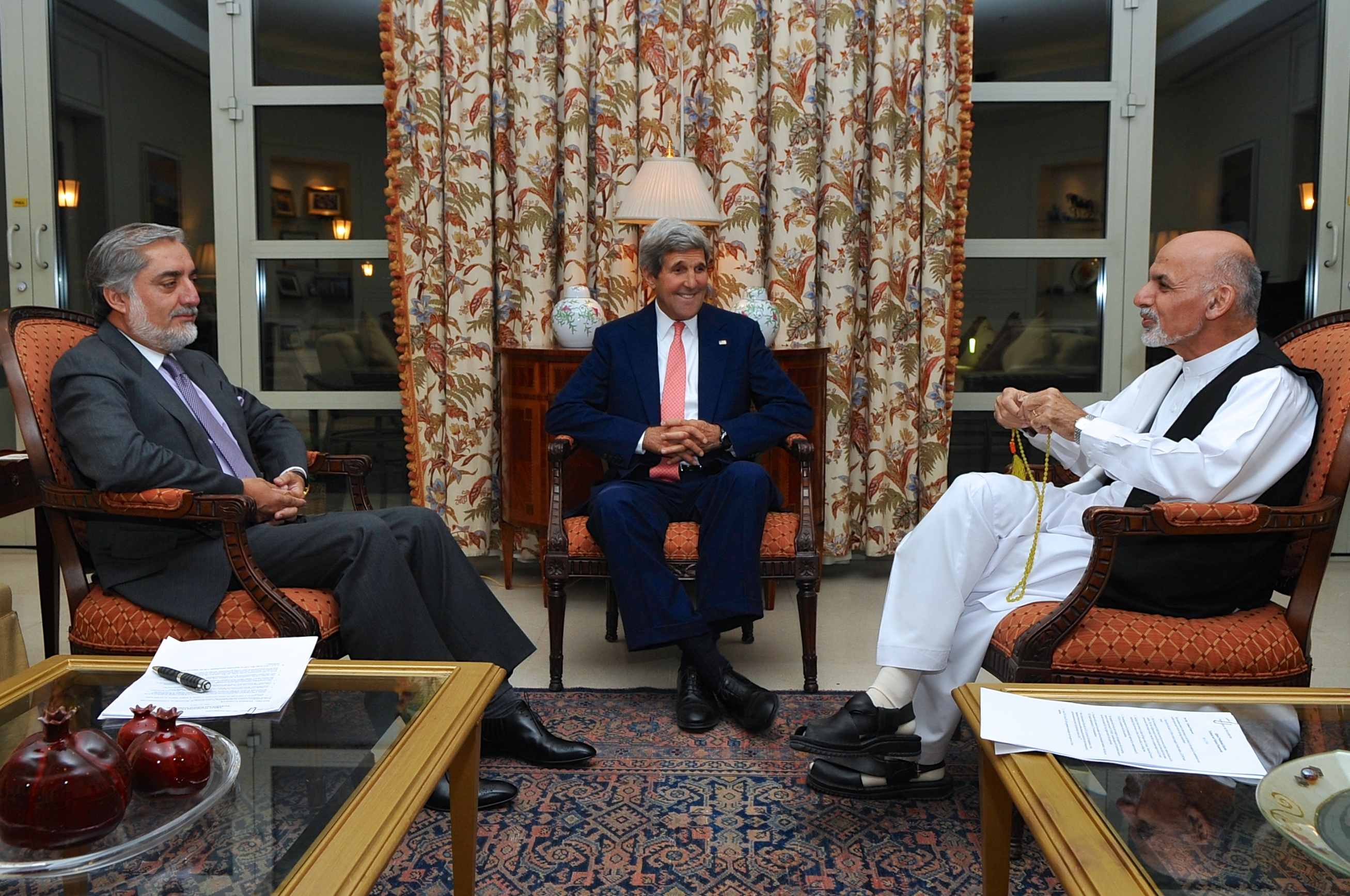
U.S. Secretary of State John Kerry sits with Afghan presidential candidates Abdullah Abdullah, left, and Ashraf Ghani, right, at the U.S. Embassy in Kabul, Afghanistan on July 12, 2014, after he helped broker an agreement on a technical and political plan to resolve the disputed outcome of the election between them.

On 24 August President Karzai met with the two candidates, and told them they should rapidly conclude the audit process. The inauguration ceremony was set for 2 September 2014, one month after it was scheduled by the UN. He also said that the inability of the candidates to compromise on the results had led to Afghanistan deteriorating. Although Karzai had insisted he would step down on 2 September, he remained in office due to security concerns. The results of the election remained in dispute, despite a proposal by the United States that the candidates agree to a power-sharing deal, which was initially agreed to. A UN-led audit failed to sway Abdullah as he insisted the audit team could not explain a million extra votes counted in the run-off. Ghani supporters insisted they wanted to do a deal and were leaving the door open to negotiations

On 19 September the Independent Election Commission announced Ghani as the winner. Five hours later, Abdullah and Ghani signed a power-sharing agreement, with Ghani being named president and Abdullah taking on an important position in the government; the deal was signed in front of the presidential palace, with incumbent president Hamid Karzai in attendance. Part of the deal stipulated that the Independent Election Commission would not release the exact vote totals of the second round of voting.
