= 2019 Afghan presidential election =

- 28 September 2019
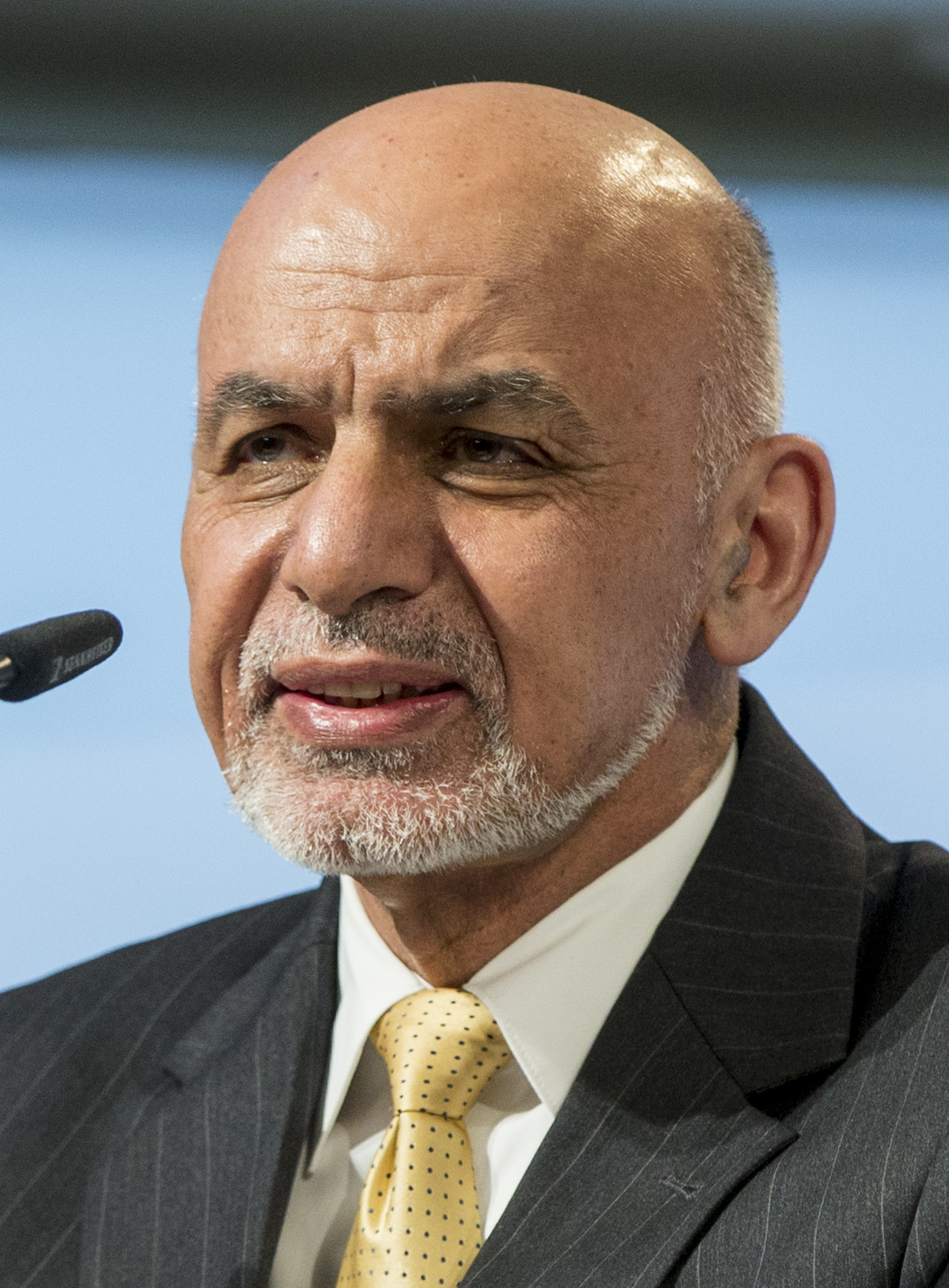

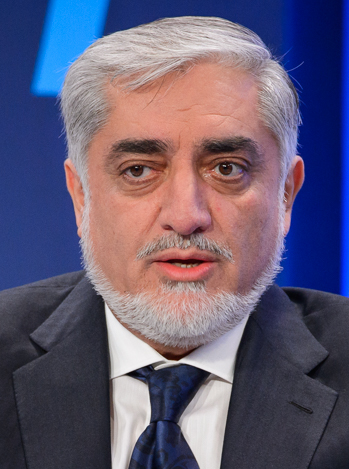
| Nominee | Ashraf Ghani | Abdullah Abdullah |
| Party | Independent | National Coalition |
| Running mate | Amrullah Saleh; Sarwar Danish | Enayatullah Babur Farahmand; Asadullah Sadati |
| Popular vote | 923,592 | 720,841 |
| Percentage | 50.64% | 39.52% |
- Results by province Ghani: 40–50% 50–60% 60–70% 70–80% 80–90% 90-100% Abdullah: 40–50% 50–60% 60–70% 70–80% 80–90%
President before election
Ashraf Ghani
Independent
Elected President
Ashraf Ghani
Independent

Presidential elections were held in Afghanistan on 28 September 2019. According to preliminary results, which runner-up Abdullah Abdullah appealed against, incumbent Ashraf Ghani was re-elected with 923,592 votes, 50.64% of the vote. After delays over disputed votes, Ghani was declared the winner in the final results on 18 February 2020. Abdullah Abdullah rejected the results and moved to set up his own parallel government and separate inauguration. However, Ghani was officially sworn in for a second term on 9 March 2020. The ensuing political crisis was not resolved until 16 May 2020, when Ghani and Abdullah signed a power-sharing deal in which Ghani would remain president and Abdullah would lead the peace talks with the Taliban when they start. Voter turnout was less than 20%.

These were the last elections in the Islamic Republic of Afghanistan prior to its collapse amidst the 2021 Taliban offensive.

== Background ==
The elections were originally scheduled for 20 April, but the Independent Election Commission announced on 26 December 2018 that they would be postponed until 20 July, in order to resolve problems that became apparent during the October 2018 parliamentary elections. The additional time will be used to verify voter lists and train election workers on the new biometric identification system. On 20 March 2019, the IEC once again delayed the election, this time by two months from 20 July to 28 September. A spokesman blamed the delay on changes in election laws along with management and technical problems − the presidential vote then coincided with local council votes and delayed parliamentary elections in Ghazni Province.

== Electoral system ==
Presidential elections in Afghanistan were conducted using a two-round system. If no candidate received a majority of the vote in the first round, a second round would have been held featuring the top two candidates from the first round.

== Campaign ==
One of the leading candidates, Mohammad Hanif Atmar, suspended his campaign in August 2019. Atmar's campaign said that the suspension was due to the poor security situation and the ongoing peace process. The Taliban carried out attacks to disrupt the campaign. On 17 September 2019, a suicide bomber attacked the campaign rally of President Ashraf Ghani, killing 26 people and wounding 42. Less than an hour later, the Taliban carried out another suicide bomb attack near the US Embassy and the Afghan Defense Ministry, killing 22 people and wounding around 38.

== Voting ==
On 28 September 2019, several people headed to cast their vote despite the direct threats to the civilians from the Taliban. However, the turnout was a historical low, where only around 1.6 million showed up from the 9.7 million registered voters. Despite low turnout, voting during election day was described by Reuters as being held in a "relative calm" situation, with 3 deaths and 37 injuries occurring due to "small-scale" Taliban attacks. Al Jazeera also noted that in spite of the low voter turnout, violence was only "sporadic." However, a tally held by The New York Times, which was based on conversations with local officials, found a death toll of "at least 30 security personnel and 10 civilians", and a number of "at least 40 security forces and 150 civilians" injured—which, according to the Times, was "much higher than the official reports, but in line with the average daily toll of the country's long-running war." Reports of low casualties were also backed by The Washington Post and Arab News. Arab News journalist Sayed Salahuddin even stated that "the death toll was lower than on previous election days" and that conversations with Afghan residents suggested that "there was less violence than at last year's parliamentary election." Salahuddin also stated that "at some polling centers, security forces outnumbered voters."

The election commission also resorted to biometric voter verification machines for the first time, which took the fingerprints and picture of every voter and recorded the time they cast their ballot. The technical system was opted to combat the growing fraudulent instances during elections in Afghanistan.

Violence, Taliban threats, and widespread allegations of mismanagement and abuse marred the election. Turnout on election day was low.

== Candidates ==
There were 18 presidential candidates:

| Name | Party affiliation | Notes |
|---|---|---|
| Ashraf Ghani | | Incumbent President |
| Abdullah Abdullah | National Coalition of Afghanistan | Incumbent Chief Executive |
| Gulbuddin Hekmatyar | Hezb-e Islami Gulbuddin | Former Prime Minister, former warlord, and current leader of Hezb-e Islami |
| Rahmatullah Nabil | | Former Head of the National Directorate of Security |
| Sayed Noorullah Jalili | | Wealthy businessman |
| Faramarz Tamanna | | Former Director General of the Center for Strategic Studies (Ministry of Foreign Affairs) |
| Shaida Mohammad Abdali | | Ambassador to India |
| Ahmad Wali Massoud | | |
| Noor Rahman Liwal | | IT expert and businessman |
| Mohammad Shohab Hakimi | | |
| Mohammad Hakim Tursun | | |
| Abdul Latif Pedram | Organisation of Toilers' Fedayan of Afghanistan; National Congress Party of Afghanistan | Member of the Parliament |
| Nur ul-Haq Ulumi | National United Party of Afghanistan | Former Minister of Interior |
| Mohammad Ibrahim Alokozai | | |
| Enayatullah Hafiz | | |
| Mohammad Hanif Atmar | Truth and Justice | Former National Security Adviser and Minister of Interior (campaign suspended) |
| Ghulam Faruq Nejrabi | | |
| Zalmai Rassoul | | Former Minister of Foreign Affairs (campaign suspended, supporting Ashraf Ghani) |

== Opinion polls ==
The 2019 presidential election was the first in Afghanistan where opinion polls were funded and conducted by Afghan institutions.

| Pollster | Date(s) administered | Sample | Ghani | Abdullah | Hekmatyar | Tamana | Nabil | Pedram | Hanif Atmar | Other | Undecided | Lead |
| Pollster | Date(s) administered | Sample | Ind | NCA | Ind | Ind | Ind | Ind | Ind | Other | Undecided | Lead |
|---|---|---|---|---|---|---|---|---|---|---|---|---|
| OSRA | 5 August–28 September 2019 | 11,337 | 40.9% | 7.0% | 0.6% | 0.7% | 0.6% | – | – | 1.5% | 20.4% | 33.9% |
| OSRA | 30 March–25 May 2019 | 2,405 | 35.1% | 5.8% | 2.5% | – | – | 1.2% | 3.3% | 3.0% | 43.3% | 29.3% |
| Preliminary results | 22 Dec 2019 | 1,824,401 | 50.6% | 39.5% | 3.9% | 1.0% | 1.9% | 0.7% | 0.1% | | | |

== Results ==
On 27 October 2019 Hawa Alam Nuristani, chief of the Independent Election Commission (IEC), announced that the preliminary presidential election results would be made public on 14 November, and that consultations with the other election commissioners which were taken to make the results more transparent had been completed. She also stated that the publication of the election results was delayed for two reasons: an attempt to hack the commission's server and the picking of the digital lock of the commission's digital center.

On 13 November, the commission announced that the results were being delayed a second time, indefinitely.

The preliminary results were announced on 22 December, and the definitive ones on 18 February 2020.

| Candidate | Party | Votes | % |
|---|---|---|---|
| Ashraf Ghani | Independent | 923,592 | 50.64 |
| Abdullah Abdullah | National Coalition | 720,841 | 39.52 |
| Gulbuddin Hekmatyar | Hezb-e Islami Gulbuddin | 70,241 | 3.85 |
| Rahmatullah Nabil | Independent | 33,919 | 1.86 |
| Faramarz Tamanna | Independent | 18,063 | 0.99 |
| Sayed Noorullah Jalili | Independent | 15,519 | 0.85 |
| Abdul Latif Pedram | National Congress Party | 12,608 | 0.69 |
| Enayatullah Hafiz | Independent | 11,375 | 0.62 |
| Mohammad Hakim Torsan | Independent | 6,500 | 0.36 |
| Ahmad Wali Massoud | Independent | 3,942 | 0.22 |
| Mohammad Shahab Hakimi | Independent | 3,318 | 0.18 |
| Ghulam Farooq Najrabi | Independent | 1,608 | 0.09 |
| Mohammad Hanif Atmar | Truth and Justice | 1,567 | 0.09 |
| Noor Rahman Lewal | Independent | 855 | 0.05 |
| Total | | 1,823,948 | 100.00 |
| Registered voters/turnout | | 9,665,745 | 18.87 |
Source: IEC

=== By province ===
| Province | Ghani | | Abdullah | | Total votes |
| Province | Votes | % | Votes | % | Total votes |
|---|---|---|---|---|---|
| Badakhshan | 15,234 | 21.72 | 39,246 | 55.96 | 70,126 |
| Baghis | 2,374 | 24.56 | 6,209 | 64.24 | 9,664 |
| Baghlan | 5,828 | 19.26 | 21,001 | 69.43 | 30,245 |
| Balkh | 24,073 | 33.27 | 40,078 | 55.39 | 72,345 |
| Bamyan | 15,021 | 18.21 | 55,795 | 67.66 | 82,452 |
| Daykundi | 29,742 | 30.29 | 62,521 | 63.68 | 98,170 |
| Farah | 3,552 | 78.22 | 539 | 11.86 | 4,541 |
| Faryab | 5,090 | 19.38 | 20,274 | 77.22 | 26,252 |
| Ghazni | 19,258 | 37.09 | 26,946 | 51.90 | 51,922 |
| Ghor | 21,553 | 44.40 | 19,849 | 40.89 | 48,540 |
| Helmand | 30,784 | 81.35 | 4,876 | 12.89 | 37,841 |
| Herat | 34,199 | 29.43 | 56,117 | 48.29 | 116,210 |
| Jowzjan | 7,305 | 19.37 | 29,006 | 76.92 | 37,710 |
| Kabul | 166,617 | 47.73 | 141,882 | 40.64 | 349,082 |
| Kandahar | 59,548 | 86.91 | 3,728 | 5.44 | 68,514 |
| Kapisa | 4,599 | 32.58 | 7,089 | 50.23 | 14,114 |
| Khost | 75,109 | 96.46 | 787 | 1.01 | 77,866 |
| Kunar | 54,907 | 85.52 | 5,072 | 7.90 | 64,205 |
| Kunduz | 3,636 | 28.68 | 8,074 | 63.70 | 12,676 |
| Laghman | 22,769 | 87.81 | 469 | 1.81 | 25,930 |
| Logar | 13,344 | 94.00 | 503 | 3.54 | 14,196 |
| Nangarhar | 188,520 | 92.22 | 4,952 | 2.42 | 204,429 |
| Nimruz | 7,186 | 73.32 | 1,482 | 15.12 | 9,801 |
| Nuristan | 6,290 | 57.87 | 3,516 | 32.35 | 10,869 |
| Paktia | 35,657 | 92.89 | 1,643 | 4.28 | 38,386 |
| Paktika | 29,499 | 93.61 | 828 | 2.63 | 31,512 |
| Panjshir | 2,079 | 11.30 | 15,343 | 83.41 | 18,393 |
| Parwan | 7,783 | 23.44 | 20,448 | 61.57 | 33,211 |
| Samangan | 7,123 | 19.05 | 28,392 | 75.93 | 37,393 |
| Sar-e Pol | 6,154 | 17.99 | 26,325 | 76.97 | 34,203 |
| Takhar | 8,582 | 13.88 | 49,514 | 80.08 | 61,832 |
| Uruzgan | 3,518 | 64.74 | 936 | 17.22 | 5,434 |
| Wardak | 1,279 | 6.43 | 17,139 | 86.12 | 19,901 |
| Zabul | 5,380 | 89.92 | 262 | 4.38 | 5,983 |
| Total | 923,592 | 50.64 | 720,841 | 39.52 | 1,823,948 |
Source: IEC

== Aftermath ==
The announcement of the results triggered a political crisis. Abdullah Abdullah rejected the results and called for the formation of a parallel government in northern Afghanistan. On 22 February Abdullah appointed a new governor loyal to himself in Sar-e Pol Province. American diplomat Zalmay Khalilzad attempted to mediate between Ghani and Abdullah, but the two were unable to reach an agreement and both of them took the presidential oath of office at separate inauguration ceremonies on 9 March, with Ghani being sworn in for a second term. Shortly afterwards, Ghani abolished the office of Chief Executive, held by Abdullah, and Abdullah issued a statement saying that "Ghani is no longer president," and his decrees were invalid.

On 23 March 2020 the United States announced that as a result of the political crisis it would reduce aid to Afghanistan by $1 billion. If Ghani and Abdullah do not reach an agreement, it may reduce aid further. The political crisis was brought to an end on 17 May 2020, when Ghani and Abdullah signed a power-sharing deal.

On 15 August 2021 Ghani's presidency came to an end after Taliban entered Kabul during the 2021 Taliban offensive and Ghani fled Afghanistan. Vice President Amrullah Saleh declared himself transitional president in Bazarak, capital of Panjshir Province and the last region under government control; however, he was forced to leave after Panjshir was captured altogether by the Taliban on 8 September.
