= Coalition for the Salvation of Afghanistan =

Political alliance in Afghanistan

The Coalition for the Salvation of Afghanistan is a political alliance in Afghanistan formed to oppose the government of Ashraf Ghani.

== History ==
Formed in July 2017 in Ankara, Turkey, the Coalition is an alliance of four political figures: Atta Mohammed Noor, the Tajik governor of Balkh province and chief of the Jamiat-e Islami party; Foreign Minister Salahuddin Rabbani, also of the Jamaat-e-Islami; ethnic Hazara Mohammad Mohaqiq, chair of the People's Islamic Unity Party of Afghanistan and the Uzbek warlord Abdul Rashid Dostum, leader of the National Islamic Movement of Afghanistan and former vice-president.

The alliance, comprising the leaders of the three main ethnic minorities in Afghanistan, the Tajiks, Uzbeks and Hazaras, can be seen as a challenge to a perceived Pashtun dominated political system in Afghanistan.

=== Government response ===
President Ghani has responded by calling on the Coalition to submit their reform suggestions and clarified his position on the new coalition by saying, "Da Gaz Da Maidan", a Pashtun proverb meaning "bring it on".
