= National Coalition of Afghanistan =

National Coalition of Afghanistan Etelaf-e Milli
- Leader: Abdullah Abdullah
- Founded: 18 March 2010
- Dissolved: 15 August 2021
- Colors: Dark Blue; Brown; Black; Red; Dark Green

Website
- www.nca.af

The National Coalition of Afghanistan (Dari: ائتلاف ملی, Etelaf-e Milli; previously known as the Coalition for Change and Hope) was a political coalition in Afghanistan led by Abdullah Abdullah, Afghanistan's former foreign minister (2001–2005) and main challenger of President Hamid Karzai in the 2009 Afghan presidential elections. Abdullah Abdullah was a close friend of the Northern Alliance leader Ahmad Shah Massoud who was assassinated two days before the September 11 attacks.

Besides the National Front of Afghanistan, the National Coalition acted as the leading democratic opposition movement against the governments of Hamid Karzai and Ashraf Ghani. Abdullah Abdullah was supported among others by the governor of Balkh province, Ustad Atta Mohammad Noor. Both Abdullah and Atta Noor derive from the Jamiat-e Islami like National Front of Afghanistan chairman Ahmad Zia Massoud and former intelligence chief Amrullah Saleh.

The coalition ended with the Taliban takeover of Kabul in 2021.

== 2001 ==
After the Taliban were removed from power by United Front ground forces and NATO special forces in late 2001, the Shura-e Nazar which more or less had already been replaced by the United Front, dissolved as an organization. Many of its members are still connected and organised within this political party (The National Coalition of Afghanistan).

== 2010 parliamentary elections ==
The group ran candidates in the 2010 parliamentary election, winning more than 90 out of 249 seats in the parliament and thus becoming the main democratic opposition movement. As a result, it was assumed that the new parliament would introduce some checks and balances on the presidential power. The Coalition intends to focus on issues including the fight against corruption and reform of the Afghan electoral system. The current spokesman is Sayeed Agha Hossein Fazel Sangcharaki.

Regarding the Taliban insurgency and Karzai's strategy of negotiations Dr. Abdullah stated:

"I should say that Taliban are not fighting in order to be accommodated. They are fighting in order to bring the state down. So it's a futile exercise, and it's just misleading. ... There are groups that will fight to the death. Whether we like to talk to them or we don't like to talk to them, they will continue to fight. So, for them, I don't think that we have a way forward with talks or negotiations or contacts or anything as such. Then we have to be prepared to tackle and deal with them militarily. In terms of the Taliban on the ground, there are lots of possibilities and opportunities that with the help of the people in different parts of the country, we can attract them to the peace process; provided, we create a favorable environment on this side of the line."

== 2014 presidential elections ==
The group ran candidates in the 2014 presidential election. Abdullah Abdullah represented The National Coalition of Afghanistan again in these elections, and competed against Ashraf Ghani for presidency with a second-round of elections.

== Change of name ==
In December 2011, the Coalition for Change and Hope was broadened and transformed into the National Coalition of Afghanistan supported by dozens of Afghan political parties and led by Abdullah Abdullah to challenge the government of Hamid Karzai. Major figures associated with the coalition include:

- Yunus Qanooni (the former head of the Afghan Parliament)
- Homayoon Shah-asefi (a former presidential candidate and leader of the monarchist National Islamic Front of Afghanistan with ties to the family of former king Zahir Shah)
- Mohammad Asim Asim (the former acting minister of ministry of communication and former member of parliament)
- Nur ul-Haq Ulumi (a senior political figure in the former Afghan communist government)
- Ahmad Wali Massoud (a younger brother of Ahmad Shah Massoud)
- Several Members of Parliament.

== Electoral history ==
=== Presidential elections ===
| Election | Party candidate | Running mate | Votes | % | Votes | % | Result |
| Election | Party candidate | Running mate | First Round | | Second Round | | Result |
|---|---|---|---|---|---|---|---|
| 2014 | Abdullah Abdullah | Mohammad Khan | 2,972,141 | 45.00% | 3,185,018 | 44.73% | Lost ✗ |
| 2014 | Abdullah Abdullah | Mohammad Mohaqiq | 2,972,141 | 45.00% | 3,185,018 | 44.73% | Lost ✗ |
| 2019 | Abdullah Abdullah | Enayatullah Babur Farahmand | 720,841 | 39.52% | - | - | Lost ✗ |
| 2019 | Abdullah Abdullah | Asadullah Sadati | 720,841 | 39.52% | - | - | Lost ✗ |

== See also ==
- Abdullah Abdullah
- Ustad Atta Mohammad Noor
- Amrullah Saleh
- Ahmad Shah Massoud
- National Front of Afghanistan

== Bibliography ==
- Cross, Tony (2010-02-19). "Abdullah slams Karzai's Taliban peace plan". Radio France Internationale.
- "Afghan challenger Abdullah touts new coalition". Hindustan Times. 2010-02-19. Archived from the original on 2011-06-05.
