= Nur ul-Haq Ulumi =

Afghan politician

Interior Minister Afghanistan
- In office 27 January 2015 – 24 February 2016
- President: Ashraf Ghani Ahmadzai
- Preceded by: Sattar General Ayub Salangi (acting)
- Succeeded by: Taj Muhammad Jahid

Member of the Wolesi Jirga for Kandahar
- In office 2005–2010

Governor of Kandahar Province
- In office 1989–1992
- President: Mohammad Najibullah

Personal details
- Born: 15 August 1941 (age 85) Kandahar, Kingdom of Afghanistan
- Citizenship: Netherlands
- Party: NUPA (from 2003)
- Other political affiliations: PDPA (until 1992)
- Children: 3
- Education: University of Kabul

Military service
- Branch/service: Afghan Army
- Years of service: 1963–1992
- Rank: Lieutenant General
- Commands: 1st Central Army Corps (Kabul); 2nd Army Corps (Kandahar)
- Battles/wars: Soviet–Afghan War; Afghan Civil War (1989–1992)

Nur ul-Haq Ulumi (born 15 August 1941) is an Afghan politician, who served as Minister of Interior from 2015 to 2016, and as a Member of the House of the People from 2005 to 2010 representing Kandahar. He founded and previously led the National United Party of Afghanistan, a small left-wing and secular party in Afghanistan that is a member of the National Coalition of Afghanistan. Ulumi previously served in the Afghan Army as a member of the Parcham faction of the People's Democratic Party of Afghanistan during the Afghan Civil War (1989–1992), and left service with the rank of lieutenant general. He was a candidate in the 2019 Afghan presidential election.

== Early life ==
Ulumi was born on 15 August 1941 in Kandahar Province. His family were an important Pashtun family from the Barakzai Tribe.

== Military career ==
Ulumi graduated from the University of Kabul magna cum laude in 1966.

Ulumi was trained in both the United States and the Soviet Union.

=== Afghan Civil War ===
Ulumi saw action at the Battle of Jalalabad, where he played an important role in defeating the mujahideen offensive. Following his success at Jalalabad he was given a new position as Governor of Kandahar. This is according to Peter Tomsen, but Tomsen is characteristically inaccurate. Ulumi was promoted to Kandahar governor in 1988 (see Mark Urban's "War in Afghanistan", written - unlike Tomsen's book - without political retrospective) and was still in Kandahar during the 1989 Jalalabad battle. The Jalalabad battle was actually led by Manokai Mangal and Asif Dilawar; Ulumi played no part though another Parchami interior minister, Hanif Atmar, was involved as an officer.

Kandahar underwent a complete sociopolitical collapse in the early 1990s, driven in part by the divide-and-rule tactics of the communist governor-general, Nur ul-Haq Ulumi, who manipulated rival mujahideen factions against each other, and by the rampant greed within both the communist and mujahideen militias.

==== Governor of Kandahar ====
In his new role as governor, Ulumi enacted a number of major changes to regional government policy in order to help implement the Afghan Government's National Reconciliation. Firstly, he persuaded President Najibullah to withdraw Abdul Rashid Dostum's hated Jouzjani militia from Kandahar, he stopped forced conscription into the Army, he encouraged local unemployed youth to join his local paid militia to help defend Kandahar, he complied with prisoner release requests from moderate mujahideen commanders, and he didn't interfere with the mujahideen-run narcotics smuggling trade.

Ulumi co-opted local mujahideen forces by providing them with incentives, such as money or permission to visit their families within Kandahar, in exchange for the mujahideen scaling down attacks on local government forces. In the case of Ahmed Gailani, Ulumi was related to the wife of Ahmed Gailani, due to her being a member of the Mohammadzai clan. As such he was able to reach out to and ease relations with Gailani's National Islamic Front of Afghanistan, inviting Gailani's son Hasan to Kandahar for negotiations.

Ulumi was also able to reach out to Gul Agha Sherzai by emphasising their common Barakzai heritage as well as by offering financial incentives. Under a jointly agreed plan, Gul Agha would launch attacks on Kandahar Airport that had been pre-planned with Ulumi. Gul Agha's forces would fire off rockets and weapons at the airport, whilst forces under Ulumi would light fires and make loud noises. ISI forces observing the operation would then believe Gul Agha to be fighting the government, and would then supply him with weapons and food, which Ulumi allowed Gul Agha to sell within Kandahar.

This made coordination of attacks between various mujahideen groups increasing difficult, although some groups such as Hezbi Islami refused any compromise with the Afghan government. Their refusal to compromise was in turn rewarded by funding from Pakistan, who made several failed attempts to unite the mujahideen.

Kandahar underwent a complete sociopolitical collapse in the early 1990s, driven in part by the divide and rule tactics of Nur ul-Haq Ulumi, who manipulated rival mujahideen factions against each other. During the Civil War, Ulumi also commanded the Afghan Army's Kandahar Corps.

=== End of the conflict ===
Ulumi, as commander of Afghan government forces in Kabul, surrendered Kabul in April 1992 to advancing mujahideen forces. After the conflict had ended Ulumi moved to the Netherlands, where lived in Landgraaf. He returned to Afghanistan after the overthrow of the Taliban in 2001.

== Political career ==
Ulumi was elected as an MP for Kandahar Province in 2005, with 13,035 out of a total of 178,269 votes. The only candidate to receive a higher number of votes was Qayum Karzai, the elder brother of President Hamid Karzai, who received 14,243 votes. In 2010 Ulumi failed to be re-elected, failing to receive even 3,000 out of a total of 85,385 votes. There were also accusations of electoral fraud and vote rigging.

During his term as an MP Ulumi chaired the Afghan Parliament's Defence Committee.

He was nominated to be Minister of Interior by Abdullah Abdullah in the unity government of Ashraf Ghani in January 2015. He had supported Abdullah Abdullah in the 2014 Afghan presidential election. However, a ban was imposed by the Parliament on cabinet minister appointments with dual citizenship. After giving up his dual citizenship Ulumi was nominated again. He was confirmed as Interior Minister on 27 January 2015. He left the post in February 2016, reportedly resigning due to differences with other officials, assuming the role of Ambassador to the Netherlands.

He unsuccessfully ran as a candidate in the 2019 Afghan presidential election as leader of the newly formed Afghanistan People's National Front (Jabha-e-Milli Mardum-e-Afghanistan). He repeatedly raised concerns about vote-rigging. He has since been appointed Special Representative for Good Governance.

=== Political views ===
Ulumi maintains that the Soviet intervention in Afghanistan was only done at Afghanistan's behest, and that Soviet actions in the conflict were done in support of the Afghan government, who retained operational command. Ulumi also argues that during the rule of the PDPA, Afghans could approach the government and seek redress for issues free from corruption or tribalism.

Ulumi has blamed the rise in Taliban activity in southern Afghanistan on the failure of the Afghan government to build a fair government, free from corruption.

== Personal life ==
Ulumi's elder brother was a powerful general in President Najibullah's government and was assassinated by the mujaheddin. Ulumi speaks English and Russian fluently. Ulumi has two daughters and a son, all of whom live in the Netherlands.
