= National United Party of Afghanistan =

Political party in Afghanistan

National United Party of Afghanistan حزب متحد ملی افغانستان
- Leader: Bahadur Ayubi
- Founder: Nur ul-Haq Ulumi
- Founded: 21 August 2003
- Dissolved: 16 August 2023 (banned)
- Preceded by: PDPA (Parcham)
- National affiliation: National Coalition of Afghanistan
- Seats in the Leadership Council: 0 / 30

Party flag

Website
- mehrwatan.com

The National United Party of Afghanistan (Dari: حزب متحد ملی افغانستان, Hezb-e Muttahed-e Melli-ye Afghanistan) is a political party in Afghanistan.

== History ==
The party was formed on 21 August 2003 by a group of former People's Democratic Party of Afghanistan (PDPA) members. The party was registered on 21 August 2003. The party aims to unite all the former members of the PDPA.

The party was founded by General Nur ul-Haq Ulumi, a former member of the Central Committee of the PDPA's Parcham faction, and is a member of the National Coalition of Afghanistan led by Abdullah Abdullah.

Ulumi, the party's leader, was elected as an MP for Kandahar Province in 2005, with 13,035 out of a total of 178,269 votes. The only candidate to receive a higher number of votes was Qayum Karzai, the elder brother of President Hamid Karzai, who received 14,243 votes. In 2010 Ulumi failed to be re-elected, failing to receive even 3,000 out of a total of 85,385 votes, amid accusations of electoral fraud and vote rigging.

Having supported Abdullah Abdullah in the 2014 Afghan presidential election, party leader Nur ul-Haq Ulumi was nominated by Abdullah to be Minister of Interior in the unity government of Ashraf Ghani in January 2015. However, Parliament introduced a ban on cabinet minister appointments with dual citizenship. After renouncing his dual citizenship with the Netherlands, Ulumi was nominated again, and confirmed as Interior Minister on 27 January 2015. As it is prohibited under Afghan law for ministers of the military hold party membership, Ulumi's party membership was cancelled in the party for his tenure as minister, and was replaced by current acting leader Engineer Bahadur Ayubi.

== See also ==
- Watan Party of Afghanistan
