= President of Afghanistan =

Head of state and government (1973–2021)

- د افغانستان جمهور رئیس (Pashto) رئیس جمهور افغانستان (Dari)
- Emblem of the Islamic Republic of Afghanistan

- Presidential standard
- Status: Office abolished
- Member of: Cabinet
- Residence: The Arg
- Seat: Kabul
- Appointer: Direct election
- Term length: 5 years, renewable once
- Precursor: King of Afghanistan
- Formation: 17 July 1973 (original); 7 December 2004 (latest form)
- First holder: Mohammed Daoud Khan
- Final holder: Ashraf Ghani
- Abolished: 15 August 2021
- Superseded by: Supreme Leader
- Deputy: Vice President
- Salary: ؋960,000 monthly
- Website: president.gov.af (inactive) (15 August 2021 archive)

The president of Afghanistan was constitutionally the head of state and head of government of the Islamic Republic of Afghanistan and Commander-in-Chief of the Afghan Armed Forces. Following the 2021 Taliban offensive and Taliban capture of the capital, final incumbent President Ashraf Ghani fled the country.

== Eligibility and selection process ==
Article 62 of the 2004 Constitution of Afghanistan stated that a candidate for the office of President had to:

- be a citizen of Afghanistan, Muslim, born of Afghan parents;
- not be a citizen of another country;
- be at least forty years old when declaring candidacy;
- not have been convicted of crimes against humanity, a criminal act or deprived of civil rights by a court;
- not have previously served more than two terms as president.

== Powers ==
The 2004 Constitution granted the president wide powers over military and legislative affairs, with a relatively weak national bicameral National Assembly, the House of the People (Wolesi Jirga) and the House of Elders (Meshrano Jirga). A president could only serve up to two five-year terms.

Hamid Karzai began his first five-year term in 2004. After his second term ended in 2014, Ashraf Ghani was elected as the next Afghan president. Ghani remained president from 2014 until 2021, when he fled the country due to the 2021 Taliban offensive.

== Last election ==
Candidate	Party	Votes	%
Ashraf Ghani	Independent	923,592	50.64
Abdullah Abdullah	National Coalition	720,841	39.52
Gulbuddin Hekmatyar	Hezb-e Islami Gulbuddin	70,241	3.85
Rahmatullah Nabil	Independent	33,919	1.86
Faramarz Tamanna	Independent	18,063	0.99
Noorullah Jalili	Independent	15,519	0.85
Abdul Latif Pedram	National Congress Party	12,608	0.69
Enayatullah Hafiz	Independent	11,375	0.62
Mohammad Hakim Torsan	Independent	6,500	0.36
Ahmad Wali Massoud	Independent	3,942	0.22
Mohammad Shahab Hakimi	Independent	3,318	0.18
Ghulam Farooq Najrabi	Independent	1,608	0.09
Mohammad Hanif Atmar	Truth and Justice	1,567	0.09
Noor Rahman Lewal	Independent	855	0.05
Total		1,823,948	100.00
Registered voters/turnout		9,665,745	18.87
Source: IEC

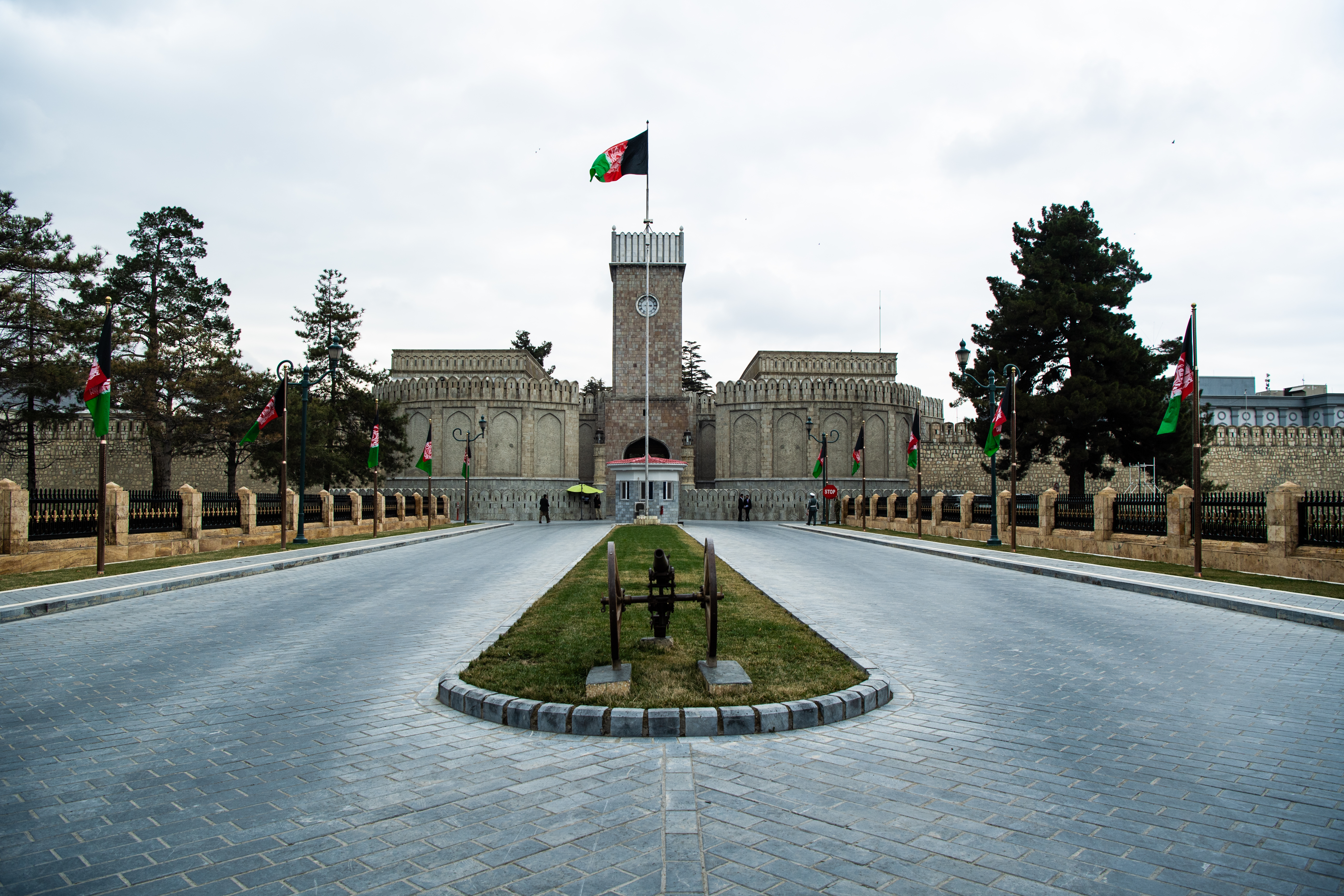
The Arg (the presidential palace)

== See also ==
- Prime Minister of Afghanistan
- Chief Executive (Afghanistan)
