= Ahmad Zia Massoud =

Afghan politician (born 1956)

Ahmad Zia Massoud احمد ضیاء مسعود
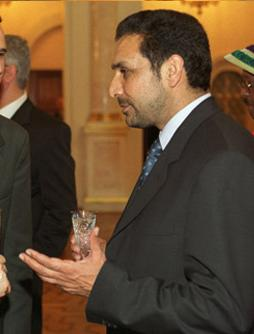
- Ahmad Zia Massoud in 2010

First Vice President of Afghanistan
- In office 7 December 2004 – 19 November 2009
- President: Hamid Karzai
- Preceded by: office created
- Succeeded by: Mohammed Fahim

Personal details
- Born: 1 May 1956 (age 70) Muqur District, Ghazni Province, Kingdom of Afghanistan
- Party: Jamiat-e Islami
- Relations: Ahmad Shah Massoud (brother)
- Children: 4
- Occupation: Politician

Military service
- Battles/wars: Republican insurgency in Afghanistan

Ahmad Zia Massoud (Note: Dari: احمد ضیاء مسعود) (born 1 May 1956) is an Afghan politician who served as the first vice president of Afghanistan in the first elected administration of President Hamid Karzai, from December 2004 to November 2009.

He is a younger brother of the late Ahmad Shah Massoud, the resistance leader against the Soviet invasion of Afghanistan and against the Taliban. In late 2011, Ahmad Zia Massoud joined hands with major leaders in the National Front of Afghanistan, which strongly opposed a return of the Taliban to power. The National Front was generally regarded as a reformation of the United Front (Northern Alliance) which with U.S. air support temporarily removed the Taliban from power in late 2001.

== Biography ==
Ahmad Zia Massoud was born on May 1, 1956, in Muqur district, which is located in Ghazni province of Afghanistan. He attended the Lycée Esteqlal in Kabul. In 1976, he was admitted to the Polytechnical University of Kabul where he studied for three years. Caught up in the tumultuous events in the country after the communist Saur Revolution he left the university and joined the mujahideen led by his brother Ahmad Shah Massoud in the Panjshir Valley north of Kabul.

From 1978 to 1981, Ahmad Zia directed the resistance forces of Paryan in Haut-Panjsher. Between 1981 and April 1992, his commander and brother Ahmed Shah Massoud named him special representative of the Jamiat-e-Islami party to Peshawar, Pakistan, where the seven principal parties of the Afghan resistance met. During this period he maintained and increased contacts with political leaders of all the Afghan resistance movement, including diplomatic circles and international organizations. He also traveled abroad to make the case for the mujahideen.

After the fall of the Soviet-backed communist regime, Burhanuddin Rabbani, his father-in-law, chose him to be an advisor and special representative of the Islamic State of Afghanistan. The Taliban eventually took power in Kabul and established the Islamic Emirate of Afghanistan. Ahmad Zia Massoud joined the anti-Taliban United Islamic Front led by his brother Ahmad Shah Massoud. In the late 1990s, Ahmad Zia Massoud continued his political and diplomatic activities, working to raise the profile of Afghanistan on the international stage, and to call attention to the horrors of the Taliban.

In December 2001, after the fall of the Taliban regime, President Hamid Karzai named him ambassador to the Russian Federation under Vladimir Putin. In February 2004 Ahmad Zia's functions were extended to include the Republic of Armenia, and then in July of that year, Belarus, and Moldova as well. He is the First Deputy of Zalmai Rassoul in the Afghanistan presidential elections of 2014.

On July 26, 2004, Karzai announced that he had chosen Ahmad Zia Massoud as his running mate over Defense Minister Mohammad Qasim Fahim in the October 9, 2004 presidential elections. While campaigning in the 2004 elections a bomb was detonated at a political rally of Massoud in the northern Afghan city of Feyzabad. Two people were killed but Massoud emerged unscathed.

After several political disputes between Ahmad Zia Massoud and Hamid Karzai, the two men parted ways. In the 2009 presidential elections Karzai ran on an election ticket with Mohammad Qasim Fahim instead. In December 2009 another bomb blast is believed to have targeted Ahmad Zia Massoud. He emerged unharmed while 8 people were killed and 40 wounded.

== National Front of Afghanistan ==
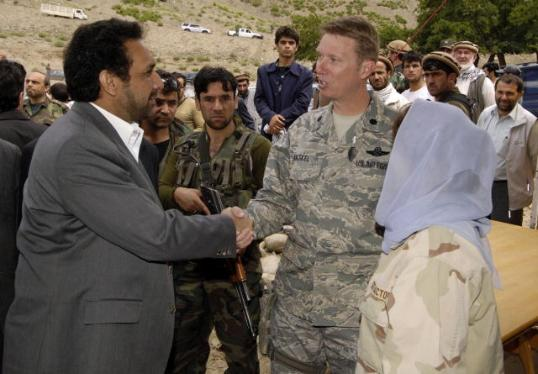
Ahmad Zia Massoud as Vice President of Afghanistan shaking hands with a U.S. Provincial Reconstruction Team at the ceremony for a new road.

If the Taliban are imposed on Afghanistan, there will be resistance.

In late 2011, Ahmad Zia Massoud united major political anti-Taliban leaders in the National Front of Afghanistan, which strongly opposes a return of the Taliban to power. The National Front retains significant military capabilities.

U.S. Congressman Louie Gohmert wrote, "These leaders who fought with embedded Special Forces to initially defeat the Taliban represent over 60-percent of the Afghan people, yet are being entirely disregarded by the Obama and Karzai Administrations in negotiations."

In January 2012, Ahmad Zia Massoud, Abdul Rashid Dostum, leader of the Uzbek-dominated Junbish-i Milli, Haji Mohammad Mohaqiq, one leader of the Hazara Shia Hezb-e Wahdat, and Amrullah Saleh, former director of the Afghan intelligence service NDS and leader of the Basij-e Milli, came together in a meeting with US congressmen in Berlin and signed a joint declaration:

"We call for a national dialogue on a revised Constitution to correct the inherent flaws in the present power structure by decentralizing the political system, making it more compatible with the diverse political, social and cultural nature of Afghanistan. The Afghan people deserve and need a parliamentary form of democracy instead of a personality-centered Presidential system.

We firmly believe that any negotiation with the Taliban can only be acceptable, and therefore effective, if all parties to the conflict are involved in the process. The present form of discussions with the Taliban is flawed, as it excludes anti-Taliban Afghans. It must be recalled that the Taliban extremists and their Al-Qaeda supporters were defeated by Afghans resisting extremism with minimal human embedded support from the United States and International community. The present negotiations with the Taliban fail to take into account the risks, sacrifices and legitimate interests of the Afghans who ended the brutal oppression of all Afghans.

In order to speed the withdrawal of international forces, the participants believe it is essential to strengthen regional and national institutions that are inclusive and represent the concerns of all the communities of Afghanistan. The participants favor a change in the Electoral System from a Single Non Transferable Vote System to a nationally accepted variant of the Proportional Representation system with equal opportunities for both independent candidates, the political parties, or tribal representatives. We also support the election of Governors and empowerment of provincial councils. Such elected Governors and provincial councils should also have authority for such things as creating budgets and generating revenue, overseeing police and healthcare, as well as establishing educational authority, if they so desire."

— National Front Berlin Declaration, January 2012

The Asia Times writes: "This is the first time that the leadership of the Tajik, Uzbek and Hazara communities [of Afghanistan] has come to a common line of thinking ... In essence, the Northern Alliance is being resuscitated as a political entity. ... As the Northern Alliance groups see it, Pakistani strategy is to wait out the period between now and 2014 - the date set for the US troop withdrawal - and then regroup the Taliban and make a bid to capture power in Kabul. Their strong show of unity in Berlin suggests that they will not roll over and give way to an exclusive US-Taliban-Pakistan settlement being imposed on their nation."

== 2014 presidential elections ==
In the 2014 presidential elections Ahmad Zia Massoud ran with then Foreign Minister Dr. Zalmai Rassoul in the 2014 Afghan presidential election. During the second round of the election he endorsed candidate Dr. Ashraf Ghani Ahmadzai. Publicly they had signed an agreement that Ahmad Zia Massoud would hold the position of chief executive officer under Ghani's administration. However, with the difficulties during the second round of the election between the two presidential candidates Dr. Ashraf Ghani Ahmadzai and Dr. Abdullah Abdullah, Ahmad Zia Massoud stepped aside leaving the position of chief executive officer to Dr. Abdullah Abdullah who had demanded the same position after losing the race. Currently Ahmad Zia Massoud holds the position of The Special Representative of the President of Afghanistan in Reform and Good Governance.

== Personal life ==
Ahmad Zia Massoud is married to a daughter of Burhanuddin Rabbani. They have four children.

== See also ==
- Ahmad Shah Massoud
- National Front of Afghanistan
- Christian H. Cooper
- Amrullah Saleh
- Haji Mohammad Mohaqiq
- Abdullah Abdullah
- Abdul Rashid Dostum
- Ustad Atta Mohammad Noor
- Politics of Afghanistan
- List of leaders of Afghanistan

Political offices
Preceded by Position created	Vice President of Afghanistan; 2004-2009	Succeeded by Mohammed Fahim
