= Qutbuddin Hilal =

Afghan politician

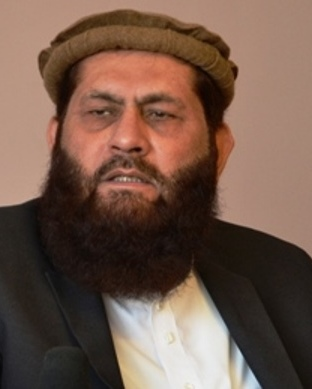

Deputy Prime Minister
- In office 1993–1994
- President: Burhanuddin Rabbani

Personal details
- Born: 1952 (age 72–73); Khost, Kingdom of Afghanistan
- Political party: Hezbi Islami
- Children: 6

Qutbuddin Hilal (Pashto: قطب الدين هلال) (born 1952) is an Afghan politician, who served as the Deputy prime minister in 1993 and 1996 during the tenure of Burhanuddin Rabbani when Gulbuddin Hekmatyar was Prime Minister. He announced his candidacy in September 2013 to stand candidate in the 2014 Presidential elections.

== Early life ==
Qutubddin Hilal is son of Maulvi Zaheeruddin, was born in 1952 in the Zazai Maidan district of Khost Province. He graduated from Kabul Military Academy in 1970 and pursued his higher education in construction engineering. He received a bachelor's degree in Civil Engineering from the Engineering Academy in 1975.

An ethnic Pashtun, he is fluent in Dari, Pashto, English, Arabic and Urdu.

Hilal worked as an engineer in the Defence Ministry for years until 1978. He was imprisoned in Pul-i-Charkhi prison on charges of anti-state activities during communist regime. After his release, he went to Pakistan and joined the resistance movement the Hezbi Islami Afghanistan (HIA) led by Gulbuddin Hekmatyar.

== 2014 Presidential Election ==
In 2013 Hilal filed nomination papers for the Afghanistan Presidential elections of 2014. as an independent candidate with Inayatullah Inayat his first vice president and Mohammad Ali Nabizada as his second vice president.

Preliminary Results of 2014 Presidential Election showed that he has received 2.73% (180,859) of the total votes.

== See also ==
- Afghanistan
- Cabinet of Ministers
- Politics of Afghanistan
