= National Front of Afghanistan =

Militant group in Afghanistan

- Flag flown by the National Front of Afghanistan
- Leaders: Ahmad Zia Massoud; Haji Mohammad Mohaqiq; Abdul Rashid Dostum
- Dates active: 2011–2021
- Active regions: Afghanistan
- Ideology: Islamic democracy
- Wars: War in Afghanistan (2001–2021)

The National Front of Afghanistan (NFA; Persian: جبهه ملی افغانستان, romanized: Jabha-ye Millī Afğānistān; also Afghanistan National Front, ANF), or Jabha-ye Melli, was established in late 2011 by Ahmad Zia Massoud, Haji Mohammad Mohaqiq and Abdul Rashid Dostum. It was generally regarded as a reformation of parts of the military wing which once existed of the United Front (Northern Alliance) which with U.S. air support removed the Taliban from power in Afghanistan in late 2001. The National Front strongly opposed a return of the Taliban to power but failed to keep them in check. The chairman of the National Front was Ahmad Zia Massoud, the younger brother of the Northern Alliance leader Ahmad Shah Massoud who was assassinated two days before the September 11 attacks in 2001. It is unclear if it is still in operation, as Afghanistan's Republican government has collapsed.

== 2001 ==
After the Taliban were removed from power by United National Front (Afghanistan) ground forces and NATO special forces in late 2001, the Shura-e Nazar which more or less had already been replaced by the United Front, dissolved as an organization. Many of its members are still connected and organised within this political party (The National Coalition of Afghanistan).

== Berlin Statement ==
In January 2012, the National Front raised concerns about the possibility of a secretive and opaque deal between the US, Pakistan and the Taliban during a widely publicized meeting in Berlin. U.S. Congressman Louie Gohmert wrote, "These leaders who fought with embedded Special Forces to initially defeat the Taliban represent over 60-percent of the Afghan people, yet are being entirely disregarded by the Obama and Karzai Administrations in negotiations."

Ahmad Zia Massoud from the Tajik-dominated Jamiat-i Islami, Abdul Rashid Dostum, leader of the Uzbek-dominated Junbish-i Milli; Haji Mohammad Mohaqiq, a leader of the Hazara Hezb-e Wahdat and Amrullah Saleh, former director of the Afghan intelligence service NDS and leader of the newly formed Basij-e Milli (Afghanistan Green Trend) encompassing all ethnic groups, after the meeting with US congressmen in Berlin signed a joint declaration:

We call for a national dialogue on a revised Constitution to correct the inherent flaws in the present power structure by decentralizing the political system, making it more compatible with the diverse political, social and cultural nature of Afghanistan. The Afghan people deserve and need a parliamentary form of democracy instead of a personality-centered Presidential system.

We firmly believe that any negotiation with the Taliban can only be acceptable, and therefore effective, if all parties to the conflict are involved in the process. The present form of discussions with the Taliban is flawed, as it excludes anti-Taliban Afghans. It must be recalled that the Taliban extremists and their Al-Qaeda supporters were defeated by Afghans resisting extremism with minimal human embedded support from the United States and International community. The present negotiations with the Taliban fail to take into account the risks, sacrifices and legitimate interests of the Afghans who ended the brutal oppression of all Afghans.

If the Taliban are imposed on Afghanistan, there will be resistance.

In order to speed the withdrawal of international forces, the participants believe it is essential to strengthen regional and national institutions that are inclusive and represent the concerns of all the communities of Afghanistan. The participants favor a change in the Electoral System from a Single Non Transferable Vote System to a nationally accepted variant of the Proportional Representation system with equal opportunities for both independent candidates, the political parties, or tribal representatives. We also support the election of Governors and empowerment of provincial councils. Such elected Governors and provincial councils should also have authority for such things as creating budgets and generating revenue, overseeing police and healthcare, as well as establishing educational authority, if they so desire.

— National Front Berlin Statement, January 2012

The Asia Times writes:

This is the first time that the leadership of the Tajik, Uzbek and Hazara communities [of Afghanistan] has come to a common line of thinking ... In essence, the Northern Alliance is being resuscitated as a political entity. ... As the Northern Alliance groups see it, Pakistani strategy is to wait out the period between now and 2014 - the date set for the US troop withdrawal - and then regroup the Taliban and make a bid to capture power in Kabul. Their strong show of unity in Berlin suggests that they will not roll over and give way to an exclusive US-Taliban-Pakistan settlement being imposed on their nation.

== Countrywide political rallies ==
Besides incorporating the political parties of the involved leaders, the National Front works in coordination with different Afghan political parties. Among the major political parties that support or work in coordination with the National Front are the National Coalition of Afghanistan led by Abdullah Abdullah, the Basej-e Milli led by Amrullah Saleh, the Nangarhar Shura led by a Pashtun leadership council, the National Congress Party of Afghanistan led by Latif Pedram, and the main Jamiat-e Islami led by Balkh governor Ustad Atta Mohammad Noor.

The National Front has held major political rallies across different provinces in Afghanistan. These rallies were attended by thousands of Afghan citizens. Abdul Rashid Dostum speaking on one of these rallies said that the Taliban were establishing bases in the north of Afghanistan from which to mount attacks after the withdrawal of most international troops in 2014.

The National Front announced it would have a candidate running for the presidential elections in 2014 and emphasized the need for "a transparent and fair election".

== See also ==
- National Resistance Front of Afghanistan
- Ahmad Zia Massoud
- Haji Mohammad Mohaqiq
- Abdul Rashid Dostum
- Amrullah Saleh
- Ahmad Massoud
- Ahmad Shah Massoud
- Abdullah Abdullah
