= Sardar Mohammad Nadir Naeem =

Afghan politician

Personal details
- Born: 1965 (age 60–61) Afghanistan

Sardar Mohammad Nadir Naeem (Pashto: سردار محمد نادر نعیم) (born 1965) is a politician in Afghanistan, and a member of the former ruling Barakzai dynasty. He announced his candidacy in October 2013 to stand candidate in the 2014 Presidential elections. His running mates are Taj Mohammad Akbar and Azizullah Puya.

Naeem was born in 1965 in Afghanistan. He was the grandson of then King Mohammed Zahir Shah. Following the 1973 coup d'état, where Mohammed Daoud Khan overthrew the monarchy, Naeem moved to the United Kingdom. He returned to Afghanistan following the 2001 invasion and the fall of the Taliban government.

Following his return to Afghanistan he worked as a secretary to his grandfather, Mohammed Zahir Shah.

== Kabul Institute for Peace ==
Sardar Mohammad Nadir Naeem founded the Kabul Institute for Peace.

== See also ==
- Afghanistan
- Politics of Afghanistan
