= Chief Executive (Afghanistan) =

Senior position within the government of the Islamic Republic of Afghanistan

Chief Executive of the Islamic Republic of Afghanistan
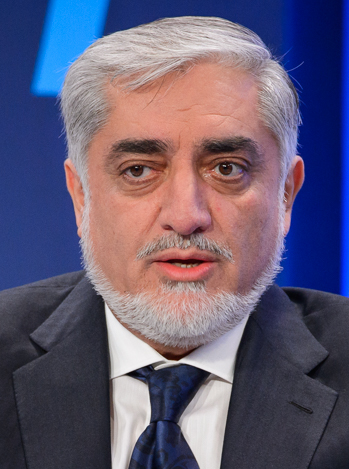
- Only officeholder Abdullah Abdullah; 29 September 2014– 11 March 2020
- Type: Head of government
- Appointer: National Unity Agreement
- Formation: 29 September 2014
- First holder: Abdullah Abdullah
- Final holder: Abdullah Abdullah
- Abolished: 11 March 2020 (de facto); 15 August 2021 (de jure)
- Succession: Prime Minister of Afghanistan

The chief executive of the Islamic Republic of Afghanistan was a position within the Government of Afghanistan that served as head of government of Afghanistan. The extra-constitutional post was created in September 2014 following the disputes that arose after the 2014 Afghan presidential election when both Ashraf Ghani and Abdullah Abdullah, who was the only one held that post, claimed victory in that election. As part of a National Unity Agreement, it was agreed that Ashraf Ghani would assume the presidency and a new post of chief executive of the Islamic Republic of Afghanistan would be created for Abdullah Abdullah.

After his claim as president, disputed with Ghani, this post had remained vacant from 2020 until the Taliban retook power in 2021 after the Islamic Republic collapsed.

== List of chief executive officers ==
No.	Image	Name (Birth–Death)	Took office	Left office	Time in office	Political Affiliation
1		Abdullah Abdullah (born 1960)	29 September 2014	11 March 2020	5 years, 164 days	National Coalition
1		Abdullah Abdullah (born 1960)	Previously served as the Minister of Foreign Affairs, from 2001 to 2005.			
Post Abolished (2020-Present)

== See also ==
- President of Afghanistan
- List of heads of state of Afghanistan
- Prime Minister of Afghanistan
