= Zalmai Rassoul =

Afghan politician

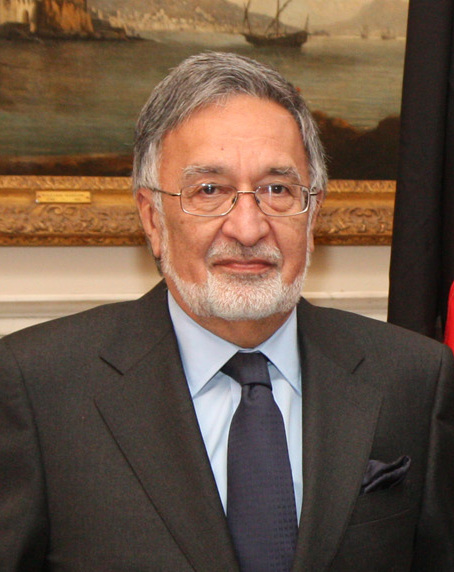

Ambassador of Afghanistan to the United Kingdom and Ireland in-exile
- In office 2020–2024
- President: Ashraf Ghani (until 2021)

Minister of Foreign Affairs
- In office 10 January 2010 – 5 October 2013
- President: Hamid Karzai
- Preceded by: Rangin Dadfar Spanta
- Succeeded by: Zarar Ahmad Osmani

National Security Advisor
- In office June 2002 – January 2010

Personal details
- Born: 11 May 1943 (age 83) Kabul, Kingdom of Afghanistan

Zalmai Rassoul (Pashto: زلمی رسول; born 11 May 1943) is an Afghan politician who served as Foreign Minister of Afghanistan from January 2010 to October 2013. He previously served as National Security Advisor from June 2002 to January 2010. Through his various roles in Government, Rassoul played a key role in building the Afghan security architecture, uniting the international community in support of an Afghan-led and Afghan-owned peace process, strengthening regional cooperation and security through the establishment of the Regional Economic Cooperation Conference on Afghanistan and the Heart of Asia-Istanbul Process, and rebuilding vital industries. He stood as a candidate in the 2014 presidential election. Later, Rassoul was appointed as the Ambassador of Afghanistan to the United Kingdom and Ireland from 2020 to 2024.

== Early life ==
Rassoul was born on 11 May 1943 in Kabul, Afghanistan. He is the nephew of Amānullāh Khān, the King of Afghanistan from 1919–1929. He attended Lycée Esteqlal where he graduated as the valedictorian. Subsequently, he studied at the Paris Medical School in France on a scholarship and received his M.D. in 1973.

He is an ethnic Pashtun, belonging to Barakzai (Mohammadzai) tribe (of the Zirak branch of the Durrani Confederacy). He is fluent in Pashto, Dari Persian, French, English, and Italian and has a working knowledge of Arabic.

He has over 30 publications in European and American medical journals and is a member of the American Society of Nephrology.

== Career ==
Rassoul has a vast experience in diplomacy, international affairs, governance and political activities. He has been deeply active for several decades in the political struggle for the rights of the Afghan people to live in peace and decide their future in accordance with their free will through democratic processes.

In 1998, Rassoul worked as the Director of the Secretariat of His Majesty Mohammad Zaher Shah – the former King of Afghanistan. In this role, he devoted his full attention to the convening of an Emergency Loya Jirga (Grand Assembly) – an initiative by the former King which aimed at achieving a political settlement to the decades-long war in the country.

Under Rassoul's leadership, the Secretariat in Rome played a key role in the future political transition of Afghanistan. Prior to the Bonn Conference, Zahir Shah dispatched numerous delegations to world capitals, Afghanistan's neighbors, and Afghanistan itself to build support for the convening of the Emergency Loya Jirga.

Rassoul accompanied President Hamid Karzai, at that time a leading member of the Executive Committee of the Loya Jirga, on these missions. Rassoul was suited for this work because of his long term, close contact with Afghan resistance and his 1980 founding and publishing of the monthly publication Afghan Reality created to increase awareness and be a voice of information from inside Afghanistan to the international community regarding the plight of the Afghan people.

Rassoul later served as a delegate to the historic December 2001 Bonn Conference. Following the Bonn Conference, he returned to Kabul to take part at the inauguration of the Afghan Interim Administration.

Rassoul was nominated by President Hamid Karzai as Minister of Civil Aviation and unanimously approved by the Cabinet in March 2002. Under his leadership, Afghanistan's aviation sector was revived after many years of United Nations sanctions against the Taliban and Afghanistan. Rassoul played an important role in Afghanistan's readmission to the International Air Transport Association (IATA) and the International Civil Aviation Organization (ICAO).

== 2014 presidential election ==
On 5 October 2013 Rassoul resigned from his position as Foreign Minister and on 6 October he officially filed his nomination to stand as a candidate in the 2014 presidential election, which he lost to Hamid Karzai His running mate was Ahmad Zia Massoud. He initially stood again in the 2019 Presidential election, but later withdrew in favor of President Ghani's candidacy.

== Exile ==
Rassoul was the Afghan ambassador to the United Kingdom when the Taliban returned to power in 2021. As the Taliban regime was not recognised by the UK, Rassoul remained in his position as ambassador until the embassy in London closed down on 27 September 2024 following what Rassoul called an "official request" by the Foreign Commonwealth and Development Office. However, the FCO said that the decision to close the embassy was made by the "State of Afghanistan".

== See also ==
- Cabinet of Ministers
- Ministry of Foreign Affairs (Afghanistan)
- Politics of Afghanistan

Political offices
Preceded by Rangin Dadfar Spanta	Minister of Foreign Affairs; 2010–2013	Succeeded by Zarar Ahmad Osmani
