= People's Islamic Unity Party of Afghanistan =

Islamic political party in Afghanistan

People's Islamic Unity Party of Afghanistan حزب وحدت اسلامی مردم افغانستان
- Leader: Mohammad Mohaqiq
- Founder: Mohammad Mohaqiq
- Founded: 2004
- Split from: Hezbe Wahdat
- Headquarters: Kabul
- Ideology: Shia Islamism; Hazara nationalism
- National affiliation: National Front of Afghanistan
- Colours: Red, Blue

Party flag

Website
- Facebook page

People's Islamic Unity Party of Afghanistan (Dari: حزب وحدت اسلامی مردم افغانستان, Hezb-e Wahdat Islami Mardum-e Afghanistan) is a political party in Afghanistan, formed after a split in the Hezbe Wahdat. The party is led by Mohammed Mohaqiq.

The party was founded in 2004 after Mohaqiq resigned from his post as Minister of Planning in the Afghan government. After resigning from both his government position and Hezbe Wahdat Mohaqiq announced both the creation of the party and also his candidacy for the 2004 Presidential election. Despite having just founded the PIUPA, Mohaqiq ran as an independent candidate on a Hazara nationalist platform. Like many of the other candidates, Mohaqiq's campaign emphasized an "everyman" image, and claimed that he would fight for the people's interests. Despite Karim Khalili, the head of Hezbe Wahdat, running as vice president on President Karzai's ticket Mohaqiq, won the bulk of the Hazara vote.

Mohaqiq and the party opposed the 2009 Personal Status Law, which allowed a man to refuse sustenance to his wife if she refused to have sex with him.

== See also ==
- List of Islamic political parties
- Hezbe Wahdat
