= Khyal Mohammad Mohammad Khan =

Afghan politician

First Deputy Chief Executive of Afghanistan
- In office 13 October 2014 – 19 February 2020 Serving with Muhammad Mohaqiq (till Jan 2019)
- Chief Executive: Abdullah Abdullah
- Preceded by: Position established
- Succeeded by: Position abolished

Personal details
- Born: 1957 (age 68–69) Ghazni Province, Kingdom of Afghanistan

Mohammad Mohammad Khan is an Afghan politician who served as Deputy Chief Executive Officer of Afghanistan. He was elected to represent Ghazni Province in Afghanistan's Wolesi Jirga, the lower house of its National Legislature, in 2005. He is a member of the Pashtun ethnic group. Khan has been one of the senior most party leaders and served in high ranks of the party Hezbi Islami and also run during 2014 presidential election as first vice president candidate with Abdullah Abdullah.

As a result of the establishment of the National Unity Government Abdullah become Chief Executive Officer of Afghanistan and Eng, Mohammad Khan being his first Deputy CEO. Eng. Mohammad Khan in his capacity as Deputy CEO is member of the National Security Council, Cabinet, Council of Ministers, Economic Council and actively contribute to all these strategic level decision making bodies on national level. As his share in the National Unity Government, Mohammad Khan received two ministries (Justice and MRRD); both ministers are nominees of Mohammad Khan.

Beside his role as Deputy CEO in the Government he is also Deputy Leader of his party, Hizb-e-islami Afghanistan, under the leadership of ex-Economy Minister Arghandiwal. Hizb-e-Islami is the only party in Afghanistan that has active offices in all 34 provinces of Afghanistan and have followers in all ethnic groups and regions of the country. While considered a Pashtoon-dominated party, it has equal participation from all other ethnic groups. During Afghan's resistance against the USSR HIA remained the biggest military force opposing Russian invasion with 60% share in the resistance. HIA remained close to Pakistan during the 1980s but has always been considered an anti-Iranian force in Afghanistan contrary to its political rival, Jamiat or the Northern Alliance, who remained close to Iran. During Afghan Resistance this party maintained very close relations with Sunnis in Iran and have always criticized Iranian regime for its negative behavior towards Sunnis. They maintain a heavy presence in the provinces bordering Iran and have active links to Pashtoon and Baloch tribes living on the other side of the border.
