= Faramarz Tamanna =

University professor and Afghan politician

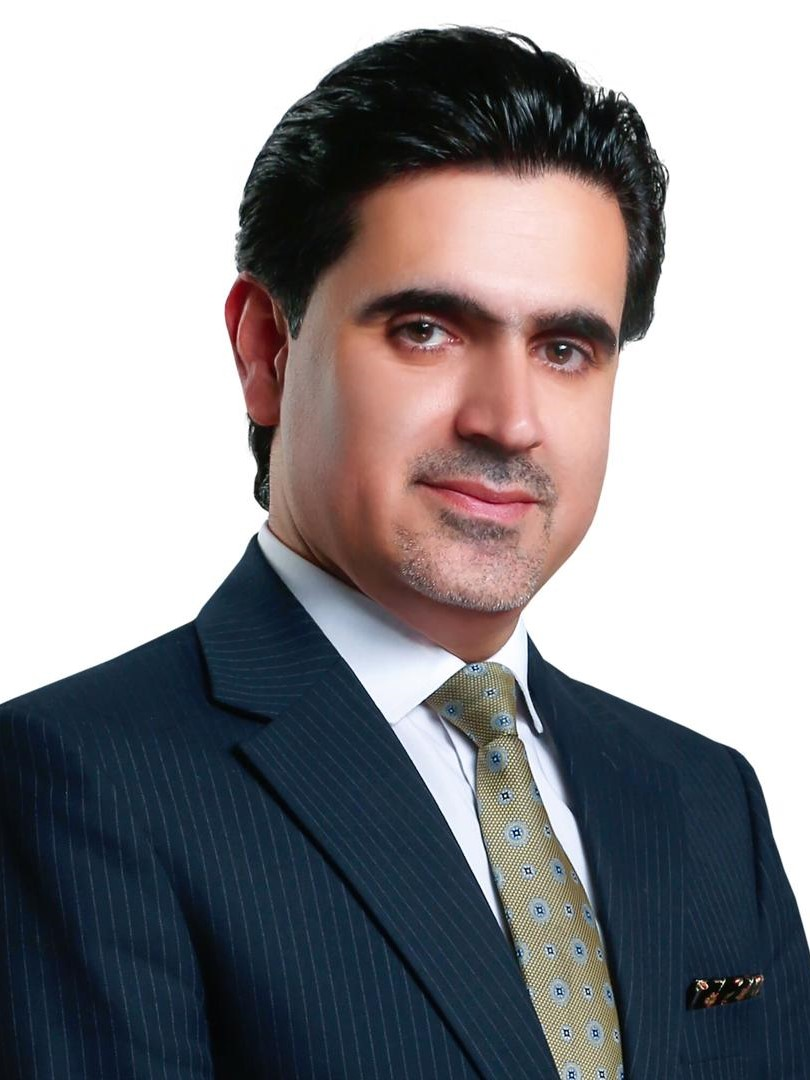
- Born: Herat, Afghanistan
- Website: faramarztamanna.af

Dr. Faramarz Tamanna (Persian: فرامرز تمنا, born in Herat, Afghanistan) is a postdoctoral fellow and visiting professor at the University of Ottawa. He is also a writer, an Afghan politician and the chancellor of the University of Afghanistan in Kabul. He was director general of the Center for Strategic Studies of the Ministry of Foreign Affairs (Afghanistan). He holds a PhD from Jawaharlal Nehru University (New Delhi, India) in International Studies.

Before being a presidential candidate, Tamanna worked as the director general of the Centre for Strategic Studies of the Afghan Ministry of Foreign Affairs. Before that, was the deputy spokesperson at this ministry. He has held other positions in Afghan diplomatic missions, including Economic Cooperation Organization (ECO) abroad. He has also taught at several universities.

Tamanna also registered as a candidate for the 2019 Afghan presidential elections. Tamanna finished fifth in the elections. His campaign slogan was "Wisdom and Development". He gave a series of television interviews.

He is the author of five books (Afghanistan's Foreign Policy on Regional Cooperation, US Foreign Policy towards Afghanistan, Afghanistan's Peace and Security Dilemma, Political Development in Afghanistan, and Foreign Policy of Afghanistan: Dynamism, Scope and Actions) and tens of articles covering security and international relations.

== Education ==
Faramarz is a postdoctoral fellow at the University of Ottawa. He earned his PhD in international Studies from Jawaharlal Nehru University, India in November 2014. He took his MA in International Relations from Shahid Beheshti University, Tehran.
