= Haji Muhammad Muhaqiq =

Afghan politician

Muhammad Mohaqiq محمد محقق
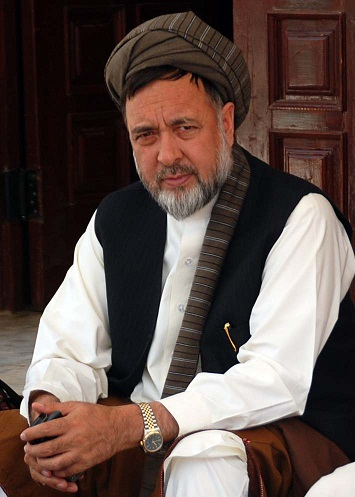
- Haji Muhammad Mohaqiq in May 2010, sitting by the Afghanistan Parliament door during protest against invasion of Kuchis in Hazarajat

Deputy Chief Executive of Afghanistan
- In office 13 October 2014 – 24 January 2019 Serving with Mohammad Khan Rahmani
- Chief Executive: Abdullah Abdullah
- Preceded by: Position established
- Succeeded by: Dissolved

Minister of Interior
- In office 1996–?
- President: Burhanuddin Rabbani

Leader of PIUPA
- Incumbent
- Assumed office 15 January 2006
- Preceded by: Position established

Personal details
- Born: 26 July 1955 (age 71) Mazar-e-Sharif, Balkh, Kingdom of Afghanistan
- Party: Hezbe Wahdat (1990–2006); PIUPA (since 2006)
- Other political affiliations: Junbish-i Milli (1990s)
- Children: 23
- Occupation: Politician, former Mujahideen leader

Haji Muhammad Mohaqiq (Hazaragi/Dari: حاجی محمد محقق; born 26 July 1955 in Balkh) is an Afghan politician who served as a member of the Afghanistan Parliament. He is also the founder and chairman of the People's Islamic Unity Party of Afghanistan. During the 1980s, he served with the mujahideen rebel forces fighting against the Soviet-backed Afghan government during the Soviet-Afghan War. After the withdrawal of the Soviet Union in 1989, Mohaqiq was appointed as the leader of the Hezb-e Wahdat for northern Afghanistan.

== Early years ==
Muhammad Mohaqiq son of Sarwar, was born in 1955 and hails from Mazar-e-Sharif in Balkh Province. He is an ethnic Hazara. He holds a bachelor's degree in Islamic studies from Iran. Mohaqiq speaks Persian, Uzbek and Arabic. He has been involved in Mujahideen activities after the April 1978 Saur Revolution.

== Political career ==
During the Afghan civil war in the early 1990s, he was regarded as a prominent leader fighting for his Hazara people. In the late 1990s, Mohaqiq joined the Northern Alliance (United Front) in their resistance and struggle against the Islamic Emirate of Afghanistan (Taliban). After the fall of the Taliban, he was appointed as the Vice President and the Minister of Planning in the interim government of Hamid Karzai.

Mohaqiq ran as a candidate in the 2004 Afghan presidential election. He came in third place with 11.7% of the votes after Hamid Karzai and Yunus Qanuni.

A January 2009 article by Ahmad Majidyar of the American Enterprise Institute included Mohaqiq on a list of fifteen possible candidates in the 2009 Afghan presidential election. In the end, however, Mohaqiq opted to support President Karzai against his main challenger Abdullah Abdullah in the election.

In 2010, Mohaqiq stopped supporting President Karzai because of Karzai's policy of appeasement towards the Taliban insurgents. In late 2011, Mohaqiq, Ahmad Zia Massoud and Abdul Rashid Dostum created the National Front of Afghanistan (also Afghanistan National Front, ANF).

From 2014 until 2019 he served as the second deputy of the chief executive Abdullah Abdullah, at the end of January 2019 he was dismissed by the president Ashraf Ghani under the Article 13 Item 64 of the National constitute of Afghanistan. But later he refused his dismissal and continued attending Official meetings with Dr. Abdullah Abdullah. During the 2019 presidential election, he was the second deputy of Hanif Atmar under the ticket Truth and Justice (Afghanistan) and then left the ticket and joined Abdullah Abdullah.

== See also ==
- People's Islamic Unity Party of Afghanistan
