= Asadullah Saadati =

Hazara politician (born 1974)

Asadullah Sa'adati اسدالله سعادتی
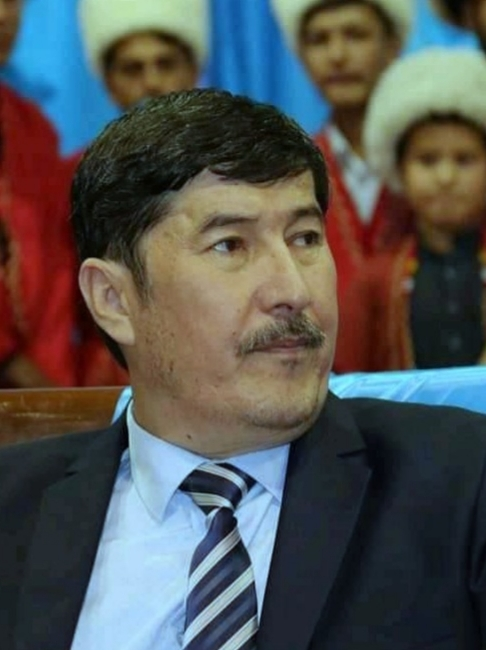

Afghanistan Parliament

Personal details
- Born: 1974 (age 51–52) Shahristan, Daykundi, Afghanistan
- Party: Hezbe Wahdat
- Occupation: Politician
- Ethnicity: Hazaras

Asadullah Sa'adati (Dari: اسدالله سعادتی) is an ethnic Hazara politician in Afghanistan. He is the former representative of this province during the 16th term of the Afghanistan Parliament.

== Early life ==
Asadullah Saadati was born on 2 April 1974 in Shahristan District of Daykundi province. He completed his school education in his city in Daikundi and obtained a bachelor's degree in (Dari-Persian) language from Kabul University in 2005.

== See also ==
- List of Hazara people
