= Independent Election Commission (Afghanistan) =

Independent Election Commission of Afghanistan
Agency overview
- Formed: 2006
- Dissolved: 2021
- Jurisdiction: Afghanistan
- Agency executives: Najeebullah Ahmadza, Chair; Ziaul Haq Amarkhel, Secretary
- Website: www.iec.org.af

The Independent Election Commission of Afghanistan (IEC) was the national electoral commission of Afghanistan, which was responsible for administering and supervising elections and referendums under the 2004 Constitution of Afghanistan.

The commission was established in 2006. It was dissolved by the Taliban regime in December 2021.

In March 2014, the commission's headquarters were attacked by the Taliban.
