= Atta Muhammad Nur =

Afghan politician

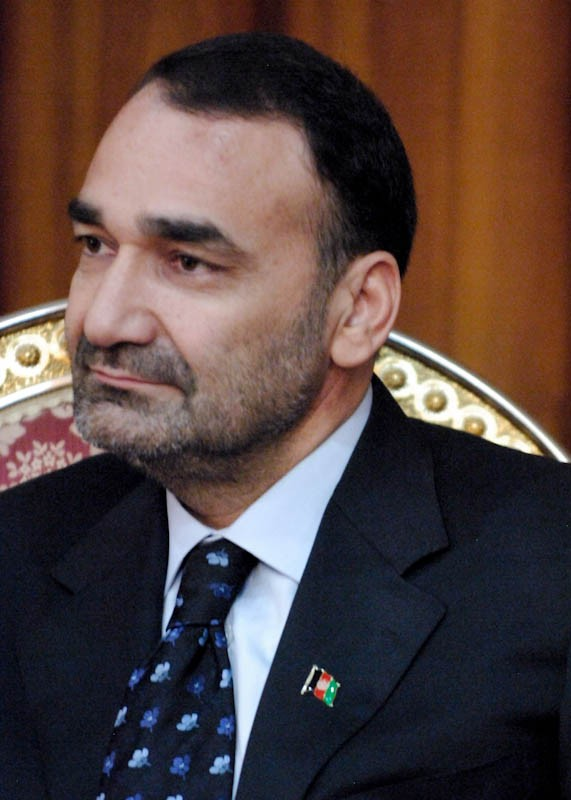
- Nur in 2010

Governor of Balkh
- In office 2004 – January 25, 2018
- Preceded by: Mustafa Omari
- Succeeded by: Mohammad Ishaq Rahgozar

Personal details
- Born: 1964 (age 61–62) Mazar-i-Sharif, Balkh Province, Kingdom of Afghanistan
- Party: Jamiat-e Islami
- Relations: Islam
- Children: 7
- Profession: Politician, former Mujahideen leader
- Ethnicity: Tajik

Attā Muhammad Nur (also spelled Atā Mohammed Noor; Dari: عطا محمد نور; born 1964) is an Afghan exiled politician and former mujahideen leader who served as the Governor of Balkh Province in Afghanistan from 2004 to January 25, 2018. An ethnic Tajik, he worked to educate the Mujahideen after during the Soviet-Afghan War, gaining the nickname "The Teacher". He then became a mujahideen resistance commander for the Jamiat-e Islami against the Soviets.

When the Taliban government took power in late 1996, Noor served as a commander in the Northern Alliance under Ahmad Shāh Massoud against the Taliban and led operations in the Balkh area. In 2004, President Hamid Karzai appointed him as the governor of Balkh province. He has been described by The Economist as being "immensely wealthy." He was removed from the position of Provincial Governor by President Ashraf Ghani in January 2018.

During the 2021 Taliban offensive, Nur, along with Abdul Rashid Dostum, fled Mazar-e-Sharif to Uzbekistan in August 2021.

== Early life ==
Attā Muhammad Nur, was born in 1964 in Mazar-e-Sharif city of Balkh province.

=== Mujahideen and Northern Alliance ===
Attā Muhammad Nur joined the mujahideen fighting the Soviet presence in Afghanistan in the 1980s and became affiliated with the Jamiat-e Islami party. By 1992, he had become one of the most powerful Mujahideen commanders in Northern Afghanistan.

Following the fall of Mohammed Najibullah's Democratic Republic of Afghanistan, while remaining a Jamiat commander, he also joined Abdul Rashid Dostum's National Islamic Movement of Afghanistan, becoming a deputy leader of that movement during its first congress on June 1, 1992. However, ideological differences with Dostum soon emerged, and in 1993, he split from Dostum. In January 1994, Atta Noor fought to consolidate the Islamic State of Afghanistan's control over the capital of Balkh, Mazar-i-Sharif, against Dostum's Junbish militia. But Dostum struck first, mobilizing 10,000 men and defeating Atta's forces.

When the Taliban took power in late 1997, Attā Noor served as a commander in the anti-Taliban United Front (Northern Alliance) under Ahmad Shāh Massoud. Attā Noor led operations in the Balkh area. Dostum had turned into an ally against the Taliban. On November 9, 2001, Attā Noor's forces and those of Dostum drove the Taliban from Mazar-i-Sharif.

== Islamic Republic ==
After the establishment of the Islamic Republic of Afghanistan under the Hamid Karzai administration, Ustād Attā's forces clashed with those of Dostum several times. From 2002 onwards, with the support of Jamiat-e Islāmi allies occupying key positions in the Afghan Transitional Administration and the support of the international community which tried to marginalize Dostum for his dubious record, Attā Noor expanded his influence in Northern Afghanistan. He managed to seize Mazar-i-Sharif using little force, only the Khulmi District was taken by force. Attā subsequently attempted to buy the loyalty of local leaders in Faryab, Jowzjan, and Balkh provinces. In October 2003, Dostum launched an offensive, and managed to retake many of the positions he had lost since 2002. Near Mazar, Dostum outmanoeuvred Attā's armoured forces, and captured all the key positions around the city. The fighting initiated by Dostum around Mazar involved tanks and artillery, and resulted in the death of approximately 60 people. Both Dostum and Atta were, however, coming under increasing pressure from the international community and the central government in Kabul to stop the fighting. Attā and Dostum worked out a power-sharing agreement in which Dostum conceded Mazar and most of Balkh province to Attā, who in turn renounced his intention of contesting Dostum's influence elsewhere in Northern Afghanistan.

Noor has married once and has five sons and two daughters. His eldest son, Khālid Noor, graduated from Royal Military Academy Sandhurst of London in 2014. Tariq Noor is studying Public Administration at the American University in Dubai. His other children are Belal Noor, Suhaib Noor, and Seyar Noor.

=== Governor of Balkh province ===
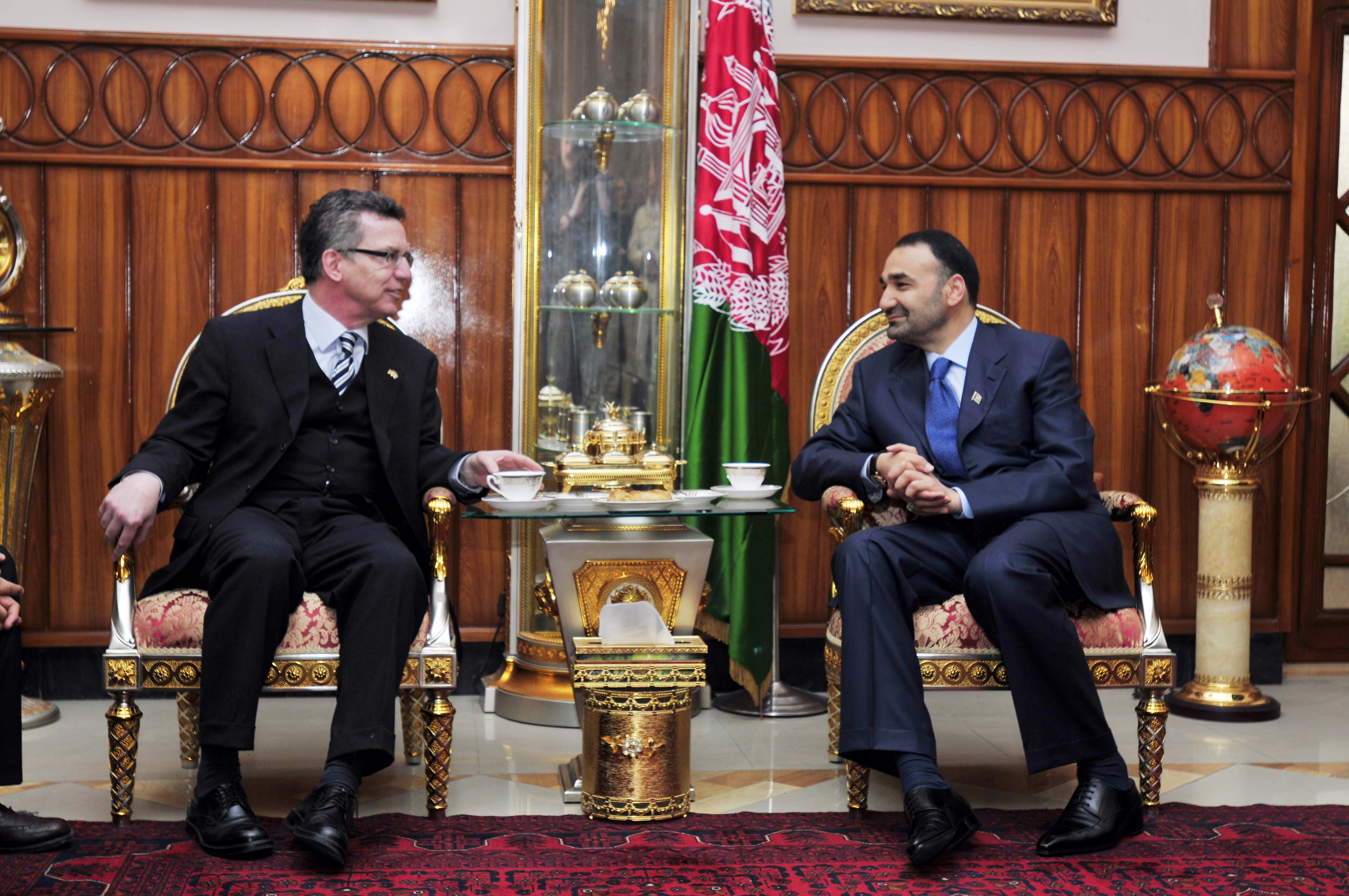
A special meeting between German Minister of the Interior Thomas de Maizière and Attā Mohammad in March 2010

In Late 2004, Attā was appointed governor of Balkh Province by Hamid Karzai. By installing commanders with whom he had fought in the 1980s and 1990s in local government positions, thus turning them away from destabilizing activities, he created a loyal and disciplined local administration. As a result, he acquired a monopoly on violence, and achieved relative security and stability even in the most remote districts, at the cost of authoritarian methods. The security in Balkh Province permitted significant reconstruction and the development of considerable economic activity. Attā Noor is credited for maintaining political control and economic development and security for Balkh province including its largest city, Mazar-i-Sharif. Attā's opium poppy eradication program between 2005 and 2007, advised by consultants from Adam Smith International, successfully reduced poppy cultivation in Balkh Province from 7,200 hectares in 2005 to zero by 2007.

Governor Attā Mohammad Noor supported Karzai's main challenger, Abdullah Abdullah, in the August 2009 presidential election.

Attā Mohammad Noor, was widely recognized as the main source of political power in the Province, and had exercised a high degree of control over politics in Balkh. He has used that influence to grow rich through business deals during his time in power. No meaningful business in the Province was Transacted without his approval and major real estate in the provincial capital, Mazar-e Sharif, was in the hands of companies Attā owns or controls. He is a key player in the transport industry in Afghanistan's north, including the development of the rail line from Uzbekistan to Mazar-e Sharif. Having transplanted his militia leaders into powerful positions throughout the provincial administration, he maintains a monopoly over violence as well as control over illicit activity. Attā exercises near-complete control over the security organizations and political operations of the Province.

Nationally, the Province's administration was well regarded. Consequently, it received additional funding and positions through the civil service priority restructuring program and some payments from the Ministry of Counter-Narcotics through the U.S.-funded Good Performance Initiative. Historically, his local political strategy has been to dominate the Province using informal power, rules, and networks. His reputation as a strongman who doesn't tolerate opposition in any form has made him very influential in the area. While his power base does not lend itself to a rule based democracy, given Afghanistan's history of weak central power and its limited resources, the form of governance represented by Attā may be the best compromise at present in Afghanistan.

Opponents of Atta view him as a corrupt power figure whose loyalty from the populace is motivated more by fear than adoration. The President appoints the country's 34 governors, but many believed that President Karzai was too weak to remove Governor Atta. Karzai's opposition raised concerns of violence and rebellion from the populace if the central government were to attempt to reign in Atta's power. Governor Attā Mohammad Noor himself boldly asserts that he will decide whether he remains governor of Balkh Province, not Kabul. Indeed, in 2014 the current Afghan president, Ashraf Ghani, fired all 34 Afghan provincial governors, but Atta repeatedly refused to give up the role. He was removed from the position of Provincial Governor by President Ashraf Ghani in January 2018.

Although largely supported by the U.S., Atta has publicly spoken out against the U.S. exit strategy from Afghanistan. Attā is vehemently opposed to bringing the Taliban back into negotiations and opposes reconciliation with his former archenemies. Additionally, Attā does not support any permanent American bases in Afghanistan, and reiterates his regional loyalty. Speculation exists that Attā's colorful rhetoric may be linked to the possibility of him running for president, or at the least seeking the leadership of his local political party.

He and Dostum fled across the Amu Darya when the Taliban advanced on to Mazar-i-Sharif on August 14, 2021. In October 2021, Ata, Dostum, and others including Yunus Qanuni and Abdul Rasul Sayyaf formed the Supreme Council of National Resistance of the Islamic Republic of Afghanistan in opposition to the new Taliban regime.

== See also ==
- Ahmad Massoud
- Hasib Qoway Markaz

Preceded by Mohammad Eshaq Rahgozar	Governor of Balkh; 2004–2018	Succeeded by Mohammad Ishaq Rahguzar
