= Abdullah Abdullah =

Afghan politician (born 1960)

- عبدالله عبدالله
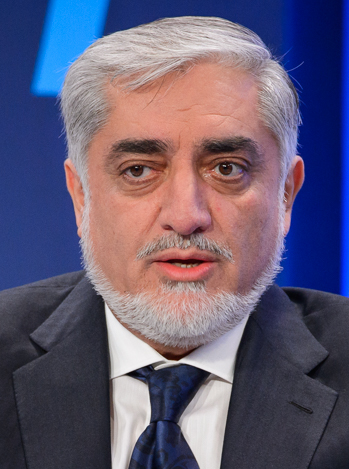
- Abdullah in 2017

Chairman of the High Council for National Reconciliation
- In office 30 May 2020 – 15 August 2021
- President: Ashraf Ghani
- Preceded by: Office established
- Succeeded by: Office abolished

Chief Executive of Afghanistan
- In office 29 September 2014 – 9 March 2020
- President: Ashraf Ghani
- Deputy: Khyal Mohammad Mohammad Khan; Mohammad Mohaqiq
- Preceded by: Position established
- Succeeded by: Position abolished

Minister of Foreign Affairs
- In office 13 November 2001 – 20 April 2005
- President: Hamid Karzai
- Preceded by: Abdul Rahim Ghafoorzai
- Succeeded by: Rangin Dadfar Spanta

Leader of the National Coalition of Afghanistan
- In office 18 March 2010 – 15 August 2021
- Preceded by: Position established
- Succeeded by: Position abolished

Personal details
- Born: Abdullah; 10 February 1960 (age 66) Kārte Parwān, Kabul, Kingdom of Afghanistan
- Party: National Coalition of Afghanistan (1996–2021)
- Spouse: Fakhria Abdullah (m. 1993)
- Children: 4
- Education: Kabul University (Bachelor of Medicine, Bachelor of Surgery)

Abdullah Abdullah (Pashto (Note: Pashto pronunciation: [ʔab.du'lɑ ʔab.du'lɑ]); Dari (Note: Dari pronunciation: [ʔab.dʊl.lɑː ʔab.dʊl.lɑː]): عبدالله عبدالله, born Abdullah; 10 February 1960) is an Afghan politician who led the High Council for National Reconciliation (HCNR) from May 2020 until August 2021, when the Afghan government was overthrown by the Taliban. The council had been established to facilitate peace talks between the Islamic Republic of Afghanistan and the Taliban insurgents. Abdullah was the Chief Executive of Afghanistan from September 2014 to March 2020, and as Minister of Foreign Affairs from December 2001 to April 2005. Prior to that, he was a senior member of the Northern Alliance, working as an adviser to Ahmad Shah Massoud. He worked as an ophthalmologist and medical doctor in the 1980s.

Abdullah ran against President Hamid Karzai in the 2009 Afghan presidential election, coming second with 30.5% of the total votes. In 2010, he created the Coalition for Change and Hope which became the National Coalition of Afghanistan in 2011 and is one of the leading democratic opposition movements in Afghanistan. He ran again in the 2014 presidential election and went to the second round with 45% the total vote. His closest rival, Ashraf Ghani, had secured 35% of the total vote. Due to signs of fraud, the results of the second round were heavily contested and led to a deadlock. Despite the controversy regarding the results of the second round of elections, the final certified result by the Independent election commission of Afghanistan shows that Ashraf Ghani received 55.3% of the votes while Abdullah Abdullah secured 44.7% of the vote. After months of talks and US mediation, the two candidates established a national unity government in which Abdullah was the Chief Executive of Afghanistan.

Following the collapse of the Islamic Republic of Afghanistan on 17 August 2021, leader of the Taliban-affiliated Hezb-e-Islami party Gulbuddin Hekmatyar met with Abdullah and Karzai in Doha, seeking to form a government. Reports emerged on 25 August that a 12-member council will be formed to govern the de facto newly reinstated Afghanistan. Reportedly 7 members were already agreed upon: Abdullah himself, Karzai, Hekmatyar, Abdul Ghani Baradar, Mullah Yaqoob, Khalil-ur-Rehman Haqqani, and Haneef Atmar. However, it was later announced that Abdullah Abdullah and Karzai had failed to secure roles in the new government.

== Early life ==
Abdullah was born in the second district of Kārte Parwān in Kabul, Afghanistan. He is the son of a Pashtun father, Ghulam Mahyyoddin Zmaryalay, from the Kandahar area, and a Tajik mother from Panjshir. His early years were split between living in Panjshir Province, Kandahar and Kabul, where his father was an administrator in the land survey, and subsequently the audit section of the Prime Minister's office. His father was a senator during the final years of King Zahir Shah's rule. Abdullah has seven sisters and two brothers. His nephew was journalist Muhammad Fahim Dashti, who was the spokesman for the National Resistance Front (NRF) during the Republican insurgency in Afghanistan.

Until he became a government minister, Abdullah had only a first name; demands from Western newspaper editors for a family name led him to adopt the full name "Abdullah Abdullah". Abdullah is married, and has three daughters and a son.

== Education and medical career ==
Abdullah graduated from Naderia High School in 1976. He studied ophthalmology at Kabul University's Department of Medicine, where he received an MBBS in 1983. After graduating, he worked for several months as a resident ophthalmologist at the National Organisation for Ophthalmic Rehabilitation (NOOR) hospital in Kabul. Then he moved to Pakistan, where he worked in the Syed Jamaluddin Afghan Eye Hospital for Afghan Refugees in Peshawar for more than a year.

== Early political career ==
In 1985, Abdullah returned to Afghanistan to join the resistance against the Soviet invasion of Afghanistan and made his way to Panjshir. In September, he became the head of the Health Department for the Panjshir Resistance Front, coordinating treatments and health care for the resistance fighters and the civilian population. He became a close associate and adviser to mujahideen commander Ahmad Shah Massoud.

After the fall of the communist government in 1992, the Peshawar Accord established the Islamic State of Afghanistan with a provisional government led by Burhanuddin Rabbani. Abdullah was appointed chief of staff and spokesperson of the Ministry of Defense.

On 27 September 1996, the Taliban seized power in Kabul and 90% of the country, with military training support by Pakistan, and established the Islamic Emirate of Afghanistan. Following the Taliban takeover of Kabul, the Northern Alliance, also called the United Islamic Front, was created under the leadership of Ahmad Shah Massoud. The Northern Alliance was supported by Russia, Iran and India. Abdullah became the United Front's Minister of Foreign Affairs. Islamic State of Afghanistan elements of the United Front, including the Defense Minister Ahmad Shah Massoud and the Foreign Minister Abdullah Abdullah, remained Afghanistan's internationally recognized government. The Taliban government was recognized by only three countries – Saudi Arabia, Pakistan, and the United Arab Emirates.

In early 2001, Abdullah traveled with Ahmad Shah Massoud to Brussels, where Massoud addressed the European Parliament asking the international community to provide humanitarian help to the people of Afghanistan. Abdullah translated when Massoud stated that the Taliban and al-Qaeda had introduced "a very wrong perception of Islam" and that without the support of Pakistan and Bin Laden, the Taliban would not be able to sustain their military campaign for up to a year.

== Modern Afghanistan ==
=== Foreign ministry ===
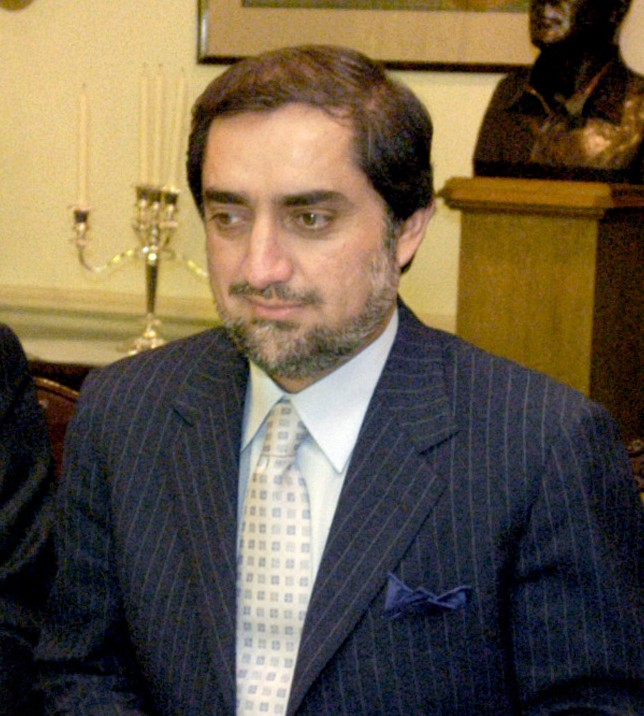
Abdullah in 2004

In October 2001 the Taliban regime was overthrown by Operation Enduring Freedom including American and United Front forces. As a result of the International Conference on Afghanistan in Bonn in 2001, Abdullah was appointed Minister of Foreign Affairs of the Interim Administration in December 2001.

In November 2001, a diplomatic crisis unfolded when the British government, without any forewarning or seeking permission from the Northern Alliance, flew members of the British Special Boat Service to Bagram. Abdullah was "apoplectic" as he considered the uninvited arrival to be a violation of sovereignty, and complained bitterly to the head of the Central Intelligence Agency field office, threatening to resign if the British did not withdraw. British Foreign Secretary Jack Straw tried to reassure the Northern Alliance that the deployment was not a vanguard of a British peacekeeping army, but Northern Alliance leaders did not believe them; with the threat of the Northern Alliance opening fire on incoming Royal Air Force troop transports, the deployment was put on hold.

Following the 2004 Afghan presidential election, Abdullah was one of the few people who kept their position from the Transitional Government and was re-appointed as Minister of Foreign Affairs for another year. In 2005 he resigned his position.

=== 2009 presidential election ===
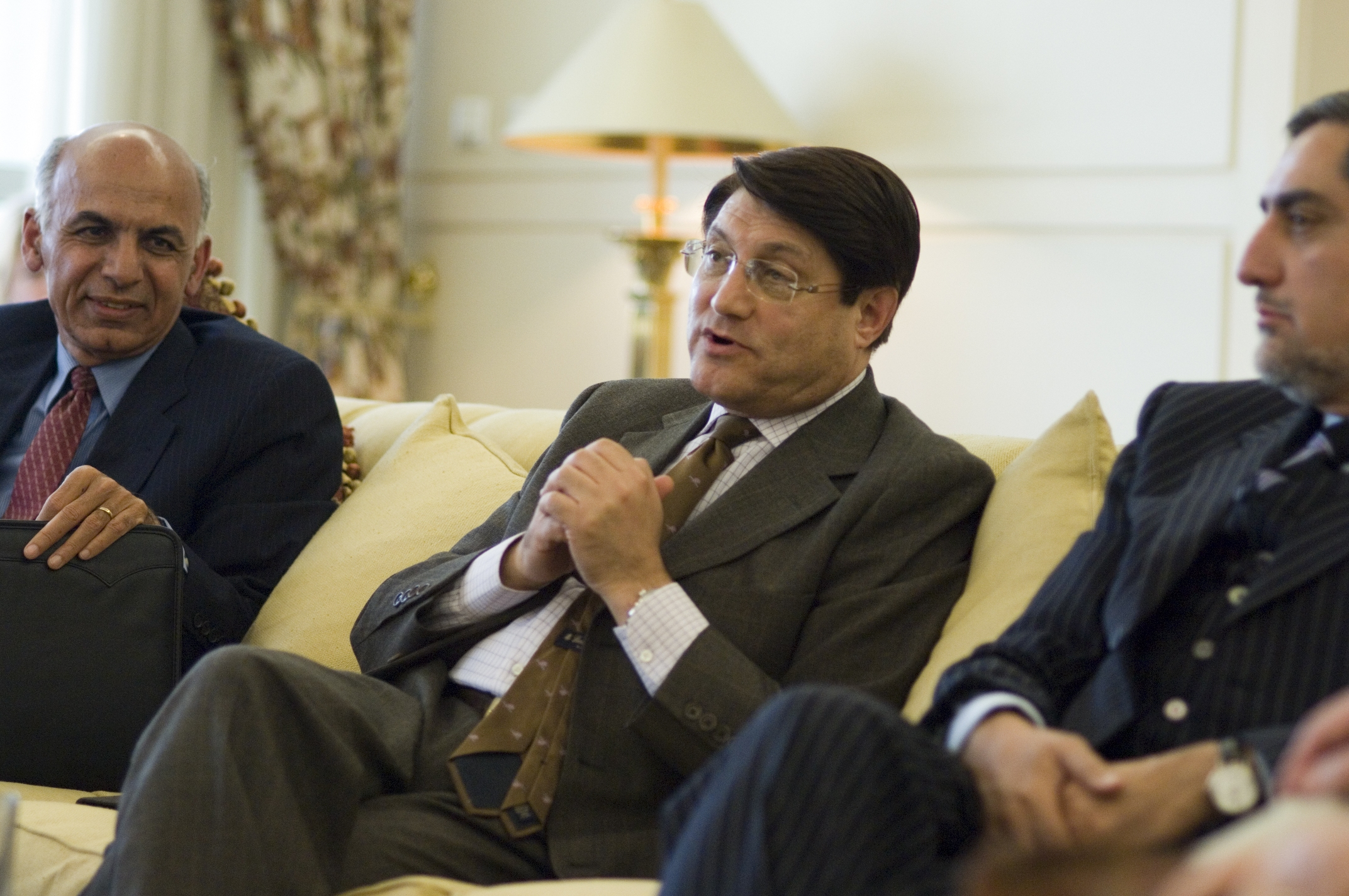
From left to right: Ashraf Ghani, Anwar ul-Haq Ahady, and Abdullah in April 2009

On 6 May 2009, Abdullah registered as an Independent candidate for the 2009 Afghan presidential election, running against incumbent president Hamid Karzai. Abdullah selected as his running mates Humayun Shah Asefi as his First Vice President and Dr. Cheragh Ali Cheragh (a surgeon from Kabul who is a practicing Shi'i Muslim) as Second Vice President. Afghanistan has an executive structure featuring two vice presidents, a First VP and a Second VP, to help ensure a stable government by attempting to provide ethnic and religious balance to senior government leadership positions. Unofficial and non-certified electoral results were announced during the day on 16 September 2009, showing that Abdullah was in second position with 27.8% of the total votes cast. President Karzai did not achieve the 50.01% vote majority required to avoid a runoff election. A large number of fraudulent ballots, mostly belonging to Karzai's camp, were disallowed by the Independent Afghan Electoral Commission. Karzai came under intense international political and diplomatic pressure from international leaders because of allegations of large-scale fraud. Hamid Karzai eventually agreed to participate in a designated head-to-head runoff election (held between the contenders with the two largest numbers of total votes in the first election) which was scheduled nationwide for 7 November 2009.

On 1 November 2009, Abdullah announced that he had decided to withdraw from the runoff election, citing his lack of faith in the President Karzai government's ability to hold a "fair and transparent" second election process. Subsequently, Hamid Karzai was declared the winner by the Afghan Electoral Commission (essentially winning by default).

=== National Coalition of Afghanistan ===
After the 2009 Afghan Presidential Elections, Abdullah created the Coalition for Change and Hope (CCH). The NCA presented the leading democratic opposition movement against the government of Hamid Karzai.

In the 18 September 2010 parliamentary election, the Coalition for Change and Hope won more than 90 seats out of 249 seats, becoming the main opposition party. As a result, it is assumed that the new Parliament will introduce some checks and balances on the Presidential power.

Regarding the Taliban insurgency and Karzai's strategy of negotiations Dr. Abdullah stated:

I should say that Taliban are not fighting in order to be accommodated. They are fighting in order to bring the state down. So it's a futile exercise, and it's just misleading. ... There are groups that will fight to the death. Whether we like to talk to them or we don't like to talk to them, they will continue to fight. So, for them, I don't think that we have a way forward with talks or negotiations or contacts or anything as such. Then we have to be prepared to tackle and deal with them militarily. In terms of the Taliban on the ground, there are lots of possibilities and opportunities that with the help of the people in different parts of the country, we can attract them to the peace process; provided, we create a favorable environment on this side of the line.

In December 2011, the National Coalition of Afghanistan, supported by dozens of Afghan political parties and led by Abdullah, was formed to challenge the government of President Hamid Karzai. Major figures associated with the coalition include Yunus Qanuni (the former head of the Afghan Parliament), Homayoon Shah-asefi (a former presidential candidate and leader of the monarchist party with ties to the family of former king Mohammed Zahir, Noorolhagh Oloumi (a senior political figure in the former Afghan communist government), Ahmad Wali Massoud (a younger brother of Ahmad Shah Massoud) and several current Members of Parliament.

=== Massoud Foundation ===
Abdullah has been the Secretary General of the Massoud Foundation since June 2006. The Massoud Foundation is an independent, non-aligned, non-profitable and non-political organization established by people who have been affected by the life of Massoud. It provides humanitarian assistance to Afghans especially in the fields of health care and education. It also runs programs in the fields of culture, construction, agriculture and welfare.

=== 2014 presidential candidacy ===
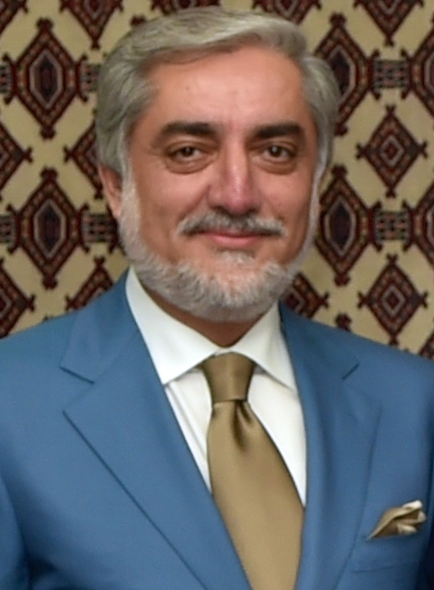
Abdullah in 2014

On 1 October 2013, Abdullah officially announced his nomination for the presidential election held on 5 April 2014. On 13 April, BBC News reported that the counting indicated that Abdullah had thus far received 44.65% of the vote, with Ashraf Ghani following behind with 33.6%. Abdullah and Ghani were then bound to compete in a run-off election in June 2014. The results of that election remained in dispute through until September 2014, with Abdullah claiming the government and the national electoral institutions manipulated the results. Pressure from the United States on the two candidates to resolve their differences, and to negotiate a power-sharing deal were initially agreed to, but Abdullah later remained defiant. A UN-led audit failed to sway Abdullah as he insisted the audit team could not explain a million extra votes counted in the run-off. Ghani supporters insisted they wanted to do a deal with Abdullah, and said they were leaving the door open to negotiations.

On 19 September, the Independent Election Commission (Afghanistan) announced Ghani the winner. Five hours later, Abdullah and Ghani signed a power-sharing agreement, with Ghani being named president and Abdullah taking on an important position in the government; the deal was signed in front of the presidential palace, with incumbent president Hamid Karzai in attendance. Part of the deal stipulated that the Independent Election Commission would not release the exact vote totals of the second round of voting.

=== Chief Executive (2014–2020) ===
Following a close loss to Ashraf Ghani in the second round of the 2014 election, Abdullah became Chief Executive, a newly created position that encompasses prime ministerial powers. As Chief Executive, Abdullah actively met with international business leaders and politicians alike, seeking foreign investment and support. He further sought to implement a number of ceasefires with the Taliban. Citing mistrust of the Taliban, Abdullah took a somewhat more hardline stance against the Taliban movement than his presidential counterpart Ashraf Ghani, noting a number of failed attempts at long-term peace. In April 2019, Abdullah opted not to attend the Consultative Peace Jirga, noting that the Jirga was unlikely to resolve any issues.

=== 2019 presidential election ===
Incumbent Chief Executive Abdullah Abdullah registered as a candidate for the 2019 presidential election. Abdullah selected Enayatullah Babur Farahmand as his First Vice President and Asadullah Sadati as Second Vice President.

After the election results showed that Ashraf Ghani was declared the winner, Abdullah declared himself the winner as well, sparking a political crisis and leading him to publicly state that he would form a parallel government. On 9 March 2020, both Abdullah and Ghani took the presidential oath of office at separate inauguration ceremonies. The United States pressured the Afghan government to come up with a solution by cutting $1 billion of aid. This, with mounting international pressure and the threat of the Taliban, forced officials to strike a deal between Abdullah and Ghani. The deal left President Ghani in charge of executive power and created the High Council of National Reconciliation. Abdullah is head of the council, where he will lead peace efforts with the Taliban.

=== High Council for National Reconciliation (2020–2021) ===
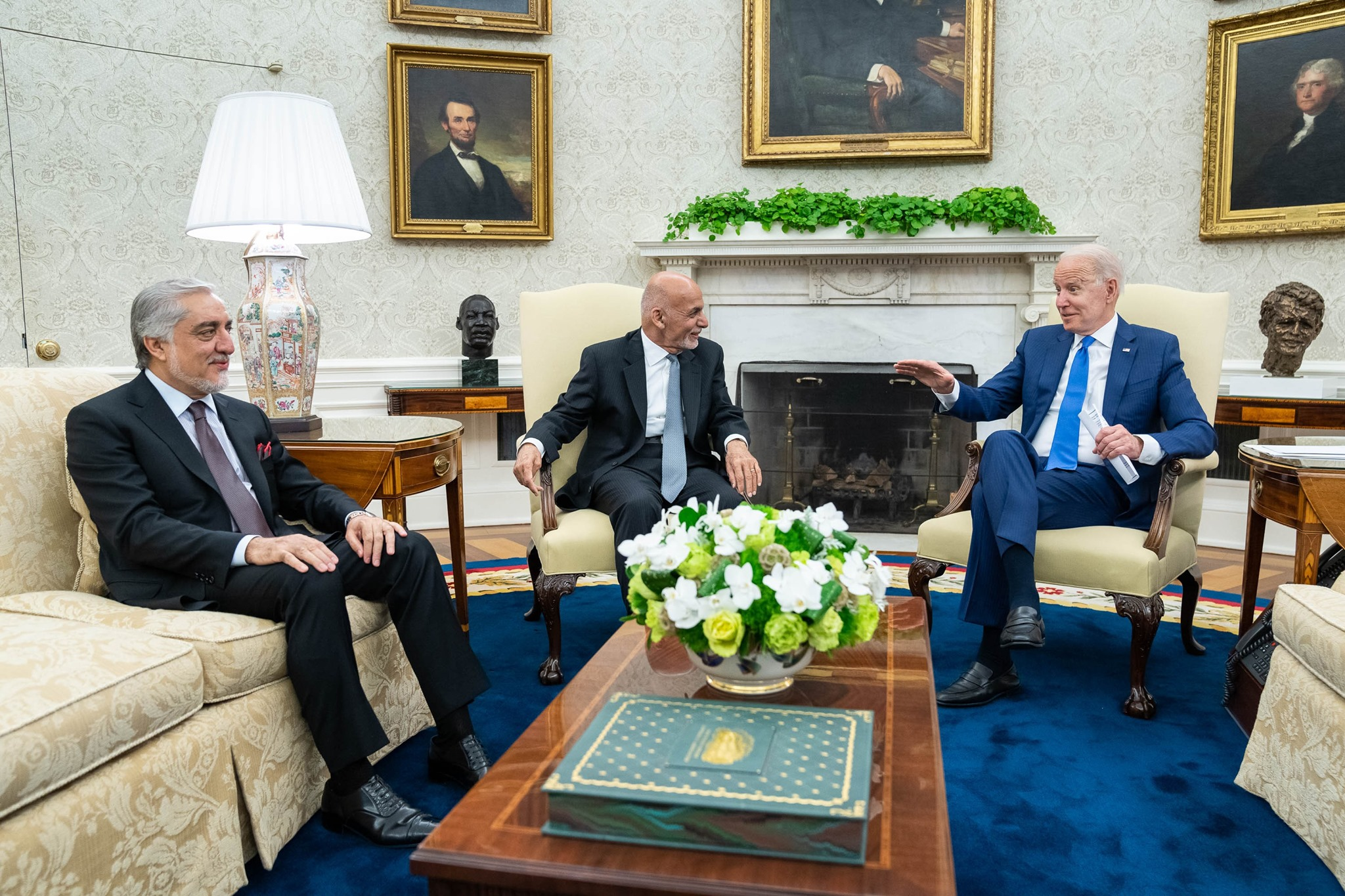
U.S. President Joe Biden meeting with Afghan President Ashraf Ghani and Abdullah Abdullah, 25 June 2021, two months before the fall of Kabul

On 17 May 2020, a deal was reached where Abdullah was to lead the country's High Council for National Reconciliation (HCNR) as a chairman. Moreover, HCNR was given the authority to handle and approve all affairs related to the Afghan peace process. The Council held its first meeting in December 2020, several months after its official creation, despite having incomplete membership and power struggles.

Following the collapse of the Republican government and Abdullah's meeting with Hekmatyar, the political fate of the HCNR remains unclear.

On 1 September 2021, Taliban representatives said that they had approached former president Hamid Karzai and Abdullah. The representatives said that the Taliban was "ready to recruit them" but said that Karzai was unlikely to be part of the government as they do not want "old horses". As for Abdullah, the Taliban showed a different approach saying that he was the "least controversial."

=== Taliban takeover and subsequent activities ===
In February 2022, Abdullah was temporarily placed under house arrest by the Taliban in Afghanistan. On 4 May 2022 he was allowed to leave for India to be with his family during Eid al-Fitr. He returned to Afghanistan on 11 June.

== See also ==
- Hasib Panjsheri

== Notes ==
Party political offices
New office	Deputy Leader of the Northern Alliance; 1996–2001	Succeeded by Position abolished
New office	Leader of the National Coalition of Afghanistan; 2010–present	Incumbent
Political offices
Preceded by Abdul Rahim Ghafoorzai	Minister of Foreign Affairs; 2001–2005	Succeeded by Rangin Dadfar Spanta
Preceded by Position established	Chief Executive Officer of Afghanistan; 2014–2020	Succeeded by Position abolished
