= 2010 Afghan parliamentary election =

- 18 September 2010

All 249 seats in the House of the People
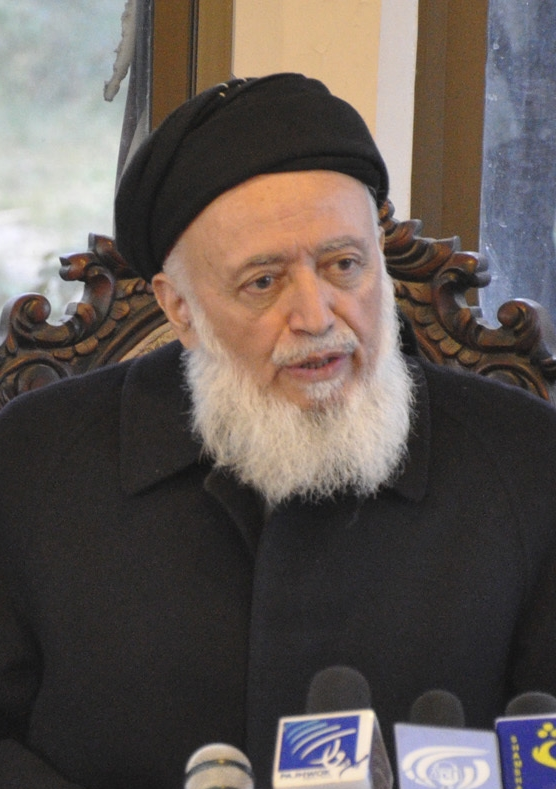

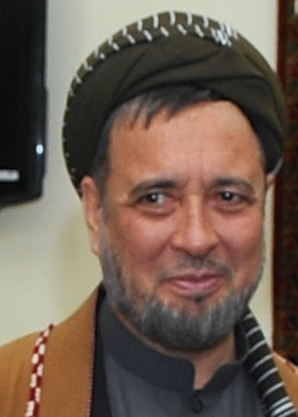

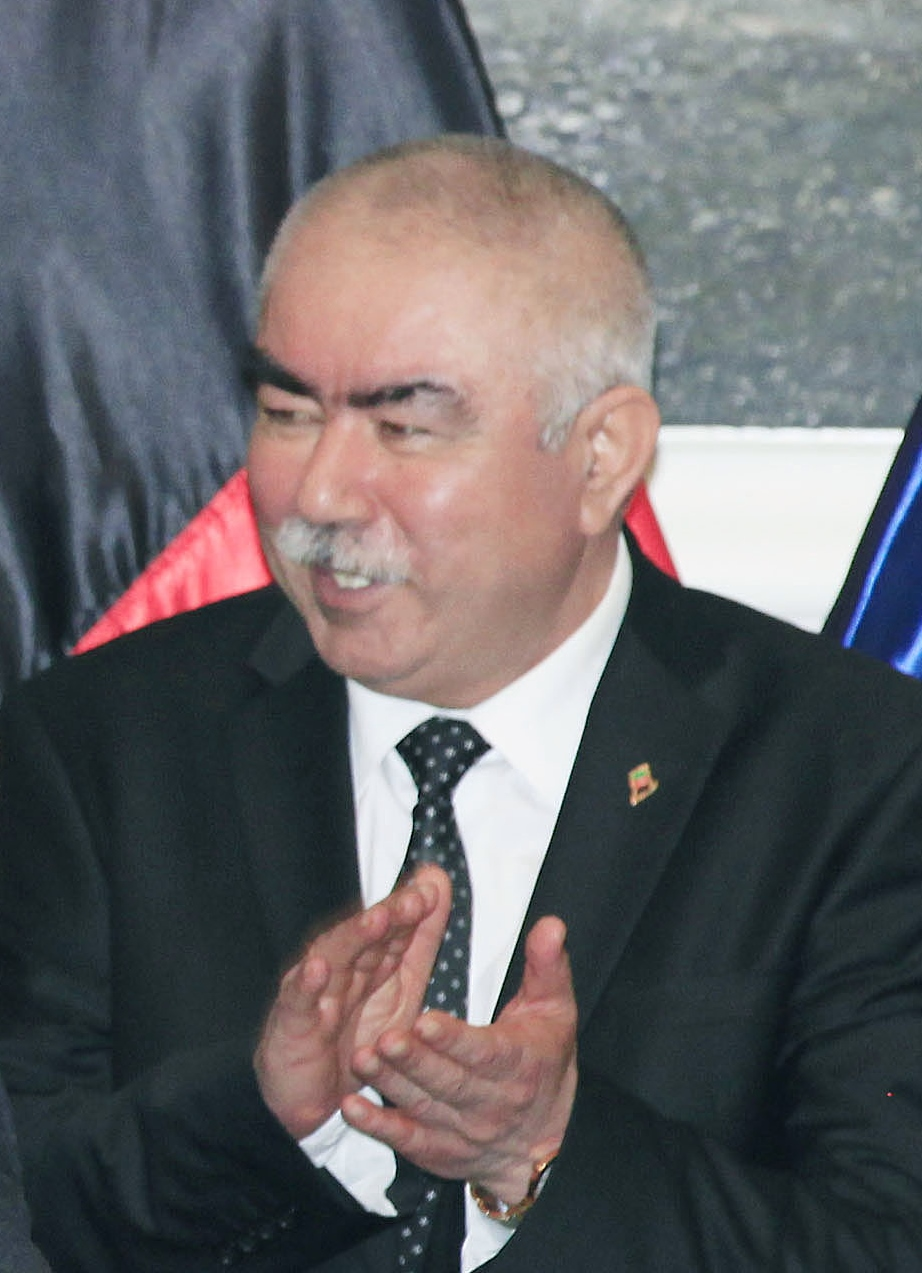
	First party	Second party	Third party
Leader	Burhanuddin Rabbani	Muhammad Mohaqiq	Abdul Rashid Dostum
Party	Jamiat-e Islami	PIUPA	Junbish
Alliance	Pro-Karzai	Pro-Karzai
Last election	22 seats	9 seats	33 seats
Seats won	17	11	10
Seat change	▼5	▲2	▼23
Speaker before election
Yunus Qanuni
Naveen
Elected Speaker
Abdul Raouf Ebrahimi
Independent

Parliamentary elections were held in Afghanistan on 18 September 2010 to elect members of the House of the People (Wolesi Jirga). The Afghan Independent Election Commission - established in accordance with the article 156 of the Constitution of Afghanistan for the purpose of organizing and supervising all elections in the country - postponed the poll from its original date of 22 May to September 18.

The results were delayed on several occasions, but were finalized on October 31. The Taliban issued a direct threat to all those involved in the House of the People elections.

== Campaign ==
The campaign period kicked off on June 23 and ran until September 16. On June 23, 2010, the full list of candidates was announced; 2,577 candidates filed to run, 405 of them women.

On July 7, 2010, the Electoral Complaint Commission announced that it had disqualified 36 candidates because of ties to illegal private militias. However, according to critics "the net caught a few small fish while the sharks swam around it". Sima Samar, who heads the Afghan Independent Human Rights Commission, said she was concerned that there were alleged war criminals on the candidate lists.

== Security ==
"We urge people not to participate in the election. Everything and everyone affiliated with the election is our target -- candidates, security forces, campaigners, election workers, voters are all our targets," said Taliban spokesman Zabiullah Mujahid.

Three candidates were killed during the campaign period while there were several attempts on the lives of others, some of which have resulted in the deaths of campaign workers.

In a tally kept by the Free Election Foundation of Afghanistan, at least eleven campaign workers were killed.

== Polling centres ==
On August 18, Afghanistan's Independent Election Commission announced it would open 5,897 polling centers for the 2010 Wolesi Jirga elections. This was 938 fewer than the original plan to have 6,835 centers opened.

The decision on whether to open or close polling centers was a matter of debate but the IEC said decisions on the polling centers were made in conjunction with the country's security agencies and on September 5 said it was too late to open more. This view was supported by the United Nations and Democracy International.

On September 8, the IEC said a further 81 polling centers would remain shut in eastern Nangarhar province. This brought to 1,019 centers closed, which is almost 15 per cent of the preliminary list of 6835.

== Voting system ==
The voting system used for House of the People elections is single non-transferable vote. The system allows for candidates with as little as less than one percent of the first-choice vote to be elected, something that happened with a number of candidates in the 2005 election. There have been calls to review the use of SNTV as it impedes the development of political parties and prevents fair and accurate representation of Afghanistan's diverse population.

== Candidates ==
There were 2,584 candidates on the ballots for the 2010 Wolesi Jirga elections, across 34 provinces and a country-wide electorate for the nomadic Kuchi tribe.

Some 406 candidates were women, who are allocated at least 68 seats.

Notable incumbent candidates include: Ramazan Bashar Dost, who came third in the 2009 Afghan Presidential election; Younus Qanooni, runner-up to President Hamid Karzai in the 2004 presidential election and the inaugural Speaker of the Wolesi Jirga; Shukria Barakzai, a vocal supporter of women's rights; and Mullah Abdul Salaam Rocketi, a former jihadist who earned his name from his skill in shooting rocket-propelled grenades during the Soviet occupation. All three of them stood for one of the 33 seats assigned to Kabul province. Fatima Aziz, an Afghan physician who was elected in 2005, was also re-elected.

Other candidates for Kabul included: comedian Zamir Kabuli, who is famous for ridiculing politicians and Farida Tarana, a 29-year-old former female contestant on Afghan Star, the local equivalent of American Idol.

== Controversy ==
Reflecting on the disputed previous presidential election, in December 2009 representatives of donor states expressed worries and even suggested that voting should be postponed. Since the violence and the accusations of fraud that accompanied the 2009 election, another round of voting was expected to do more harm than good. The planned election might lead to a new campaign of violence by the Taliban to intimidate voters. The United Nations, the US and election observation missions, including one representing the European Union, had asked the Afghan government to refrain from further elections until it had written a new election law and created a list of registered voters.

United States congressmen visiting Kabul that month also urged President Karzai to delay until electoral reforms were in place. Otherwise, Afghanistan could risk American financial support. Karzai insisted that the elections had to be held in May, despite concerns about their credibility.

On January 24, the election authorities in Afghanistan decided to postpone the elections until September 18, due to "security concerns, logistical problems, and insufficient funds". Using a loophole in the Constitution, the Karzai administration unilaterally rewrote the election law, and Karzai put it into effect by a decree on February 13, 2010. Under this new version, the five members of the Electoral Complaints Commission (ECC), would be chosen by the president after consultation with the parliamentary leadership. Previously, three of the seats were held by foreigners appointed by the United Nations and the other two members were Afghans. On March 31, 2010, the Lower House of the Afghan parliament rejected this change.

In a speech at the U.S. Institute of Peace (USIP) on May 17, 2010, former Foreign Minister Abdullah Abdullah warned that another rigged election would be catastrophic, even more than the discredited presidential election in August 2009 from which he dropped out.

On August 13, 2010, Staffan de Mistura, UN Secretary-General Ban Ki-moon's special representative for Afghanistan, called upon the Afghan security forces to show heightened vigilance, referring to widespread intimidation of female candidates, the killing of three candidates and other violence directed against candidates. The Free and Fair Election Foundation of Afghanistan (FEFA) stated that observers were based in all 34 provinces of Afghanistan to observe the campaigns at the provincial level, and volunteer observers in many districts as well.

Starting June 2010, FEFA published monitoring reports into the election campaign, in which it cataloged examples of violence against candidates or misuse of government resources. FEFA called on the Afghan government and Afghan and international security forces to take action against individuals perpetrating electoral violations and act decisively to protect voters and candidates and voters ahead of the parliamentary elections. In the report about the launch of the 2010 election campaigns, the FEFA detailed illegal actions of candidates, increasing attacks against candidates and campaign workers, and widespread intimidation of women. Warlords, the Taliban and rival candidates were blamed for the intimidation and already at least eight people had been assassinated in relation to the upcoming elections, including three candidates. According to some candidates the security situation was worse than with the 2009 elections, despite the arrival of the reinforcement of 30,000 American troops. Nader Nadery, Commissioner at the Afghanistan Independent Human Rights Commission (AIHRC) and director of FEFA, said that there was more intimidation, more attacks on female candidates and other candidates. "Areas in the south are becoming more and more insecure and areas in the north are becoming more and more intimidating for the weaker candidates." According to Mirwais Yasini, former deputy speaker of the Lower House and a candidate in Nangahar Province, in several districts it was impossible to campaign.

There were also reports of thousands of fake voter registration cards in circulation that threatened the credibility of elections.

Following the 2010 Qur'an-burning controversy, the UN's top diplomat in the country said the ensuing protests could force the delay of parliamentary elections.

=== Fraud prevention ===
The Independent Election Commission endeavored to prevent the massive fraud that marred 2009's presidential elections, in which one million ballots for President Hamid Karzai were ruled invalid.

The IEC sacked 6,000 election workers and tightened the security measures surrounding ballot boxes by introducing a computerized tracking system.

However, it was expected that fraud would still occur and would be hard to spot, according to election observers Democracy International.

== Conduct ==
On election day, at least fourteen people were killed amid UN and US warnings that security and fraud were major concerns at the election. The Taliban also fired rockets in several cities including Kabul and set off bombs at a polling station and by the governor of Kandahar's convoy.

A Taliban website said that upwards of a hundred attacks had been carried out, though these claims were not confirmed; election authorities, however, said that the elections as a whole had been safe. The organization that monitored the elections, the Free and Fair Elections Foundation, said that "[t]hough there were numerous attacks, none were severe enough to disrupt voting on a wide scale."

Fraud was also a concern, as some people were discovered trying to cast over a thousand illegitimate votes on behalf of candidates. Some officials were accused of taking bribes; and permanent ink was used to mark the fingers of those who had voted so as to identify and prevent multiple votes.

The total turnout of voters was estimated to be almost 3.6 million out of a total of more than 10 million eligible voters. The United Nations said that if five million people voted, the vote could be considered a success, given the difficulties of holding an election during a war. The head of Afghanistan's Independent Election Commission said that he would consider the election a success if more than three million people voted, a tally that came to pass. Out of a planned 5,816 open voting locations, authorities said that 92% had opened as scheduled, while the remainder had not opened due to security concerns. The turnout was reported to be light due to Taliban threats. However, the violence was also a lot less than expected.

== Results ==
On September 26, the Independent Election Commission (IEC) ordered recounts at locations in seven provinces, but left open the possibility of ordering recounts in other provinces. The recounts were ordered in Kunduz, Balkh, Takhar, Badakhshan and Parwan provinces in the north and northeast, Logar and Khost. At least five polling centres in eastern Khost province were declared invalid.

Preliminary results for all 34 provinces were originally due on October 8, but were unexpectedly put off citing the need to be "more accurate and precise." However, they would still be subject to confirmation after the Electoral Complaints Commission adjudicates on its legality. Final, certified results were released on October 31.

Party	General seats			Kuchi seats			Total seats
Party	Votes	%	Seats	Votes	%	Seats	Total seats
Independents	3,925,007	100.00	239	105,220	100.00	10	249
Total	3,925,007	100.00	239	105,220	100.00	10	249
Valid votes	3,925,007	95.47					
Invalid/blank votes	186,367	4.53					
Total votes	4,111,374	100.00					
Registered voters/turnout	10,300,000	39.92					
Source: IEC, Election Guide

=== Elected MPs ===
(This list is incomplete)

Name	Province	Number of votes	Percentage	M/F	Incumbency	Ethnicity	Political party
Alhaj Zulmai Mujadadi	Badakhshan	16,410	7.1%	m	incumbent	Tajik	Jamiat-e Islami
Fawzia Koofi	Badakhshan	16,192	7.0%	f	incumbent	Tajik	
Alhaj Safiullah Muslim	Badakhshan	8,632	3.7%	m	new	Uzbek	
Abdul Latif Pedram	Badakhshan	8,469	3.7%	m	new	Tajik	National Congress (Leader)
Amanullah Paiman	Badakhshan	8,289	3.6%	m	incumbent	Tajik	Jamiat-e Islami
Alhaj Shah Abdul Ahad Afzali	Badakhshan	8,164	3.5%	m	new	Tajik	
Muhammad Zekria Soda	Badakhshan	7,982	3.5%	m	new	Tajik	Jamiat-e Islami
Abdul Wali Niazi	Badakhshan	7,811	3.4%	m	new	Tajik	Jamiat-e Islami
Dr. Nilofar Ibrahimi	Badakhshan	3,667	1.6%	f	new	Tajik	
Sayed Muhammad Musa Janab Sahib	Badghis	4,593	7.4%	m	new		Hezbi Islami
Hajji Ghulam Sarwar Faiez	Badghis	3,802	6.1%	m	new	Hazara	
Alhaj Qazi Abdul Rahim	Badghis	3,261	5.3%	m	new	Hazara	
Safia Aymaq	Badghis	2,003	3.2%	f	new	Aymaq	Hezbi Islami
Sayed Mansoor Naderi	Baghlan	7,849	6.5%	m	incumbent	Hazara	Hezbe Paiwand Milli (Leader)
Obaidullah Rameen	Baghlan	5,362	4.4%	m	new	Hazara	
Shukria Esa Khil	Baghlan	5,247	4.3%	f	incumbent	Pasthun	Afghan Mellat Party
Dr Mahdi	Baghlan	5,154	4.2%	m	new	Tajik	Jamiat-e Islami
Muhammad Azim Muhsini	Baghlan	4,551	3.7%	m	new	Hazara	
Delawar Aymaq	Baghlan	3,856	3.2%	m	new	Aymaq	
Muhammad Zahir Ghani Zada	Baghlan	3,080	2.5%	m	new	Tajik	
Alhaj Ustad Najya Aymaq	Baghlan	1,373	1.1%	f	new	Aymaq	
Ahmad Shah Ramazan	Balkh	19,614	7.7%	m	new	Hazara	
Abas Ibrahim Zada	Balkh	18,413	7.2%	m	new	Hazara	Hezbe Wahdat Islami Mardum
Alhaj Muhammad Ishaq Rahguzar	Balkh	17,181	6.8%	m	incumbent	Arab	Jamiat-e Islami
Alhaj Alam Khan Azadi	Balkh	16,820	6.6%	m	incumbent	Arab	
Assadullah Sharifi	Balkh	15,351	6.0%	m	new	Tajik	Jamiat-e Islami
Alhaj Muhammad Abdah	Balkh	14,173	5.6%	m	incumbent	Hazara	Hezbe Wahdat Islami Mardum
Alhaj Maulawi Abdul Rahman Rahmani	Balkh	12,389	4.9%	m	new	Tajik	Jamiat-e Islami
Muhammad Farhad Azimi	Balkh	10,787	4.2%	m	new	Tajik	Jamiat-e Islami
Sifora Niazai	Balkh	4,358	1.7%	f	incumbent	Tajik	Jamiat-e Islami
Brishna Rabie	Balkh	3,229	1.3%	f	new	Tajik	Jamiat-e Islami
Dr. Gulalay Noor Safi	Balkh	3,018	1.2%	f	incumbent	Pashtun	
Colonel Abdul Rahman Shahidani	Bamyan	11,993	9.9%	m	new	Hazara	
Hajji Fakuri Behishti	Bamyan	11,824	9.7%	m	incumbent	Hazara	Hezbe Eqtedar Milli
Ustad Muhammad Akbari	Bamyan	10,857	8.9%	m	incumbent	Hazara	Hezbe Wahdat Milli Islami (Leader)
Safoora Yalkhani	Bamyan	5,603	4.6%	f	incumbent	Hazara	
Muhammad Noor Akbari	Daykundi	15,780	10.5%	m	incumbent	Hazara	
Asadullah Saadati	Daykundi	12,742	8.5%	m	new	Hazara	Hezbe Wahdat Islami
Sadiqi Zada Neli	Daykundi	10,592	7.1%	m	incumbent	Hazara	Hezbe Eqtedar Milli
Sherin Muhseni	Daykundi	8,581	5.7%	f	incumbent	Hazara	
Ustad Humaira Ayubi	Farah	3,763	10.0%	f	new	Pashtun	
Samiullah Samim	Farah	3,690	9.8%	m	new	Tajik	Jamiat-e Islami
Hajji Mammor Mussa	Farah	2,642	7.0%	m	incumbent	Pashtun	Hezbi Islami
Abdul Sabor Khidmat	Farah	2,415	6.4%	m	new	Pashtun	
Alhaj Saranwal Muhammad Sarwar Usmani Farahi	Farah	2,223	5.9%	m	new	Tajik	Jamiat-e Islami
Hajji Muhammad Hashim	Faryab	9,299	5.0%	m	new	Pashtun	
Dr. Naqebullah Fayeq	Faryab	7,720	4.1%	m	new	Uzbek	
Eng. Muhammad Hashim Awartaq	Faryab	7,617	4.1%	m	new	Uzbek	
Bashir Ahmad Tah Yenj	Faryab	7,427	4.0%	m	new	Uzbek	
Alhaj Fathullah Qaisari	Faryab	7,221	3.9%	m	incumbent	Uzbek	Junbish Milli
Muhammad Shakar Kargar	Faryab	6,906	3.7%	m	incumbent	Uzbek	Junbish Milli
Fauzia Raoufi	Faryab	2,480	1.3%	f	incumbent	Pashtun	
Rangina Kargar	Faryab	1,573	0.8%	f	new	Uzbek	
Asifa Shadab	Faryab	1,349	0.7%	f	incumbent	Tajik	
Ali Akbar Qasimi	Ghazni	13,855	7.7%	m	incumbent	Hazara	Hezbe Wahdat Islami Mardum
Muhammad Ali Akhlaqi	Ghazni	10,078	5.6%	m	new	Hazara	
Dr. Shah Jahan	Ghazni	9,209	5.1%	m	new	Hazara	
Muhammad Ali Alizada	Ghazni	8,498	4.7%	m	new	Hazara	Hezbe Wahdat Islami Mardum
Dr. Abdul Qayoom Sajadi	Ghazni	6,898	3.9%	m	new	Hazara	
Ustad Muhammad Arif Rahmani	Ghazni	6,864	3.8%	m	new	Hazara	
Khodadad Erfani	Ghazni	6,658	3.7%	m	new	Hazara	Hezbe Wahdat Islami
Huma Sultani	Ghazni	6,238	3.5%	f	new	Hazara	
Eng. Nafisa Azimi	Ghazni	6,228	3.5%	f	new	Hazara	Hezbe Wahdat Islami Mardum
Chaman Shah Etimadi	Ghazni	5,891	3.3%	m	new	Hazara	Hezbe Wahdat Islami
Shah Gull Rezayee	Ghazni	3,679	2.1%	f	incumbent	Hazara	
Dr. Muhammad Ibrahim Malikzad	Ghor	18,493	10.5%	m	incumbent	Aymaq	
Hajji Qurban Kohistnai	Ghor	15,698	8.9%	m	incumbent	Hazara	
Aqay Bahr	Ghor	13,385	7.6%	m	new	Hazara	
Hajji Karamuddin Reza Zada	Ghor	12,352	7.0%	m	new	Aymaq	
Ruqia Naiel	Ghor	8,747	5.0%	f	incumbent	Hazara	
Seema Joyenda	Ghor	3,960	2.2%	f	new	Aymaq	
Shikh Namtullah Ghafari	Helmand	3,042	9.1%	m	incumbent	Hazara	
Hajji Abdul Hay	Helmand	2,403	7.2%	m	new	Pashtun	
Hajji Muhammad Wali Alizai	Helmand	1,881	5.7%	m	new	Pashtun	
Abdul Wudod	Helmand	1,847	5.6%	m	new	Pashtun	
Abdul Jabar Qahraman	Helmand	1,773	5.3%	m	new	Pashtun	Hezbi Islami
Massoud Khan Noorzai	Helmand	1,664	4.9%	m	new	Pashtun	
Nasima Niazai	Helmand	1,324	4.0%	f	incumbent	Pashtun	
Habiba Sadat	Helmand	574	1.7%	f	new	Pashtun	
Ghulam Farooq Majroh	Herat	9,524	3.3%	m	new	Tajik	Jamiat-e Islami
Qazi Nazer Ahmad Hanafi	Herat	8,716	3.0%	m	incumbent	Tajik	Jamiat-e Islami
Ahmad Bihzad	Herat	7,733	2.7%	m	incumbent	Hazara	
Hajji Ghulam Farooq Nazari	Herat	7,346	2.6%	m	new	Tajik	Jamiat-e Islami
Ahmad Farhad Majedi	Herat	7,005	2.4%	m	new	Tajik	
Muhammad Reza Khushak Watan Dost	Herat	6,961	2.4%	m	new	Hazara	
Hajji Muhammad Arif Tayeb	Herat	6,106	2.1%	m	incumbent	Aymaq	Jamiat-e Islami
Hajji Khalil Ahmad Shahed Zada	Herat	6,048	2.1%	m	new	Tajik	Jamiat-e Islami
Abdul Hadi Jamshedi	Herat	5,689	2.0%	m	incumbent	Tajik	Jamiat-e Islami
Dr. Muhammad Salih Saljoqi	Herat	5,577	1.9%	m	incumbent	Tajik	Jamiat-e Islami
Alhaj Eng. Monawar Shah Bahaduri	Herat	5,430	1.9%	m	new	Pashtun	
Alhaj Muhammad Rafiq Shaheer	Herat	5,347	1.9%	m	new	Pashtun	
Nahid Ahamdi Farid	Herat	4,042	1.4%	f	new		
Shanaz Hemati	Herat	3,961	1.4%	f	incumbent		
Masooda Karukhi	Herat	2,092	0.7%	f	new	Tajik	
Ustad Najla Dehqan Nazhad	Herat	2,041	0.7%	f	incumbent	Pashtun	Hezbi Islami
Yasamin Barikzai	Herat	1,688	0.6%	f	new	Pashtun	Hezbe Musharikat Mili
Dr. Enayatullah Babur Ferahmand	Juzjan	8,137	8.1%	m	new	Uzbek	
Baz Muhammad Juzjani	Juzjan	6,453	6.4%	m	incumbent	Arab	
Abdul Satar Darzabi	Juzjan	5,543	5.5%	m	incumbent	Uzbek	Junbish Milli
Hajji Muhammad Ismail	Juzjan	5,168	5.1%	m	new	Turkmen	
Fahima Sadat	Juzjan	3,058	3.0%	f	incumbent	Tajik	
Hajji Muhammad Mohaqiq	Kabul	16,233	3.6%	m	new	Hazara	Hezbe Wahdat Islami Mardum (Leader)
Yunus Qanuni	Kabul	9,548	2.1%	m	incumbent	Tajik	Hezbe Afghanistan Naween (Leader)
Dr Ramazan Bashar Dost	Kabul	7,935	1.8%	m	incumbent	Hazara	
Abdulrab Rasul Sayyaf	Kabul	7,158	1.6%	m	incumbent	Pashtun	Hezbe Dawat Islami (Leader)
Wakeel Fatima Nazari	Kabul	6,834	1.5%	m	new	Hazara	Hezbe Niyaaz Milli (Leader)
Mir Amanullah Guzar	Kabul	6,686	1.5%	m	new	Tajik	Jamiat-e Islami
Farkhunda Zahra Naderi	Kabul	6,612	1.5%	f	new	Hazara	Hezbe Paiwand Milli
Hajji Muhammad Farhad Seddiqi	Kabul	5,128	1.1%	m	new	Tajik	Jamiat-e Islami
Muhammad Ibrahim Qasemi	Kabul	5,014	1.1%	m	incumbent	Hazara	
Jafar Mahdavi	Kabul	5,013	1.1%	m	new	Hazara	Hezbe Wahdat Islami Mardum
Sayed Hussain Anwari	Kabul	4,715	1.1%	m	new	Hazara	Hezbe Harakat Islami (Leader)
Baktash Siawash	Kabul	4,557	1.0%	m	new	Tajik	
Alhaj Ezatullah Atif	Kabul	4,429	1.%	m	new	Arab	
Alhaj Allah Gull Mujahid	Kabul	4,115	0.9%	m	new	Pashtun	Hezbi Islami
Hajji Muhammad Dawoud Kalakani	Kabul	3,926	0.9%	m	incumbent	Tajik	Hezbe Dawat Islami
Sharifullah Kamawal	Kabul	3,876	0.9%	m	new	Pashtun	Hezbi Islami
Dr Sayed Ali Kazemi	Kabul	3,764	0.8%	m	new	Hazara	Hezbe Eqtedar Milli (Leader)
Qais Hassan	Kabul	3,608	0.8%	m	new	Pashtun	Hezbi Islami
Sayed Hussain Alimi Balkhi	Kabul	3,423	0.8%	m	incumbent	Hazara	
Eng. Shir Wali Wardak	Kabul	3,409	0.8%	m	new	Pashtun	Hezbi Islami
Anwar Khan Oriakhil	Kabul	3,200	0.7%	m	incumbent	Pashtun	
Ramazan Juma Zada	Kabul	3,148	0.7%	m	new	Hazara	Hezbe Paiwand Milli
Shinkai Karokhail	Kabul	2,999	0.7%	f	new	Pashtun	
Arfanullah Arfan	Kabul	2,977	0.7%	m	incumbent	Pashtun	Hezbi Islami
Dr Abdullah Kalimzai Wardak	Kabul	2,918	0.7%	m	new	Pashtun	Hezbi Islami
Ustad Qurban Ali Arfani	Kabul	2,905	0.7%	m	new	Hazara	Hezbe Wahdat Islami Millat (Leader)
Abdul Hafiz Mansoor	Kabul	2,903	0.7%	m	new	Tajik	Jamiat-e Islami
Torpekai Patman	Kabul	2,258	0.5%	f	new	Pashtun	
Shukria Barikzai	Kabul	2,174	0.5%	f	incumbent	Pashtun	
Ustad Rababa Parwani Darwish	Kabul	1,309	0.3%	f	new	Hazara	
General Nazifa Zaki	Kabul	1,210	0.3%	f	new	Tajik	
Kubra Mustafawi	Kabul	1,129	0.3%	f	new	Hazara	
Fawzia Nasir Yar Guldarayee	Kabul	1,119	0.3%	f	incumbent	Tajik	
Turan Sahib Abdul Khaliq Khan Balakarzai	Kandahar	5,663	7.5%	m	new	Pashtun	
Muhammad Naiem Lalay Hamidzai	Kandahar	5,435	7.2%	m	new	Pashtun	
Hajji Muhammad Omar Nangialay	Kandahar	4,946	6.6%	m	new	Pashtun	
Abdul Rahim Ayubi	Kandahar	4,859	6.4%	m	new	Pashtun	
Alhaj Mullah Sayed Muhammad Akhund	Kandahar	3,452	4.6%	m	new	Pashtun	
Dr. Mahmood Khan	Kandahar	3,438	4.6%	m	new	Pashtun	
Khalid Pashtoon	Kandahar	3,048	4.0%	m	incumbent		
Attaullah Jan Habib	Kandahar	3,004	4.0%	m	new	Pashtun	
Fariba Ahmadi Kakar	Kandahar	2,289	3.0%	f	new	Pashtun	
Bibi Hamida	Kandahar	938	1.2%	f	new	Pashtun	
Shakeeba Hashimi	Kandahar	627	0.8%	f	incumbent	Hazara	
Alhaj Mirdad Khan Nijrabi	Kapisa	10,199	22.5%	m	new	Tajik	
Eng. Muhammad Iqbal Safi	Kapisa	6,641	14.7%	m	incumbent	Pashtun	Hezbi Islami
Hajji Agha Jan	Kapisa	3,574	7.9%	m	new	Tajik	Hezbi Islami
Tahira Mujadidi	Kapisa	1,464	3.2%	f	new	Tajik	Hezbi Islami
Kamal Nasir Usoli	Khost	4,921	14.4%	m	new	Pashtun	
Homayoon	Khost	2,839	8.3%	m	new		
Alhaj Dr. Mirbat Khan Mangal	Khost	2,659	7.8%	m	new	Pashtun	Hezbi Islami
Leyaqatullah Babakarkhil	Khost	2,176	6.4%	m	incumbent	Pashtun	
Sahira Sharif	Khost	2,110	6.2%	f	incumbent	Pashtun	
Maulawi Shazada Shaid	Kunar	8,359	11.8%	m	incumbent		
Hajji Sakhi	Kunar	6,827	9.7%	m	new	Pashtun	Hezbi Islami
Hajji Salih Muhammad	Kunar	5,853	8.3%	m	new	Pashtun	
Wagma Sapai	Kunar	2,538	3.6%	f	Pashtun		

=== Pre-result reaction ===
President Karzai responded to the allegations, saying "[i]t is early for us to make concrete judgment ... as far as the quality of the election is concerned, and organization, this is too early to judge. The president and government will make judgment after the relevant organisations have concluded their work."

=== Fraud allegations ===
Additionally, more than 100 complaints of fraud were filed in the first weekend, with another 1,300 complaints submitted orally, though the election commission said that they would not be reviewed unless they were put into writing. By September 26, 3,460 complaints had been received by the Electoral Complaints Commission.

Many candidates demanded a suspension of the vote because of allegations of fraud and vote-rigging.

The election commission voided more than 20%, or 1.3 million, of the ballots, after fraud investigations.

Twenty-one elected parliamentarians were also disqualified due to fraud. A spokesman of the electoral commission said that 19 of the candidates were winning or leading their races, while two others had failed to win seats.

Despite ongoing allegations of fraud and disqualifications, Karzai agreed to open parliament if the said controversies were not brought up.

On 23 June 2011, a special tribunal led by Sidiquallah Haqiq and set up by Karzai to probe election irregularities declared the election of 62 MPs void and others elected in their stead, about a quarter of the races in the election. The MPs have the right to appeal to the Afghan Supreme Court

On August 21, 2011, The Afghanistan Independent Election Commission announced at a news conference that nine members of Parliament would be removed and that nine candidates, previously disqualified over electoral irregularities, would have their seats restored.

=== Party results ===
Only a minority of candidates contested the election on a party ticket, whilst a number of elected MP's were loosely associated with certain parties. Below is a table detailing the NDI's assessment of formal party strength. Due to the often unclear nature of Afghan party politics the figures given are not exact, and do not include unofficial party supporters, but are instead limited to the candidates who openly declared their party allegiance.

Party	Seats
Jamiat-e Islami	17
People's Islamic Unity Party of Afghanistan	11
National Islamic Movement of Afghanistan	10
Jamhori	9
Hezbe Wahdat	7
National Islamic Front	6
Afghan Mellat Party	4
Islamic Dawah Organisation	4
National Solidarity Party	4
Islamic Movement	4
Hezbi Islami	1
National United Party	1
Adalat-e Islami	1
National Solidarity Movement	1
Wahdat Islami Millat-e	1
Hezbe Eqtedar Milli	1
Niaz Milli	1
New Afghanistan Party	1
Musharakat-e Milli	1
Republican Party	0
Total	85
Source: National Democracy Institute
