= National Understanding Front of Afghanistan =

Alliance of political parties in Afghanistan in 2005

National Understanding Front of Afghanistan (Jabha-ye Tafahom-e Melli-ye Afghanistan) was an alliance of opposition parties in Afghanistan. It was founded in April 2005, with the intention of jointly contesting elections. It did however become inactive within a couple of months. Yunus Qanuni was the main leader of the front.

Members of the front were:

- New Afghanistan Party
- People's Islamic Unity Party of Afghanistan
- Islamic Rule Party of Afghanistan
- Islamic Movement of Afghanistan
- National and Islamic Unity Party of Afghanistan
- National Independence Party of Afghanistan
- Islamic and National Revolution Movement of Afghanistan
- Islamic Organisation "Young Afghanistan"
- National and Islamic Moderate Party of Afghanistan
- Peace and National Unity Party of Afghanistan
- National Unity Party of the Tribes of Afghanistan
- National Solidarity Movement of Afghanistan (joined in May 2005)

Three individual presidential candidates joined the front, Abdul Hafeez Mansoor, Mir Mahfouz Neda'i and Latif Pedram. But the latter two left after two weeks.
