= 2004 Afghan presidential election =

- October 9, 2004
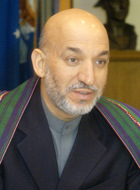

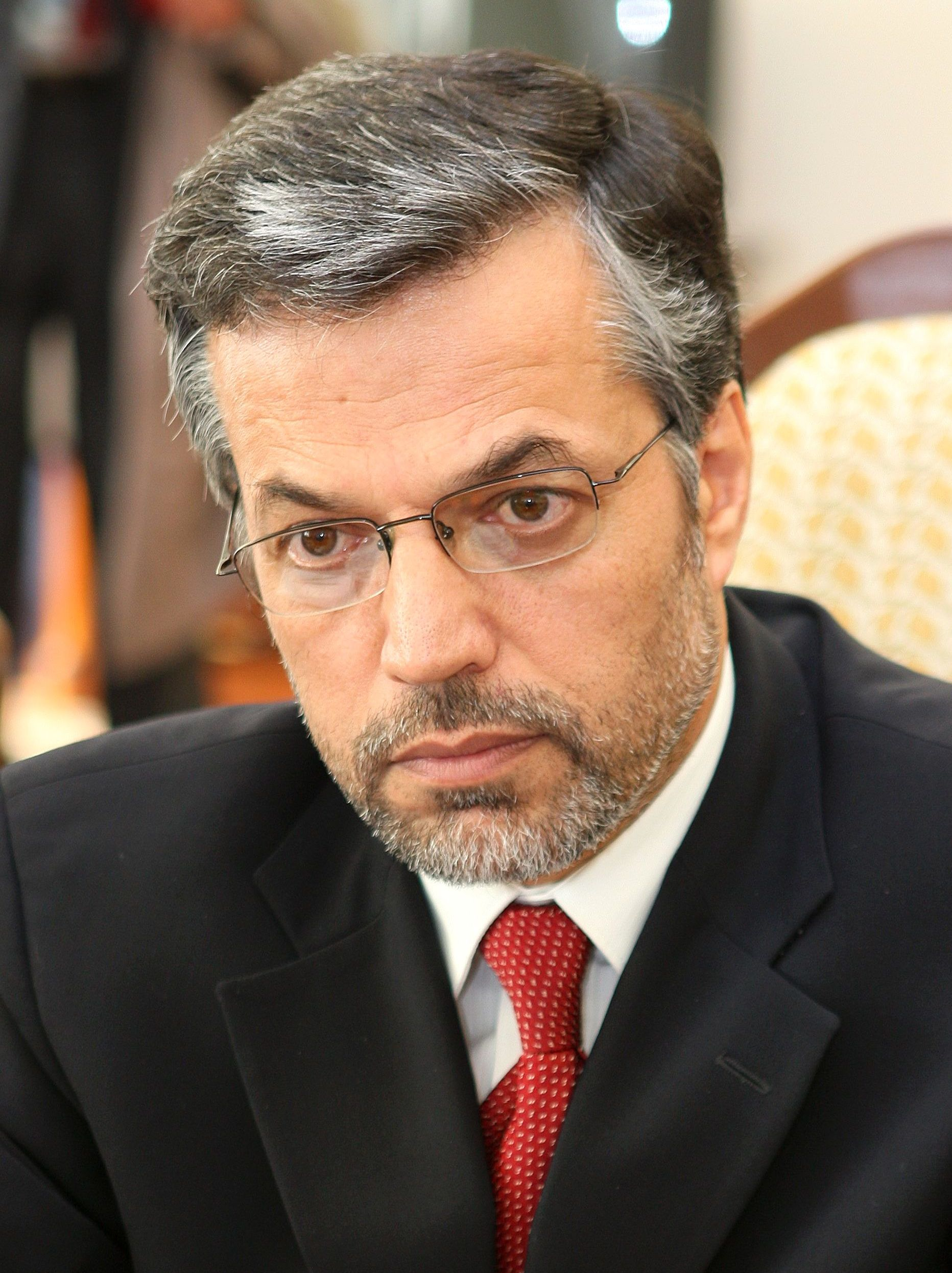

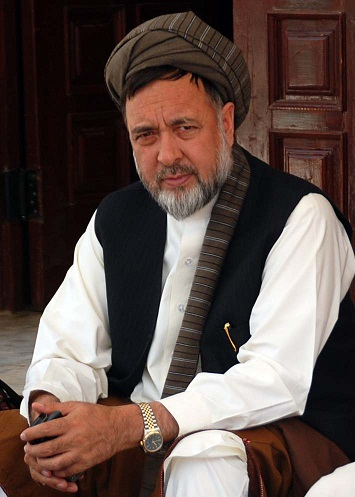

Nominee	Hamid Karzai	Yunus Qanuni	Mohammed Mohaqiq
Party	Independent	Naveen	PIUPA
Running mate	Karim Khalili
Popular vote	4,443,029	1,306,503	935,325
Percentage	55.37%	16.28%	11.66%
Nominee	Abdul Rashid Dostum
Party	Junbish
Popular vote	804,861
Percentage	10.03%
- Results by province
President before election
Hamid Karzai
Independent
Elected President
Hamid Karzai
Independent

Presidential elections were held in Afghanistan on October 9, 2004. Hamid Karzai won the elections with 55% of the vote and three times more votes than any other candidate. Twelve candidates received less than 1% of the vote. It is estimated that more than three-quarters of Afghanistan's nearly 12 million registered voters cast ballots. The elections were overseen by the Joint Electoral Management Body, chaired by Zakim Shah and vice-chaired by Ray Kennedy, an American working for the United Nations.

After some accusations of fraud circulated on the day of the election, at least fifteen candidates declared that they were boycotting the ballot, but the boycott dissolved when the United Nations announced it would set up a three-person independent panel to investigate the charges of irregularities. The panel included a former Canadian diplomat, a Swedish electoral expert, and the third member was later named by the European Union.

The date was originally set for July 5, 2004. The elections were twice postponed, first until September, and then until October. Candidates for president also nominated two vice-presidential candidates. Some candidates used this to balance their ticket with regard to Afghanistan's three main ethnic communities. If no candidate had secured 50% of the votes, a run-off election would have been held.

== Candidates and issues ==
Twenty-three candidates put their name forward for presidency, but five of them dropped out of the running by the time campaigning began.

The favourite throughout was interim president Hamid Karzai. Karzai ran as an independent, though he had the backing of several political parties, including Afghan Mellat, a social democratic party.

Initially, General Abdul Rashid Dostum, a warlord that led the National Islamic Movement of Afghanistan and then became a member of the Afghan National Army in Karzai's first interim government, was expected to be Karzai's main challenger, but it soon became clear that his popularity was limited.

Yunus Qanuni, who served in several prominent positions in the interim government, instead emerged as the focus of opposition to Karzai. Qanuni, a leading member of the Northern Alliance, had the support of Mohammed Fahim, an interim vice-president who was dropped from the Karzai ticket during the campaign. Qanuni claimed to represent the legacy of Ahmad Shah Massoud, as did several other candidates (including Massoud's brother, one of Karzai's vice-presidential candidates).

Also running was Mohammed Mohaqiq. He was a leader of the Islamic Unity Party of Afghanistan, a minister under Burhanuddin Rabbani and Karzai, and had been a strong ally of Dostum. Mohaqiq criticised Karzai as a weak leader and pledged to unite conflicting factions and end the drugs trade. He faced widespread accusations that he committed war crimes during the fight against the Soviet occupation, subsequent internecine conflict within the Mujahedin, and later, against the Taliban.

The youngest candidate was 41-year-old Abdul Hafiz Mansoor. He was a member of the Northern Alliance and claimant to the legacy of Massoud. A journalist and former Minister for Information and Culture, Mansoor accused Karzai of trying to form an elected dictatorship.

The main candidate of the religious right was Ahmad Shah Ahmadzai, leader of the exiled government in Pakistan during the Soviet occupation. Ahmadzai formerly led a radical Islamist group which was active in the Mujahedin, and later in both the Taleban and Al-Qaida, but has since disavowed any links with them.

Hamyon Shah Aasifi represented monarchist groups, although the former King, Mohammed Zahir Shah, has renounced his claims to be head of state.

Abdul Satar Sirat held several ministerial positions in the early 1970s. Sirat later served as envoy for the exiled King and was initially voted leader of the interim government but stepped aside in favour Karzai.

Massouda Jalal, a medical doctor, was the only female candidate, although two women were nominated for vice-president (Nelab Mobarez running with Aasifi and Shafiqa Habibi running with Dostum).

Several candidates publicly supported women's rights, including Karzai, Wakil Mangal and, most prominently, the former police colonel Abdul Hasib Aarian. 72-year-old Abdul Hadi Khalilzai, the oldest candidate and a former teacher and religious lawyer, claimed to support women's rights "according to the Constitution, accepted Afghan tradition and the holy religion of Islam".

Latif Pedram, a journalist and poet, and Mohammed Ibrahim Rashid were strong advocates for the rights of Afghan refugees. Sayed Ishaq Gailani, a Muslim intellectual who fought against the Soviet occupation, stood to represent the Sufi Muslim minority. All candidates claimed to be able to build bridges between Afghanistan's various communities and factions. Ghulam Farooq Nejrabi, a paediatric physician and medical lecturer who called for an end to religious, ethnic and sexual discrimination, even claimed he could build bridges with the Taleban. Mahfuz Nedahi, who had served as Minister of Mines and Industry in the interim government, accused the other candidates of running on tribal or party lines and failing to offer a true programme of national unity, while Sayed Abdul Hadi Dabir, an amateur boxer and former fighter in the Mujahedin, criticised tribal nepotism in government appointments and called for a national Ulema to be formed as part of the elected parliament.

== Campaigning and voting ==
Ballots contained the names of candidates, accompanied by their photo and an icon of their choice. Where appropriate, the icon was the symbol of their political party. However, most candidates ran as independents regardless of their party affiliation, and selected generic icons to distinguish their candidacy. In order to avoid voting fraud, voters dipped their thumb in ink after they had cast their ballot.

In Afghanistan, polling centres opened at 6 am or 7 am in different areas, and were set to close at 4 pm. However, on election day, voting time was officially extended by two hours, but several polling centres closed on time before news of this announcement reached them.

Very significantly, the International Organization for Migration (IOM) operated a voter education campaign among refugee communities in Pakistan and Iran. Over two million people voted as a result. In Peshawar, Pakistan, under the leadership of Stuart Poucher, a small team from IOM managed in less than two months to hire over 400 electoral officers, and over 6,000 polling officials, to conduct voter education for over 800,000 refugees, over half of whom voted.

== Controversies ==
During the campaign there were some rumours that the election would be decided by negotiation, as candidates bargained for promises of political position under Karzai or another candidate in return for dropping out of the race. There were rumours in September that Sirat and Mohaqiq had formed a pact with Qanuni, whilst Gailani and Aarian declared their support for Karzai on the last day of campaigning, October 6.

All the candidates except Karzai, Gailani and Aarian, publicly declared that they were boycotting the ballot and would ignore the results— effectively uniting Karzai's disparate opponents. Two major opposition candidates, the Hazara leader Mohammed Mohaqeq and the Uzbek strongman General Abdul Rashid Dostum, soon declared they had not joined the boycott.

=== Election fraud ===
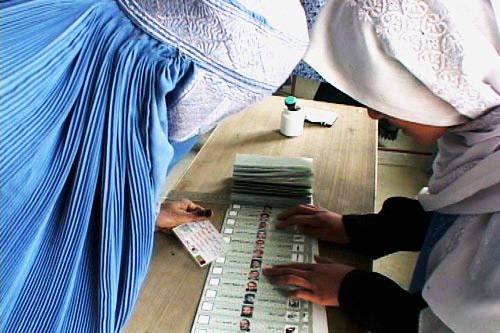
A Joint Electoral Management Body employee, right, explains how to fill out an election ballot to an Afghan woman in the village of Raban

Significant fraud occurred in the 2004 presidential election, even though it did not attract the level of international attention as the fraud in the 2009 presidential election.

On election day there were several claims that the ink used to mark voters could be easily removed and that multiple voting had resulted, as well as isolated reports of intimidation and campaigning at the polling centres.

Journalist Christian Parenti claimed that many people in Afghanistan were in possession of three or four photographic ID cards. He himself, not an Afghan citizen, could have easily voted. "One of the parties gave me two valid voting cards," he said "that I could add my photograph to and I could have voted if I wanted to." Other problems reported by Parenti included lack of pens in polling places, not having enough ballots, and differences in closing times of voting stations.

The documentary film "God's Open Hand" by Ghost Studios exposes voter fraud. However, the film mainly focuses on the hopes and dreams of the Afghan people on their first ever presidential elections.

In September 2009, Hamid Karzai, downplaying the significance of the fraud in the 2009 presidential election, said "there was fraud in 2004" as well.

On September 3, 2009, when envoys from the United States, Britain, France, Germany, and other Western nations met in Paris to discuss the recent 2009 Afghan election, UN Special Representative in Afghanistan Kai Eide said that the 2009 Afghan presidential election, widely characterized by rampant fraud and intimidation, "was a better election than five years ago."

== Violence ==
Rebels loyal to the former Taliban leadership had vowed to disrupt the election, accusing the United States moving to dominate the region. During the election process, five Afghan National Army soldiers died in skirmishes and due to landmines. Fifteen staff members of the Joint Electoral Management Body were killed and a further 46 injured in various attacks. Two international sub-contractors working in Nuristan in support of the electoral process were also killed.

== Results ==
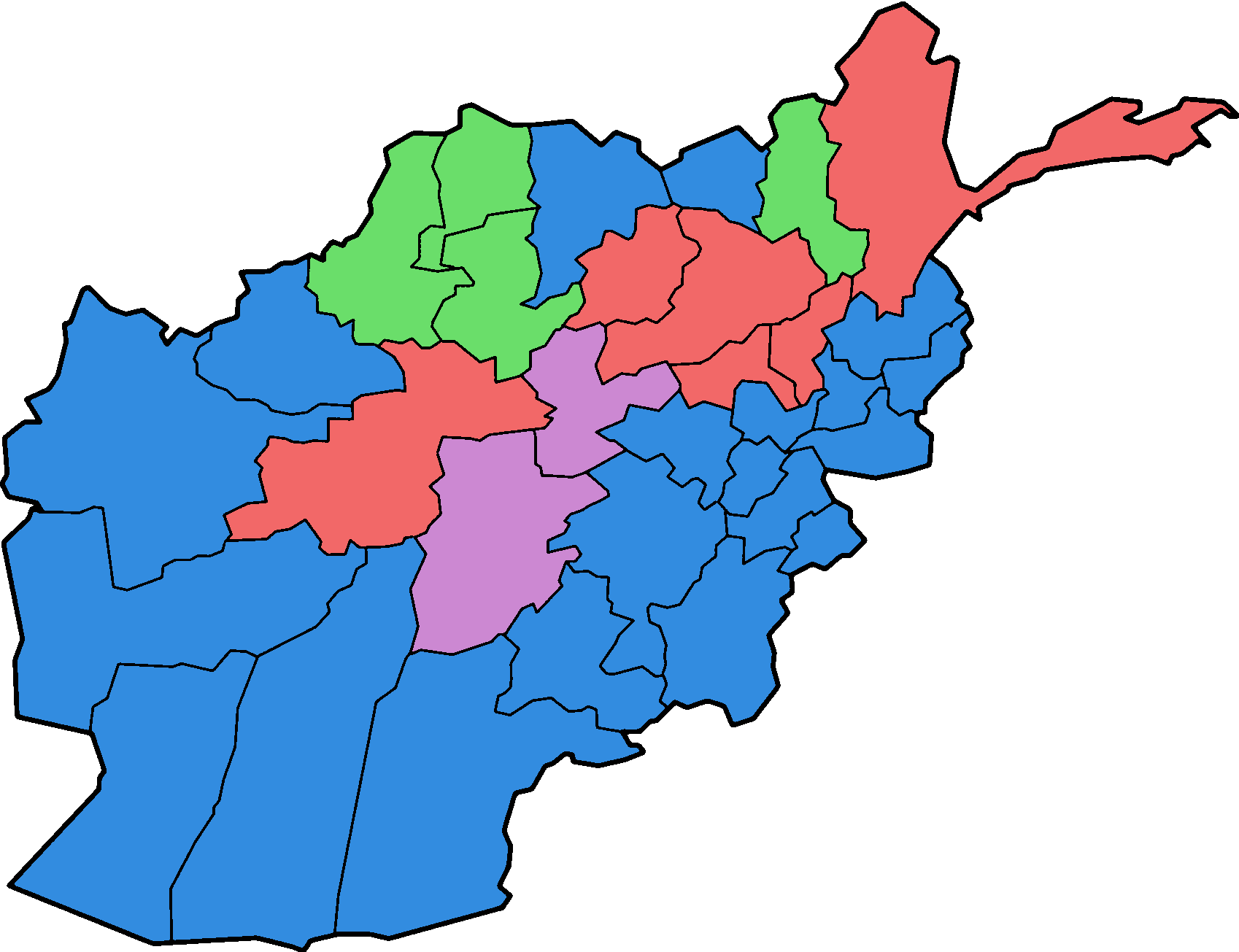
Hamid Karzai Yunus Qanuni Abdul Rashid Dostum Mohammed Mohaqiq

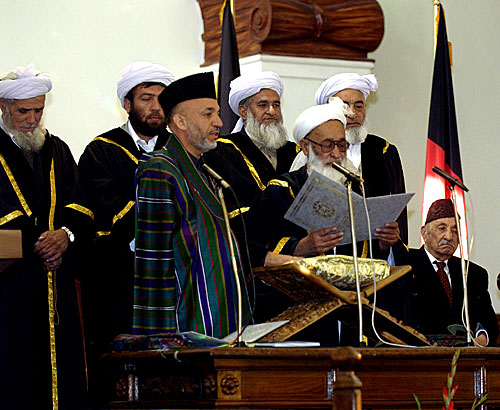
Inauguration of President Hamid Karzai on December 7, 2004, after winning the presidential election.

Candidate	Party	Votes	%
Hamid Karzai	Independent	4,443,029	55.37
Yunus Qanuni	New Afghanistan Party	1,306,503	16.28
Mohammed Mohaqiq	Independent/PIUPA	935,325	11.66
Abdul Rashid Dostum	Independent/National Islamic Movement	804,861	10.03
Abdul Latif Pedram	National Congress Party	110,160	1.37
Massouda Jalal	Independent	91,415	1.14
Sayed Ishaq Gailani	National Solidarity Movement	80,081	1.00
Ahmad Shah Ahmadzai	Independent/Islamic Revolutionary Movement	60,199	0.75
Abdul Satar Sirat	Independent	30,201	0.38
Hamyon Shah Aasifi	Independent/National Unity Party	26,224	0.33
Ghulam Farooq Nejrabi	Afghan Independence Party	24,232	0.30
Sayed Abdul Hadi Dabir	Independent	24,057	0.30
Abdul Hafiz Mansoor	Independent/Jamiat-e Islami	19,728	0.25
Abdul Hadi Khalilzai	Independent	18,082	0.23
Mir Mahfuz Nedahi	Independent	16,054	0.20
Mohammed Ibrahim Rashid	Independent	14,242	0.18
Wakil Mangal	Independent	11,770	0.15
Abdul Hasib Aarian	Independent	8,373	0.10
Total		8,024,536	100.00
Valid votes		8,024,536	98.72
Invalid/blank votes		104,404	1.28
Total votes		8,128,940	100.00
Registered voters/turnout		9,716,413	83.66
Source: IEC, IFES
