= Shinkai =

Shinkai may refer to:

- DSV Shinkai, research submersible
- Shinkai (album)
- Shinkai railway station, Pakistan
- Shinkai (divine rank), Shinto kami system

People with the given name or surname Shinkai include:

- Makoto Shinkai (born 1973), Japanese animator, filmmaker and manga artist
- Seiji Shinkai (born 1944), Japanese chemist and professor
- Shinkai Karokhail (born 1962), Afghan politician and rights activist

== See also ==
- Xinkai (disambiguation)
