= Akhlaghi =

Akhlaghi or Akhlaqi (Persian: اخلاقی) is a surname. Notable people with the surname include:

- Azadeh Akhlaghi (born 1978), Iranian photographer and visual artist
- Davoud Akhlaghi, Iranian cyclist
- Habibollah Akhlaghi (born 1985), Iranian wrestler
- Mehrdad Akhlaghi (born 1958), Iranian defence official
- Mohammad Hassanzadeh Saberi Akhlaghi, Iranian basketball player
- Muhammad Ali Akhlaqi, Afghan politician
