= Fatima Aziz =

Afghan physician and politician (1973–2021)

- فاطمه عزیز
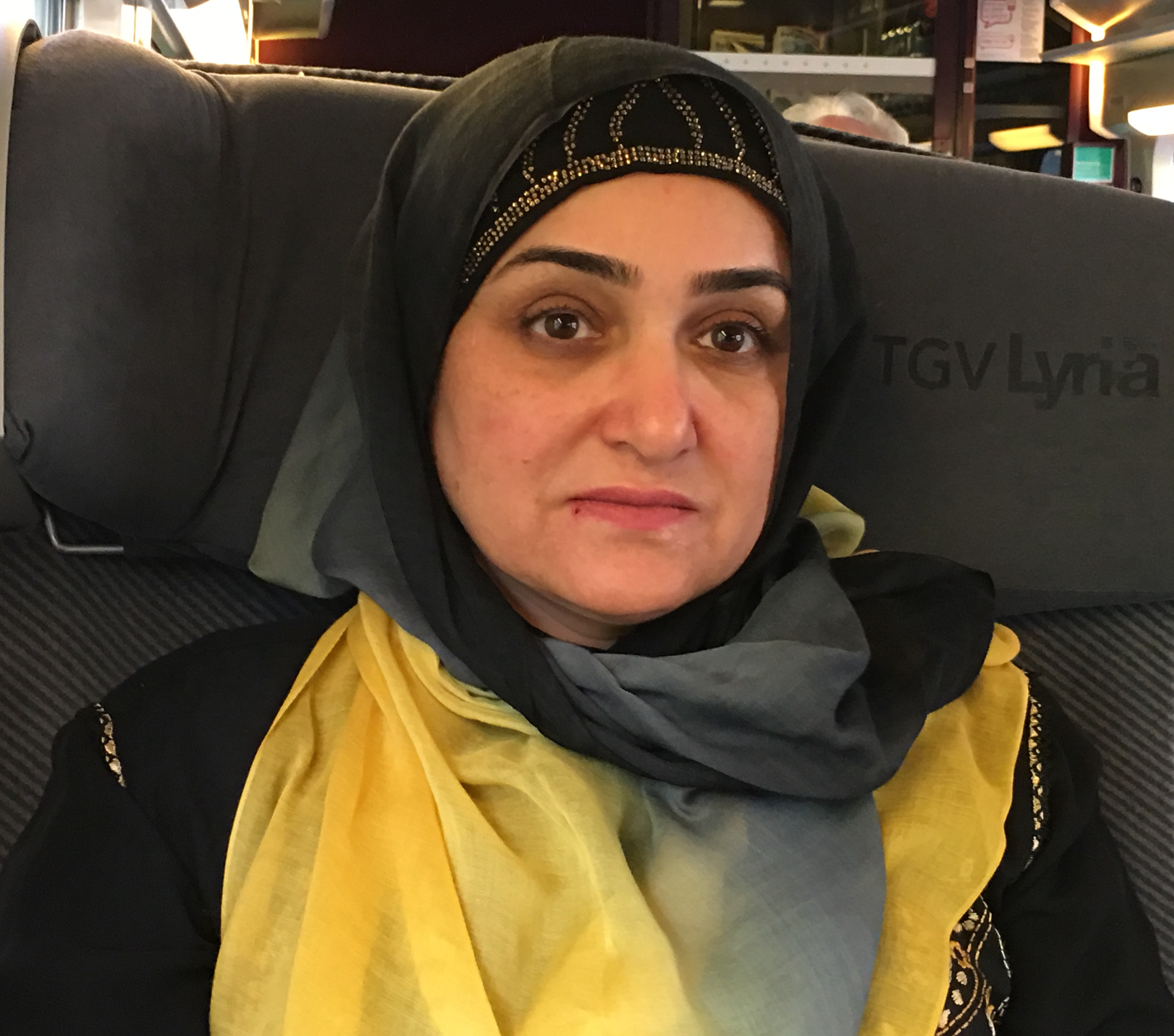
- Aziz in 2016

Member of the Afghanistan Parliament for Kunduz province
- In office 2005 – 12 March 2021

Personal details
- Born: 1973 Kunduz, Afghanistan
- Died: 12 March 2021 (age 47-48) Switzerland
- Party: Independent
- Children: 4
- Education: Kabul Medical University
- Occupation: Politician, physician

Fatima Aziz (Dari: فاطمه عزیز; Pashto: فاطمهٔ عزيز; 1973 – 12 March 2021) was an Afghan physician and politician. In 2005, she was elected to the lower house of parliament as representative of Kunduz province in Afghanistan's first free parliamentary election in decades. She was re-elected in the 2010 and 2018 elections. She served as an MP until her death from cancer in 2021.

== Early life and education ==
Fatima Aziz was born in 1973 in the province of Kunduz, Afghanistan. In 1987, she completed her secondary school education at Naswan High School in Kunduz. She earned a bachelor of medicine from Kabul Medical University in 1993.

== Career ==
For 13 years, Aziz worked in maternal–fetal medicine in Wazir Akbar Khan and Malalai hospitals in Kabul. She also worked for non-governmental organizations and the UNHCR. In the aftermath of the 2001 Afghan War, Aziz was elected as an independent member of parliament (MP) to the lower house of parliament, representing Kunduz province. She was part of the 2002 loya jirga. During the Wolesi Jirga 2005 election, Aziz received 4,725 votes. She was deputy chairwoman of the communications, transportation, city development, and municipalities committee. Aziz was re-elected in subsequent elections during the Afghan Peace Jirga 2010 and 2018. She was one of the first women elected to the National Assembly after the fall of the Taliban.

Known for her liberal stances and advocacy of gender equality, her comments in parliament attracted controversy. As representative of Kunduz, Aziz criticised the National Directorate of Security after a series of coordinated Taliban attacks in 2012. She provided information to the international media during the Battle of Kunduz in 2015. She fled the city with her family due to the battle. While the city was occupied by the Taliban, she campaigned for the city's liberation to the Afghan government and international community, while drawing attention to the humanitarian situation on the ground. Aziz said that voter turnout in Kunduz for the 2019 Afghan presidential election was low due to problems with security in the region. During the COVID-19 pandemic in Afghanistan, she believed corruption and government failures caused a shortage in oxygen tanks.

== Personal life and death ==
Aziz's first language was Dari and she also spoke Pashto, English, and Urdu. She was married to an engineer and had two daughters and two sons. Her brother was a representative in Kunduz's Ministry of the Economy. In 2020, Aziz tested positive for COVID-19, and posted a video of her online in bed with an oxygen tube. She died of cancer on 12 March 2021, in a hospital in Switzerland.
