= Zakim =

Zakim is a surname and a given name. Notable people with the name include:

- Zakim Shah (Afghan election official), the chairman of Afghanistan's Joint Election Management Board
- Zakim Shah (Guantanamo captive 898)
- Josh Zakim (born 1983), American politician, attorney, and community activist
- Leonard P. Zakim (1953–1999), Jewish American religious and civil rights leader

== See also ==
- Leonard P. Zakim Bunker Hill Memorial Bridge across the Charles River in Boston, Massachusetts
