= Zakim Shah =

Zakim Shah may refer to:

- Zakim Shah (Afghan election official), is the chairman or director of Afghanistan's Joint Election Management Board
- Zakim Shah (Guantanamo captive 898), captured in December 2002, based on a false denunciation
