= Mir Rahman Rahmani =

Afghan politician and businessman

- میررحمان رحماني
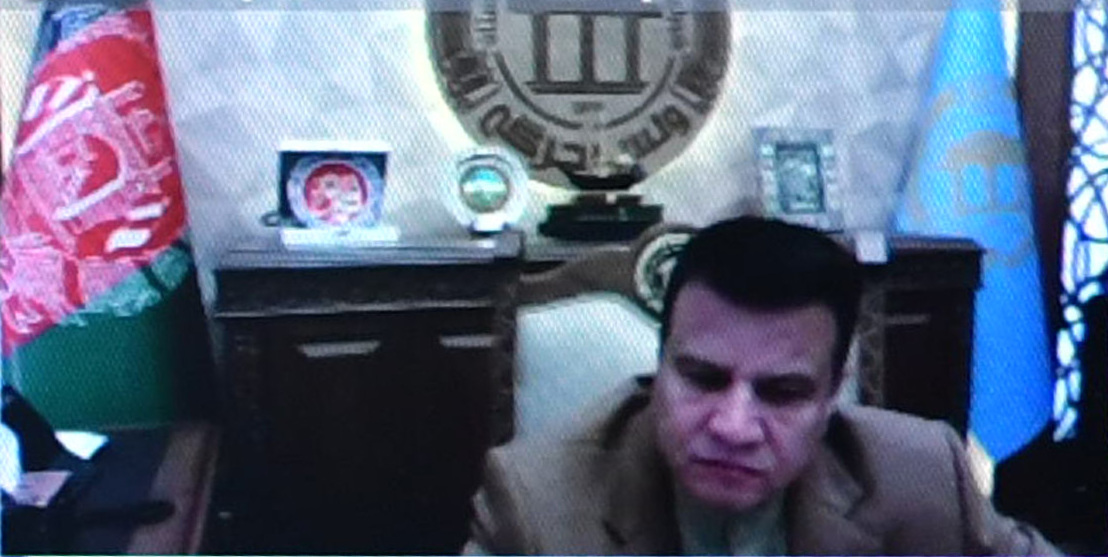
- Rahmani in 2020

Speaker of the House of the People
- In office 29 June 2019 – 15 August 2021
- President: Ashraf Ghani
- Deputy: Amir Khan Yar (First Deputy); Ahmad Shah Ramazan (Second Deputy)
- Preceded by: Abdul Rauf Ibrahimi

Member of the House of the People
- In office 26 April 2019 – 15 August 2021
- Constituency: Parwan Province

Personal details
- Born: 1962 (age 63–64) Bagram, Parwan Province, Afghanistan
- Children: 6
- Occupation: politician; businessman
- Ethnicity: Tajik

Mir Rahman Rahmani (Pashto: میررحمان رحماني, Dari: میر رحمان رحمانی; born 1962) is an Afghan politician and businessman who was the de jure Speaker of Afghanistan's House of the People (Wolesi Jirga, the House of Representatives), holding the office since June 2019, until his flight from Afghanistan in 2021. He has been a member of the Wolesi Jirga since 2010.

On 29 June 2019, he was elected as Speaker of the Wolesi Jirga, receiving 136 votes; the other candidate, Mohammad Wardak, received 96 votes.

Following the fall of Kabul into the control of the Taliban, Rahmani was obliged to leave Afghanistan. In addition to his Afghan nationality, he also holds a Cypriot passport.

Ajmal Rahmani, a son of Mir Rahman Rahmani, also a businessman, is reported to have made hundreds of millions of euros worth of real estate investments in Germany. Mir Rahman Rahmani himself denied being involved in entrepreneurial activities or those of his son.

== Sanctions ==
Rahmani, his son Ajmal and 44 associated entities were sanctioned by the United States Department of the Treasury in December 2023 for misappropriating millions of dollars of US support to Afghanistan before the 2020–2021 U.S. withdrawal. The Rahmanis are alleged to have enriched themselves by selling overpriced fuel to the former Afghan National Defense and Security Forces, not delivering the agreed amounts by at least 11,000,000 litres and avoiding taxation of imported fuel through their company network by paying bribes to individuals in the Afghanistan Customs Department. The Treasury also sanctioned various companies, believed to be under Rahmanis control, the majority of those are listed in Germany. Mir Rahman Rahmani is also alleged to have paid millions of dollars to multiple members of Afghan parliament throughout the parliamentary speakership elections in 2018 to secure their votes for his bid for Speaker of Parliament.

The Rahmanis motion for a preliminary injunction against the Treasury was dismissed in April 2024.

== Sources ==
Murtaza Hussain:A powerful former U.S. contractor is silencing critical press coverage, dropsitenews.com, 31. December 2024
