= New Afghanistan Party =

Political party

New Afghanistan Party (Dari: حزب افغانستان نوین, Hezb-e Afghanistan Naween or Naveen) is a political party in Afghanistan led by Yunus Qanuni. The party was founded in 2004, as Qanuni moved away from the National Movement of Afghanistan.

In April 2005 Qanuni formed the National Understanding Front of Afghanistan as a broad opposition alliance. However, the front became inactive after a couple of months. In December 2005 an agreement was reached between Qanuni and Burhanuddin Rabbani, and the party and a section of the National Movement of Afghanistan would merge into Jamiat-e Islami. By 2006 there were conflicting reports on whether the merger had actually been effective.

== Electoral history ==
=== Presidential elections ===
Election	Party candidate	Votes	%	Result
2004	Yunus Qanuni	1,306,503	16.3%	Lost ✗

=== National Assembly elections ===
Election	Party leader	Seats	+/–	Position
2005	Yunus Qanuni	13 / 249	▲13	▲3rd
2010	Yunus Qanuni	1 / 249	▼12	▼18th
