= Xinkai (disambiguation) =

Xinkai (新凯汽车) is a Chinese car manufacturer.

Xinkai (新开) may also refer to:

== Populated places ==
- Xinkai, Huangmei, a town in Huangmei County, Hebei Province
- Xinkai, Panjin, a town in Panjin City, Liaoning Province
- Xinkai, Yueyang, a town in Yueyang County, Hunan Province
- Xinkai Village, in Daxin, Jiangsu
- Xinkai Village, in Fukou, Lianyuan City, Hunan Province
- Xinkai Village, in Liucun, Beijing
- Xinkai Village, in Longfu, Liuyang City, Hunan Province

== Other ==
- Xinkai River, a tributary of northeast China's Liao River

== See also ==
- Lake Khanka or Lake Xingkai, a freshwater lake on the border between Russia and northeast China
- Shinkai (disambiguation)
