= Shafiqa Habibi =

Afghan journalist

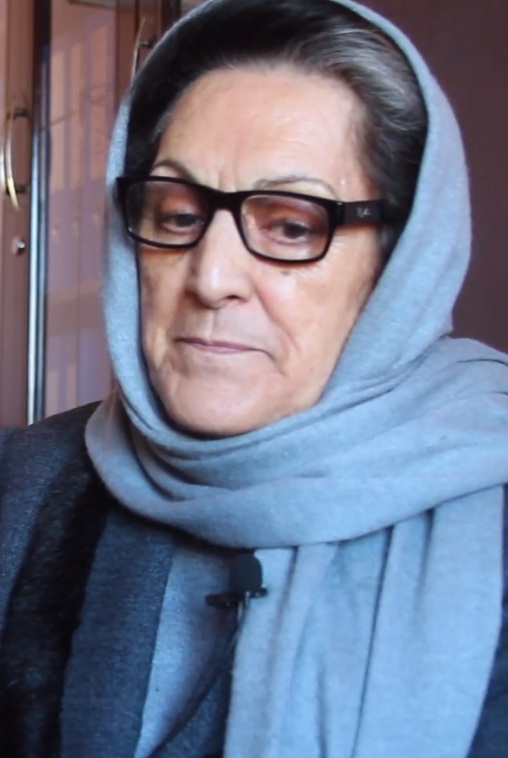
- Shafiqa Habibi talks to Hasht-e Subh Daily, 8 March 2019
- Born: 1941 (age 84–85); Kabul, Kingdom of Afghanistan
- Occupations: journalist, television anchor, activist and politician
- Years active: 1961–

Shafiqa Habibi is a journalist, television anchor, activist, and politician from Afghanistan. She is known for her work to support women journalists, and for her 2004 candidacy for Vice President of Afghanistan as the running mate of Abdul Rashid Dostum.

== Personal life ==
Shafiqa Habibi is from an affluent Ahmedzai Pashtun family. Although she grew up in Kabul, her family is from Logar province. In 1966, Habibi obtained a degree in journalism from Kabul University. She is married to Mahmoud Habibi, who served in various positions in the Afghanistan government. These roles included information minister to King Zahir Shah, and president of the Afghan senate under President Mohammad Najibullah. When the Mujahideen took control of Kabul in 1992, she and her husband briefly moved to Mazar-e-Sharif, along with hundreds of thousands of others. When the United States began bombing Kabul in 2001, Habibi fled to the city of Peshawar, in Pakistan.

== Journalism, activism, and politics ==
Soon after getting her degree, Habibi began working for Radio Afghanistan. She also read poetry on television. She was also a television anchor, and a founder of the Women's Journalist Center. As of October 2016, Habibi was the head of the Afghan Women's Journalist Union.

In 1994, Habibi founded the Women's Radio and Television Broadcast Organization, to support women journalists. When the Taliban came to power in 1996, she was prevented from making news broadcasts. During the five years of the Taliban government, she organized "craft schools", at which women could manufacture handicrafts that could later be sold. She also founded an underground women's organization. While the Taliban held power in Afghanistan, Habibi secretly ran 8 home schools for girls, which were kept secret from the government. After the Taliban was overthrown in 2001, she worked for the Afghan Independent Human Rights Commission.

In 2004, Habibi was a candidate for Vice President of Afghanistan, as the running mate of Abdul Rashid Dostum, a general in the Afghan army. She was one of three women in that year's presidential race. Habibi is the director of the non-governmental organization New Afghanistan Women Association, which investigates cases of sexual violence. Habibi has states that the Afghan government is indifferent towards sexual violence against women, and is to blame for rising rates of such violence.

== Awards and recognition ==
Habibi is known as a campaigner for human-rights and as a public intellectual. In 2002, she won the Ida B. Wells Bravery in Journalism Award. Also in 2002, the non-profit organization Women's eNews named Habibi as one of "21 Leaders for 21st Century" in 2002, for her work as a journalist covering women's rights, and also for organizing other women journalists. In 2005, she was among a thousand women nominated for the Nobel Peace Prize. In 2021 the book about her The Laureate of All Orators was written.
