= Yunus Qanuni =

Afghan politician (born 1957)

Yunus Qanuni یونس قانونی
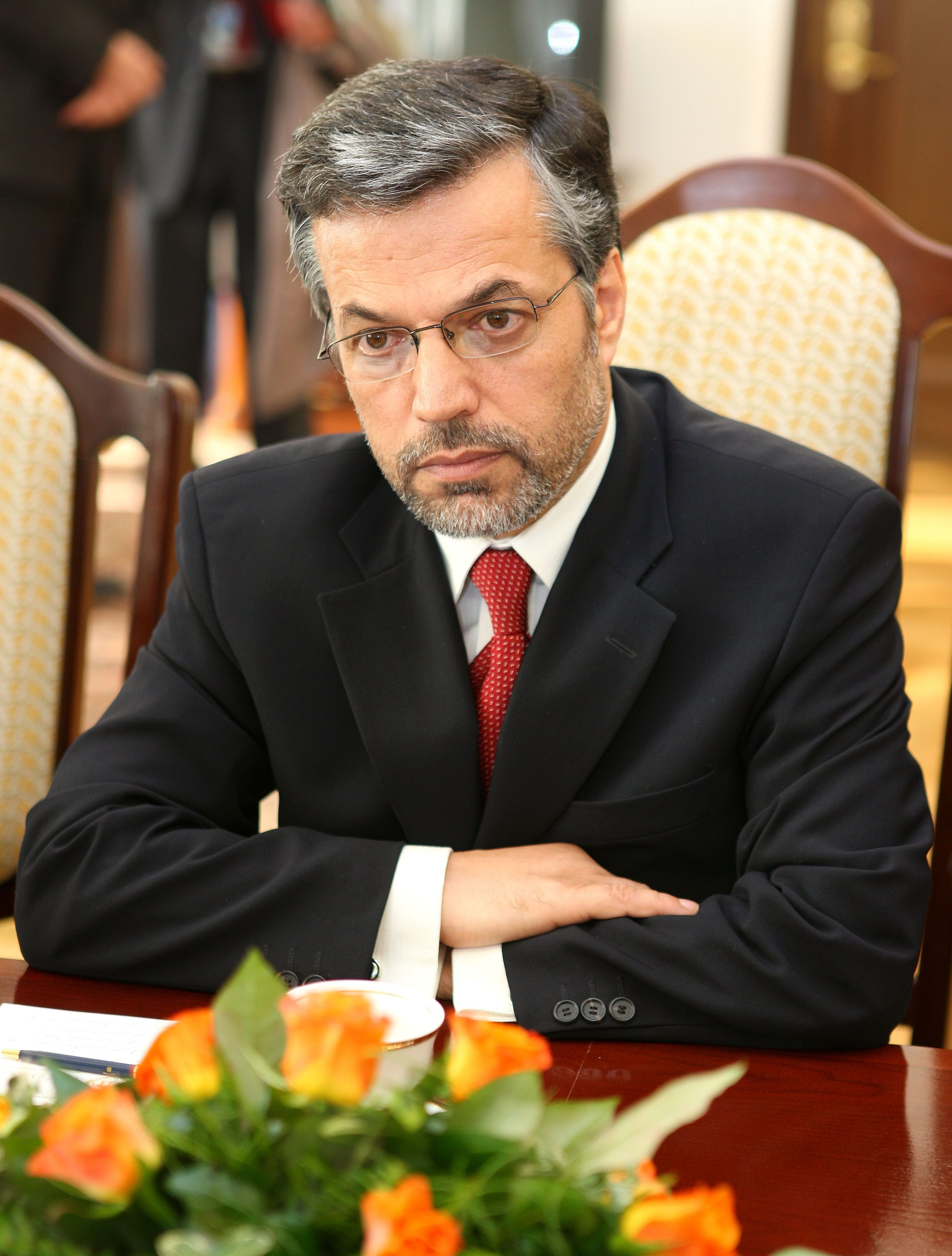

1st Vice President of Afghanistan
- In office 11 March – 29 September 2014
- President: Hamid Karzai
- Preceded by: Mohammed Fahim
- Succeeded by: Abdul Rashid Dostum

Speaker of the House of the People
- In office 7 December 2005 – 6 December 2010
- Deputy: Mirwais Yasini
- Preceded by: Position established
- Succeeded by: Abdul Rauf Ibrahimi

Minister of Interior Affairs
- In office 13 November 2001 – 24 June 2002
- President: Hamid Karzai
- Preceded by: Abdur Razzaq Akhundzada
- Succeeded by: Taj Mohammed Wardak

Personal details
- Born: 1957 (age 68–69) Panjshir, Kingdom of Afghanistan
- Party: New Afghanistan Party

Yunus Qanuni (Dari: یونس قانونی, born on 10 May 1957) is an Afghan politician who served as Vice President of Afghanistan in 2014, and as Minister of Interior Affairs from 2001 to 2002. He placed second in the 2004 presidential election.

== Early life ==
Yunus Qanuni was born in the Panjshir Province in 1957, and is a Tajik.

== Career ==
Qanuni opposed Mohammad Daoud Khan, who overthrew King Mohammad Zahir Shah. He joined the military forces of Ahmad Shah Massoud. In 1993, he became Minister of Defense in Burhanuddin Rabbani's government. Qanuni was a founding member of the Supreme Council for the Defence of the Motherland, which later became the Northern Alliance, in 1996. Qanuni gave the funeral oration for Massoud, the military leader of the Northern Alliance, in 2001.

In 2001, the Bonn Agreement established the Afghan Interim Administration. The selection of interim leader was contentious and Qanuni, Abdullah Abdullah, and Abdul Satar Sirat were considered before Hamid Karzai was selected as a compromise candidate. Quanuni was made Minister of the Interior Affairs. Karzai lowered Qanuni to be Minister of Education in 2002; this was done to increase the number of Pashtuns in power.

Qanuni resigned as Minister of Education to run in the 2004 presidential election, but placed second to Karzai. He performed best in the Panjshir Province.

On 21 December 2005, Qanuni was president of the House of the People against Abdulrab Rasul Sayyaf, who had the support of Karzai. The New Afghanistan Party was formed by Qanuni in 2009.

== Personal life ==
Qanuni was wounded by a car bombing in Kabul in 1993.

== Works cited ==
=== Books ===
- Afghanistan: From Presidential to Parliamentary Elections. International Crisis Group. 2004.
- Gentilni, Fernado (2013). Afghan Lessons: Culture, Diplomacy, and Counterinsurgency. Brookings Institution. ISBN 9780815724230.
- Jalali, Ali (2017). A Military History of Afghanistan: From the Great Game to the Global War on Terror. University Press of Kansas. ISBN 9780700624089.
- Saikal, Amin (2024). How to Lose a War: The Story of America's Intervention in Afghanistan. Yale University Press. ISBN 9780300277661.

=== Journals ===
- "Chronology October 16, 2005 - January 15, 2006". The Middle East Journal. 60 (2). Middle East Institute: 329–358. 2006. doi:10.2307/4330252. JSTOR 4330252.

=== News ===
- "Karzai foe to head Afghan lower house". Al Jazeera English. 21 December 2005. Archived from the original on 6 November 2026.
- "Karzai's Rival Forms National-Level Political Party". Voice of America. 28 October 2009. Archived from the original on 6 November 2026.
- "Profile: Yunus Qanuni". BBC News. 10 September 2004. Archived from the original on 5 February 2007.
- Oliver, Mark; Brown, Derek (3 December 2001). "Who's who in Afghanistan". The Guardian. Archived from the original on 6 November 2026.

== External sources ==
- Biography: Mohammad Yunis Qanuni
- Profile: Yunus Qanuni; BBC; 9/10/2004
