= Shakiba Hashemi =

Afghan politician

Shakiba Matin Hashemi is an Afghan politician who was elected to represent Kandahar Province in Afghanistan's Wolesi Jirga, the lower house of its National Legislature, in 2005.

A report on Kandahar prepared at the Navy Postgraduate School stated that Hashemi sits on the Environment Committee; that she was a school principal prior to taking office; that her father sits on Kandahar's Provincial Council; and that she is a member of the National United Party of Afghanistan.

Hashemi was re-elected in 2010 with 641 votes. She was outspoken against Ahmed Wali Karzai and claimed to have been threatened by him. She also spoke out against corruption, saying she was offered, and rejected, a bribe prior to the election.

In 2012, Hashemi was a member of a parliamentary fact-finding mission investigating the Kandahar massacre on 11 March 2012 in Panjwayi District. Hashemi and Hamidzi Lali claimed that US troopers had raped two women before the massacre. The U.S. Army concluded that staff sergeant Robert Bales was the only person responsible for the shootings.

In 2016, Hashemi was thanked by the Election and Transparency Watch Organization of Afghanistan for her contribution to the implementation of a program called "Enhancing Women's Status at the Local Level by Creating Better Links to Female Parliamentarians."
