= Peace and National Unity Party of Afghanistan =

Defunct political party

Peace and National Unity Party of Afghanistan (Dari: حزب صلح و وحدت ملی افغانستان) is a political party in Afghanistan. The party was founded by a former Islamic Party of Afghanistan commander from Ghor, Abdulqader Emami Ghori.

Ghori was removed from his post as party leader in 2005, and replaced by Dr. Nisar Ahmad Ahmadzai.
