= Nilofar Ibrahimi =

Afghan gynecologist and politician

Nilofar Ibrahimi is an Afghan gynecologist and former politician who has served as a member of the Parliament of Afghanistan.

Nilofar Ibrahimi was an orphan.

She was elected as an MP of the Afghan Parliament for the North Province (Badakhshan). She was elected to the Parliament of Afghanistan in 2010. She was reelected to Parliament in 2018.

She created the ZamZam Foundation for orphans in 2019.

She was featured in a documentary by Afghan film maker Sedika Mojadidi.

She was the recipient of the 2022 CRS Geoff McPherson Scholarship Awards.
