= Azadeh Akhlaghi =

Iranian photographer and visual artist (born 1978)

Azadeh Akhlaghi (Persian: آزاده اخلاقی; born 1978) is an Iranian photographer and visual artist, known primarily for her large-scale, staged photography. Her artwork centers on contemporary Iranian history, collective memory, and the reconstruction of undocumented political events in the Middle East.

Akhlaghi won the UN-Habitat Youth Photography Competition in 2009, was a Sovereign Arts Prize Finalist in 2016, and received the Robert Gardner Fellowship in Photography at Harvard University's Peabody Museum of Archaeology & Ethnology in 2019.

== Early life and education ==
Akhlaghi was born in 1978 in Shiraz, Iran, and grew up in Mashhad. Her mother, Beti Nejati, was a teacher and artist. After working in reformist journalism as a university student, Akhlaghi moved to Australia, where she lived for eight years and became a citizen in 2004. She attended the Royal Melbourne Institute of Technology (RMIT), graduating with a Master of Arts in Computer Science, while also taking elective courses in photography and cinema. She returned to Iran in 2005.

== Career ==
From 2005 to 2008, Akhlaghi worked as an assistant director for filmmakers Abbas Kiarostami and Manijeh Hekmat. She also directed and produced short films that screened at the Berkeley Art Museum and film festivals in Oslo and Pusan.

=== By an Eye-Witness (2009–2013) ===
Akhlaghi's first major series, By an Eye-Witness, consists of 17 large-scale photographic reconstructions of unrecorded, controversial deaths of prominent twentieth-century Iranian figures. Based on three years of archival research, the scenes were filmed under alternate pretexts due to local restrictions. In 16 of the images, Akhlaghi appears in the frame as an anachronistic bystander wearing a red shawl. The series debuted at Tehran's Mohsen Gallery and was later shown internationally, including at the M.F. Hussain Gallery in New Delhi.

=== From Iran: A Visual Testimony (2026) ===
Supported by the 2019 Robert Gardner Fellowship, Akhlaghi developed From Iran: A Visual Testimony, an exhibition that opened at Harvard's Peabody Museum in May 2026. The project features 16 large-scale panoramic images staging 11 historical events between 1908 and 1979.

Akhlaghi has participated in exhibitions and biennials at Somerset House in London, the Museum of Contemporary Photography in Chicago, Paris Photo, the Shanghai and Seoul Biennials, and the Tehran Museum of Contemporary Art.
