= National Congress of Afghanistan =

National Congress of Afghanistan کنگره ملی افغانستان
- Leader: Abdul Latif Pedram
- Founded: 2004
- Preceded by: SAFZA
- Ideology: Secularism; Liberalism; Federalism
- Political position: Centre
- Colors: Black and white
- Seats in the Leadership Council: 0 / 30

Party flag
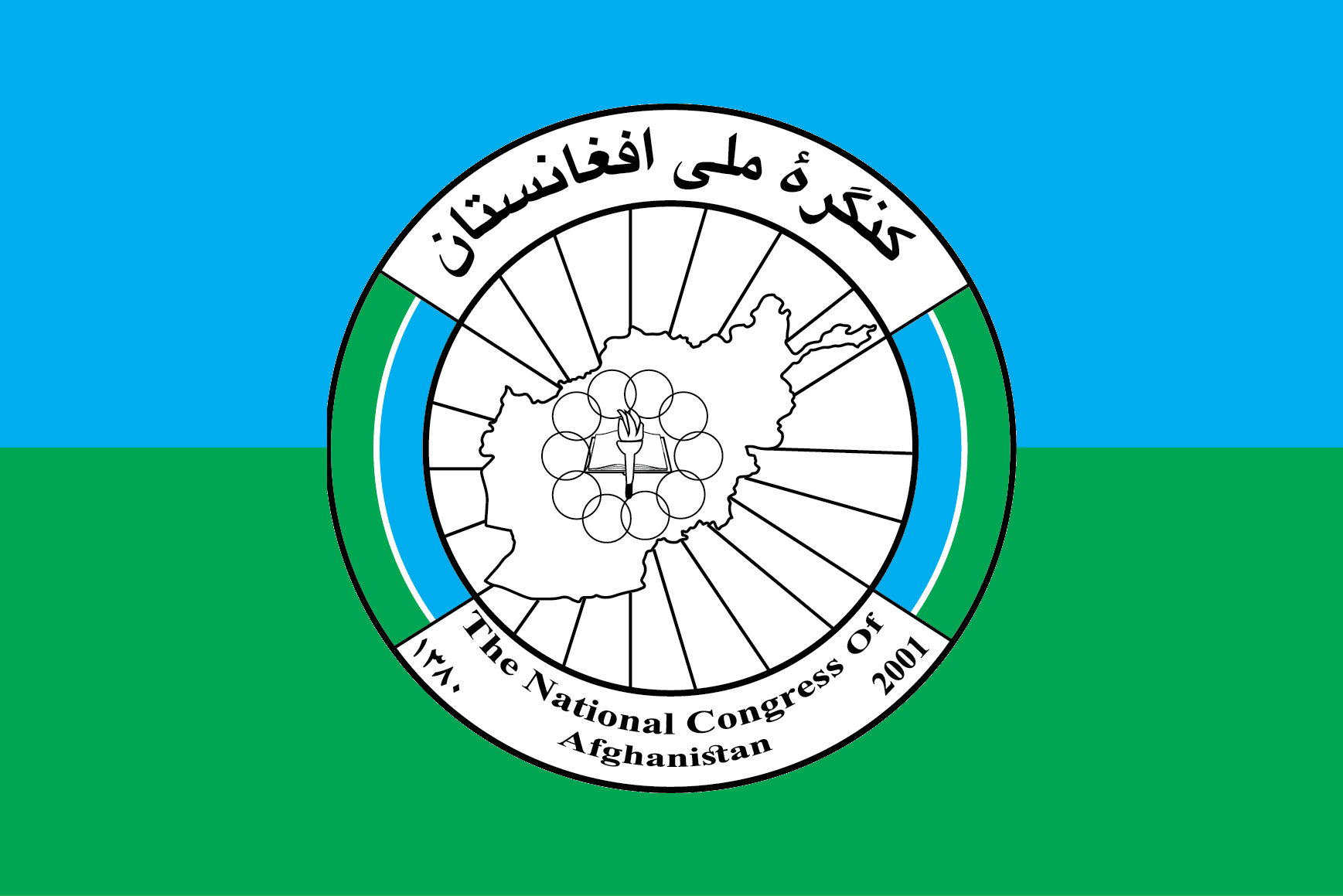

Website
- http://mouv.national.afghan.free.fr/

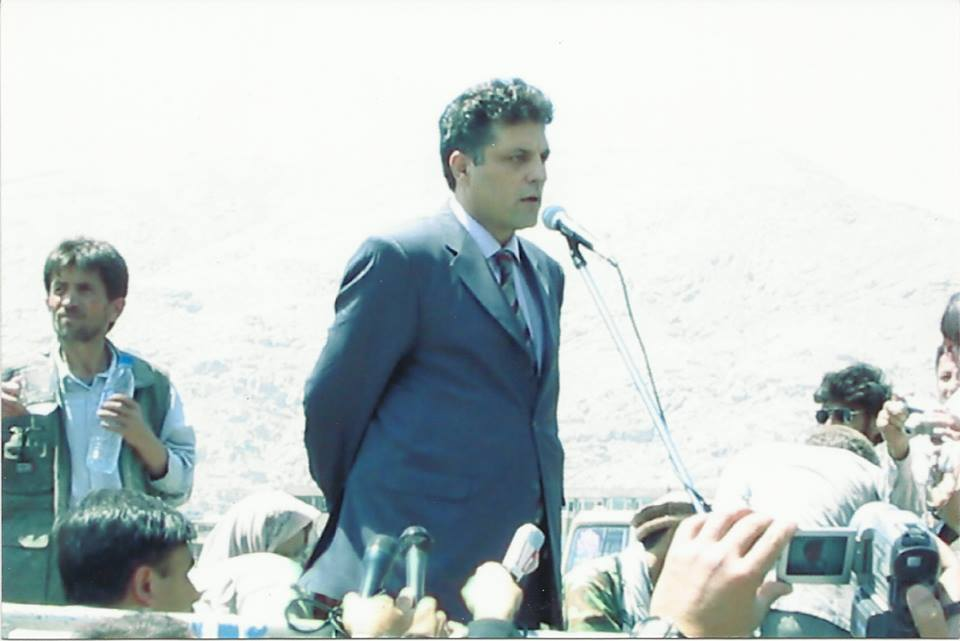
Abdul Latif Pedram, leader of the party

The National Congress of Afghanistan (Note: Persian: حزب کنگره ملی افغانستان, romanized: Hezb-e Kongra-ye Millī-ye Afghānistān) (NCA) is a centrist political party in Afghanistan. The party was formed in 2001 and was one of the only liberal secular Afghan parties.

The leader of this party is Abdul Latif Pedram who was an opponent of the communist, Islamist and Taliban regimes. Pedram is also a critic of Hamid Karzai's government.

== History ==
As the party leader, Pedram, was a candidate in Afghanistan's 2004 presidential election and received the fifth most votes. Unlike other political parties in Afghanistan, the National Congress of Afghanistan has remained firm and united.

== Ideology ==
The NCA supports secularism, federalism and decentralization in Afghanistan. Pedram denounces corruption and strongly opposes Islamic fundamentalism. He advocates an independent, but decentralized Afghanistan, and believes that the country should be divided into autonomous regions under the control of regional capitals.
