= Abdul Latif Pedram =

Afghan politician (born 1963)

Abdul Latif Pedram عبداللطيف پدرام
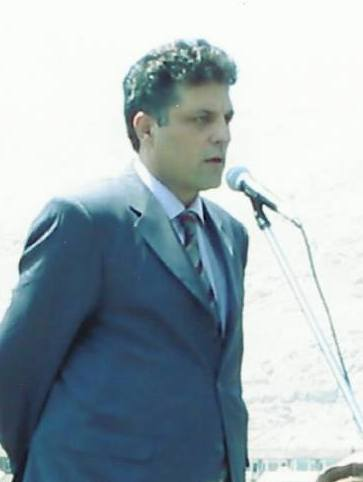
- Abdul Latif Pedram c. 2014

Personal details
- Born: 29 July 1963 (age 63) Maimay, Badakhshan, Kingdom of Afghanistan
- Party: National Congress of Afghanistan
- Other political affiliations: Organisation of Toilers' Fedayan of Afghanistan
- Occupation: Politician and Parliamentarian
- Profession: Writer, Professor, Historian, Poet, Journalist and Politician
- Ethnicity: Pamiri and Tajik

Abdul Latif Pedram (Note: Dari: عبداللطيف پدرام) (born 29 July 1963) is an Afghan politician who is the leader of the National Congress of Afghanistan (NCP) since 2001. He was one of the nine representatives of Badakhshan province in the lower house of parliament.

He campaigned for women's personal rights in Afghanistan and also served as member of parliament. His hometown fell to the Taliban prior to Kabul. He has since been living in exile.

== Early life ==
Born in Maimay, Badakhshan on 29 July 1963 to a Persian-speaking Tajik and Pamiri family, Latīf Pedrām is a writer, poet, journalist, and professor of Persian literature. He was director of the library of the Hakīm Nāṣer Ḫoṣrow Balḫī Cultural Center.

First a supporter of the communist government, he soon began to openly criticize and oppose the Soviet occupation of Afghanistan and turned toward Ahmad Shah Massoud. He stayed in Afghanistan during most of the war years, moving around the country to be able to pursue his activities. Latīf Pedrām was finally forced into exile by the advance of the Taliban. Before returning to Afghanistan after the demise of the Taliban in 2001, he lived for a while in France, where he studied political sciences and attempted to promote Afghanistan's Persian poetry and literature.

== Political career ==
=== Presidential elections 2004 ===
Pedram received the fifth most votes during the 2004 elections, with approximately 1.4% of the total ballots counted, and approximately 17% of the ballots in his home province Badakhshan - being the strongest of the small candidates. Following the outcome, he criticized the government and the results, saying that "large-scale fraud had occurred", which was "completely shameful." Prior to the votes, Pedram had argued that the presidential election should be delayed because of insecurity and to arrange for the whole Afghan diaspora to vote.

=== 2008 controversy ===
In February 2008, an alleged audio recording of Pedram was aired by various TV channels in Afghanistan, claiming that Pedram had "disrespected" and "insulted" former King of Afghanistan, Amanullah Khan, who is regarded as a "national hero" by many in the country. However, in an interview on Khorasan TV he denied this claim and said that his voice was tampered with. This led to hot editorial crossfires among the press and in the Parliament and Cabinet, echoing with ethnic conflicts when ethnic blocks were identified supporting and criticizing Pedram. Following this, the government of Afghanistan tried banning the National Congress of Afghanistan and ordered that "comments about former kings, the president and Jihadi leaders are not allowed." Since the incident, Pedram lived under house arrest in Kabul until November 2008. While expressing its concern regarding the regression of democracy in Afghanistan one year before the 2009 presidential elections, the International Federation for Human Rights (FIDH) called for the unconditional release of Abdul Latif Pedram.

=== 2009 Presidential election ===
In January 2009 an article by Aḥmad Madjidyar of the American Enterprise Institute included Pedrām on a list of fifteen possible candidates in the controversial 2009 Afghan Presidential election. Preliminary results placed Pedrām eleventh in a field of 38 candidates and according to the controversial Independent Election Committee (IEC), he ultimately received 0.34% of the votes. According to IEC results, Pedrām received 6,686 votes in his home province of Badakhshan, considerably lower than the 33,510 votes he received during the 2004 presidential election.

=== 2010 Parliamentary election ===
In the 2010 Afghan parliamentary election, Pedram received 8,469 votes in Badakhshan, being the third representative from that province to be elected to the parliament, after Fawzia Koofi and Zalmai Mojadidi.

== Views ==
Latif Pedram is the founder and leader of National Congress of Afghanistan and the founder of the Tajik Council of Afghanistan. Tajiks constituted the main anti-Taliban fighting force in the past, known as Northern Alliance or United Islamic Front for Salvation of Afghanistan. Latif Pedram's political vision is to empower the human rights of minorities like Pashayis, Parachis, Hazaras and other ethnicities and to promote equality, brotherhood among the different ethnicities and possibly even a name change of the country from Afghanistan to a non-tribal name (Khorasan).

Latīf Pedrām is a strong supporter of secularism, federalism and decentralization in Afghanistan. He denounces corruption and strongly opposes Islamic fundamentalism. He advocates an independent, but decentralized Afghanistan, and believes that the country should be divided into autonomous regions under the control of regional capitals.

Although his party is multi-ethnic and is, so far, the only opposition party that is not linked to an armed group, he is regarded by some as a secular Eastern Khorasani civic-progressive nationalist politician. Perhaps his most controversial statement is the demand for a name-change in Afghanistan. In many publications and articles, he proposed the change of the name "Afghanistan" to "Khorasan", the medieval name of the region, in order to settle some inter-ethnic feuds. His statement is based on the fact that the current name of the country is synonymous with "Land of Pashtuns".

== Awards ==
Pedram has received several international awards, including:

- The Prix Hellman-Helmet (Hellman-Helmet Prize) by Human Rights Watch in July 1999
- A special grant from Reporters sans Frontières in December 1998

He is also an honorary member of:

- The International Parliament of Writers and a guest of the city of Suresnes in France
- The "Association of the Persian speakers of the World" ("Peyvand") and member of the board of editors of Peyvand journal

== Quotes ==
It is obvious for everyone that Karzai could not get 15 percent of the votes if the election had been fair [...] Now if Karzai or anybody else becomes the president of the country as a result of this election, he will be a false president. - Comment on the presidential elections in October 2004

The previous Taliban foreign affairs minister, Wakil Ahmed Mutawakel [...] and many other [Taliban] are living openly in Kabul. Some of these leaders and other [in]famous murderers during the Taliban regime have seats in the National Assembly. Under these conditions, Afghans have the right also to wonder what the foreign forces are doing in their country.

As a non-religious and multiethnic movement, our project is based on a national economic cohesion so that all Afghan ethnic groups participate in the national decision-making. But we have to recognize the realities: the province of Herat and the province of Paktia, live a century apart from each other; if the fundamentalists who are powerful in certain provinces of the south oppose the opening of schools in the territory they control, why allow them to impose their rule in other more advanced provinces!? - Comment on Afghan president Hamid Karzai's remarks to "invite moderate Taliban into Afghanistan's new government".
