= Saifora Niazi =

- Born: 1962 (age 63–64); Mazar-i-Sharif, Balkh Province, Afghanistan

Saifora Niazi was born in 1962 in Mazar-i-Sharif, Balkh Province, Afghanistan. She finished her secondary education at Sultain Razia High School before going on to complete a bachelor's degree in Physics at Kabul University.

After graduating, Niazi worked as a teacher before reaching the position of principal at Sultan Razia High School. She was also head of the Department of Women's Affairs in Balkh Province.

In 2005, Niazi successfully ran for parliament under the Jamiat-e-Islami. She successfully ran again in 2010. Niazi is part of the Religious and Cultural Affairs Commission and the Education and Higher Education commission.
