= Abdul Rahim Ayoubi =

Afghan politician (born 1982)

- عبــدالرحــیم ایــوبـي
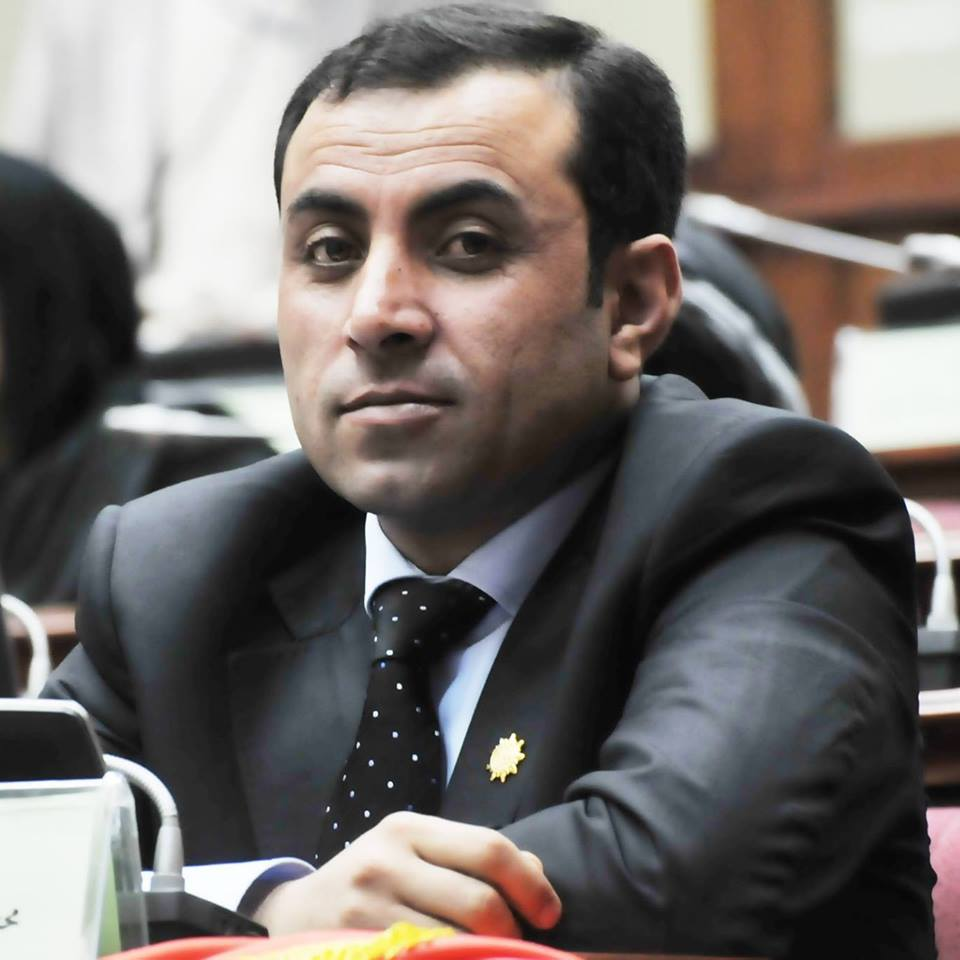

Member of the House of the People of Afghanistan
- In office 2010–2016

President of the Afghanistan United Nation Party

Personal details
- Born: 1982 (age 43–44) Kandahar, Afghanistan
- Party: Afghanistan United Nation Party
- Profession: Politician
- Awards: Kandahar University (honorary Doctorate Degree in Political Science)

Abdul Rahim Ayoubi (Pashto: عبــدالرحــیم ايوبي; born 1982) is a politician in Afghanistan who was a member of Afghan Parliament from 2010 until 2016 and the president of the Afghanistan United Nation Party. In the previous election Ayoubi supported Ashraf Ghani.

== Biography ==
Abdul Rahim Ayoubi is the son of Abdul Karim Ayoubi and was born in 1982 in the Arghistan District, Kandahar Province. His grandfather, Malik Salih Mohammad Ayoubi, was the leader of the Popalzai tribe. He graduated from a high school in Pakistan, where he lived for some years as a refugee, and in 2010, graduated from Merwais High School in Kandahar. Ayoubi also studied at the Science College in Quetta, Pakistan, graduating in 1998. He speaks Pashto, Dari, Urdu and English. Ayoubi was in the Ministry of Interior from 2000 to 2008), and then he joined the Police army and was a commander in Ghazni, Zabul, Kandahar, and Helmand. He founded Kakar Construction and Logistics Company in 2009 and was the deputy chairman of the Solution Logistics Company in 2012. He became a member of the Wolesi Jirga in 2010.
