= National Sovereignty Party =

Political party in South Korea

- Abbreviation: Sovereignty Party
- Leader: Park Jun-ui, Gu San-ha
- Founded: 28 December 2023
- Split from: Progressive Party
- Headquarters: 15, Mapo-daero, Mapo-gu, Seoul
- Membership (2024): 5,135
- Ideology: Progressivism
- Political position: Left-wing
- Colors: Sky blue
- Slogan: Impeachment of Yoon Seok-yeol, direct politics of the people Let's implement candlelight reform
- National Assembly: 0 / 300
- Metropolitan Mayors and Governors: 0 / 16
- Municipal Mayors: 0 / 227
- Provincial and Metropolitan Councillors: 0 / 933
- Municipal Councillors: 0 / 3,034

Website
- Website

Korean name
- Hangul: 국민주권당
- Hanja: 國民主權黨
- RR: Gungmin jugwondang
- MR: Kungmin chukwŏndang

The National Sovereignty Party (Korean: 국민주권당) is a national liberation progressive political party founded in 2023. The party was founded by former members of the Progressive Party. It advocates for popular sovereign democracy and direct democracy, which aims for the people to directly lead politics.

== Election results ==
National Assembly
| Year | Election | Constituency | | Proportional representation | | Total | |
| Year | Election | Elected | Share | Elected | Vote share | Elected | Share |
|---|---|---|---|---|---|---|---|
| 2024 | 22nd | 0/254 | 0% | — | — | 0/300 | 0% |
