= Shinkai Karokhail =

Afghan politician

- شينکۍ کړوخېل
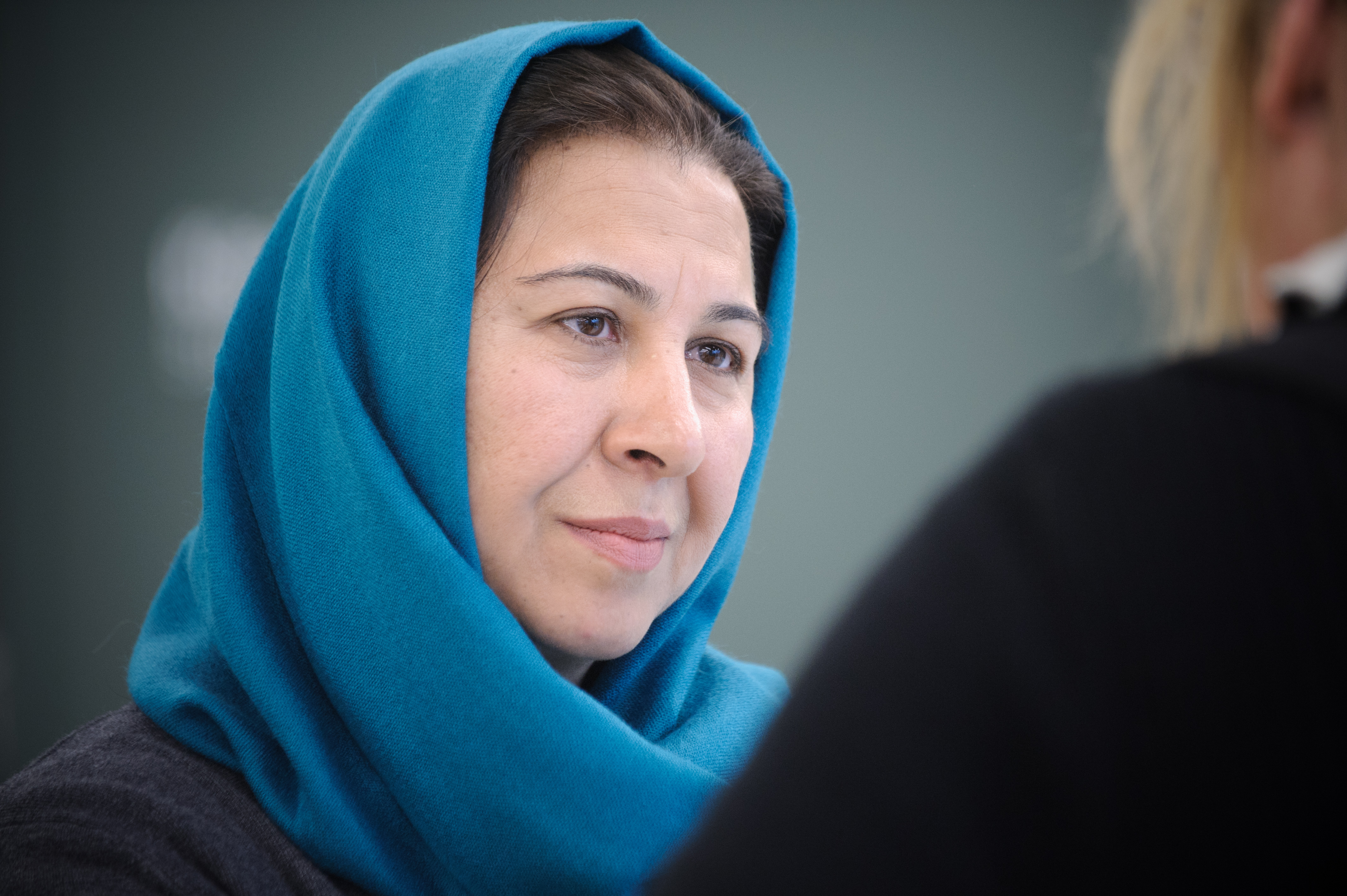
- Karokhail in 2011
- In office 2016–2018
- President: Ashraf Ghani
- Preceded by: Shaam Lal Patija
- Succeeded by: Hassan Soroosh

Personal details
- Born: Kabul, Afghanistan
- Education: Kabul Medical University; National Institute of Modern Languages of Islamabad

Shinkai Zahine Karokhail (Pashto: شينکۍ ذهين کړوخېل) is an Afghan politician and rights activist, focusing mainly on the political representation of women and the protection of vulnerably children. She was the Afghan ambassador to Canada and served in the Afghan Parliament for 15 years.

== Early life ==
Karokhail was born to Pashtun parents in Kabul, Afghanistan, where she attended the Medical College of the Kabul University and graduated with a medical degree. Similarly, apart from medicine studying political science, she holds a diploma in English from the National Institute of Modern Languages of Islamabad, Pakistan. She speaks Persian, Pashto, Urdu and English.

== Political career ==
Karokhail was elected Wolesi Jirga as an MP in 2005 to represent the people of Kabul in the National Assembly of the Islamic Republic of Afghanistan. She was re-elected in the 2010 parliamentary elections. She was a member and founder the Parliamentary Women Caucus committee and served on the Budget and Finance Committee. Their efforts led to a National Action Plan for the Women of Afghanistan by the government.

Karokhail has a vocal advocate of women's rights, working tirelessly on conflict prevention programmes.

In 1991, she among others members founded the Afghan Women's Educational Center, initially taking up teaching responsibilities followed by various other posts during the later years. In 2002, she became the director of the NGO heading its developmental and management programmes. She was also a member of the Afghan women's network.

She launched a national campaign called "Let's Fight Against Cancer" in collaboration with other notable officials and medical professionals, and her efforts with others led to the establishment of the Afghanistan Cancer Foundation and the creation of an oncology ward at Jamhooriat Public Hospital in Kabul in October 2016.

Karokhail played a pivotal role in opposing the controversial draft Shia Family Law, which was seen to be oppressing Shiite women and depriving them of many of their rights in a marital relationship. After making international headlines, a number of amendments were made to the draft law in order to make it more acceptable.

Moreover, she was also one of the few voices behind the Elimination of Violence Against Women Bill which was approved by the President of Afghanistan in 2009. She was the only parliamentarian alongside other female leaders from various departments to be invited to witness the signing of the bill by President Hamid Karzai.

In 2021, after the return of the Taliban, she fled to Canada, where her children reside. She currently lives in Mississauga.

== Interests ==
Karokhail focuses on development, medicine, economic security, good governance, justice and transparency, human rights, regional cooperation & security, women, peace and security issues as well as lobbying for more women in the inner circle of power.

== Awards ==
In 2012, Karokhail received the East West Institute's first ever H.H. Sheikha Fatima bint Mubarak Award for values-based Leadership.

In May 2014 she received the Malakai Kakar Human Rights Award from the Queens-based association Women for Afghan Women.In August of that year she received a humanitarian award from the Afghan American Women's Association in Virginia.

In December of 2015 she was given an anti-corruption award on anti-corruption day.

== Personal life ==
She has mentioned in an interview she has 4 children who live in Canada with her.
