= Abdul Hafiz Mansoor =

Afghan politician

Abdul Hafiz Mansoor (also spelled Mansur, born in 1963 in the Panjsher Valley) is an Afghan politician.

While Mansoor was a university student, the Soviet Union sent troops into Afghanistan, and Mansoor joined the Jamiat-e Islami, a mujahideen faction based in the Tajik region of Afghanistan. He became the editor of the Jamiat-e Islami's newspaper, Voice of the Holy Warriors.

He became the head of Afghanistan's news agency when the Jamiat-led mujahideen captured Kabul in 1992.

After the fall of the Taliban in 2001, Mansoor served as the first director of state radio and television in Afghanistan. As director, he was criticized for some of his conservative decisions, which included a ban on showing female singers on TV. He was a member of the 2002 and 2003 loya jirgas and in 2003 ran for the loya jirga's chairmanship, but lost to Sibghatullah Mojaddedi.

Mansoor also ran for president in the election of October 2004, but only received 0.2% of the vote. Mansoor had been highly critical of President Karzai, and has accused him of trying to form a dictatorship.
