= National Unity Party of the Tribes of Afghanistan =

National Unity Party of the Tribes of Afghanistan is a political party in Afghanistan, led by Nasrullah Barakzai.
