= Muhammad Arif Rahmani =

Afghan politician

- محمدعارف رحمانی

Representative in Parliament of Afghanistan

Personal details
- Born: 1975 (age 50–51) Qarabagh District, Ghazni, Ghazni province
- Ethnicity: Hazara

Muhammad Arif Rahmani (Persian: محمدعارف رحمانی) is an ethnic Hazara politician from Afghanistan. He is the former representative of the people of Ghazni province in the 16th and 17th rounds of the Wolesi Jirga (Parliament of Afghanistan).

== Early life ==
Muhammad Arif Rahmani was born in 1975 in Qarabagh District, Ghazni, Ghazni province. In 2007 he received a bachelor's degree in Islamic Education and Law from the university of Markaz Jahan Ulom Islami.

== Personal life ==
Muhammad Arif Rahmani is married and has two children.
