= Islamic Rule Party of Afghanistan =

Afghanistan political party

Islamic Rule Party of Afghanistan (Hezb-e Iqtidar-e Islami-ye Afghanistan) is a political party in Afghanistan led by Ahmad Shah Ahmadzai. It was formed after a split from the Islamic Movement of Afghanistan just ahead of the 2005 elections. It was, however, denied registration.
