= Abdul Rauf Ibrahimi =

Uzbek legislator and politician from Afghanistan

Abdul Rauf Ibrahimi عبدالرؤوف ابراهیمی
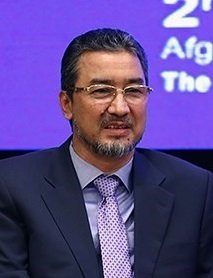
- Abdul Rauf Ibrahimi in 2018

Speaker of the House of the People
- In office 27 February 2011 – 20 May 2019
- Preceded by: Yunus Qanuni
- Succeeded by: Mir Rahman Rahmani

Personal details
- Born: 1962 (age 63–64) Imam Sahib, Kunduz Province, Afghanistan
- Occupation: Politician, legislator
- Known for: Speaker of the Wolesi Jirga
- Ethnicity: Uzbek

Abdul Rauf Ibrahimi is an Uzbek legislator and politician from Afghanistan.

== Biography ==
Abdul Rauf Ibrahimi was born in the Imam Sahib district of northern Kunduz Province in 1962, and is a member of the Ibrahims Clan. He finished his primary education at Basus Middle School in Imam Shabib District and later studied at a madrassa until 12th grade in Takharistan, Kunduz. After completing high school education in 1979, he was admitted to the Languages & Literature Faculty of Kabul University.

He joined the Hezb-e Islam mujahedeen group when the Soviet Union invaded Afghanistan. Following the mujahidin's victory, he was appointed as Shir Khan Dry Port director in 1993. Subsequently, he was appointed as commander of 3rd southern border police zone.

After the collapse of the Taliban regime, he worked as commander of border police in 2002 before being elected as Emergency Loya Jirga member the same year. Ibrahimi was elected as Wolesi Jirga (lower house) member from Kunduz in 2005. He won a parliamentary seat for the second time in 2010 when he was elected as speaker of the Wolesi Jirga. He earned his BA in the Arabic Department of the Literature Faculty at the Kabul University.
