= Sakhi (Meshrano Jirga representative) =

Afghan politician

- Occupation: Legislator

Haji Sakhi was selected to represent Kunar Province in Afghanistan's Meshrano Jirga, the upper house of its National Legislature, in 2005. A report on Kunar prepared at the Navy Postgraduate School stated that he was "affiliated with Sedaqat". It states he was a college graduate, who sat on the Economics Committee.
