= Sayed Ishaq Gailani =

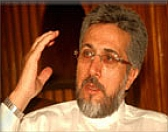
Sayed Ishaq Gailani

Sayed Ishaq Gailani (born 1954) is a politician in Afghanistan who has formerly represented Paktika province in the Wolesi Jirga, Afghanistan's lower house of parliament. He is the founder and chairman of the National Solidarity Movement of Afghanistan and served on the Wolesi Jirga's International Relations committee. While still an influential member of the Gailani family, he has claimed leadership of the family and adopted the title Pir. Some of his family recognizes his uncle, Ahmed Gailani, as the leader of the family and the Qadiriyya Sufi order. The resulting dispute has created a feud between the two men.

Ishaq Gailani was born in 1954 in the Shāre Naw section of Kabul. He attended Masod-e Sad School for his primary and secondary education and later went to Naderia High School.

During testimony at Kako Kandahari's Combatant Status Review Tribunal, Haji Ghalib testified that he had traveled to Persian Gulf during the Gulf War, under the leadership of Said Ghalani, to join the coalition opposing Iraq's invasion of Kuwait. He testified Ghalani was leading a group of Afghan mujahideen called the Mahazamili.
