= Ramazan Bashardost =

Afghan politician

Ramazan Bashardost رمضان بشردوست
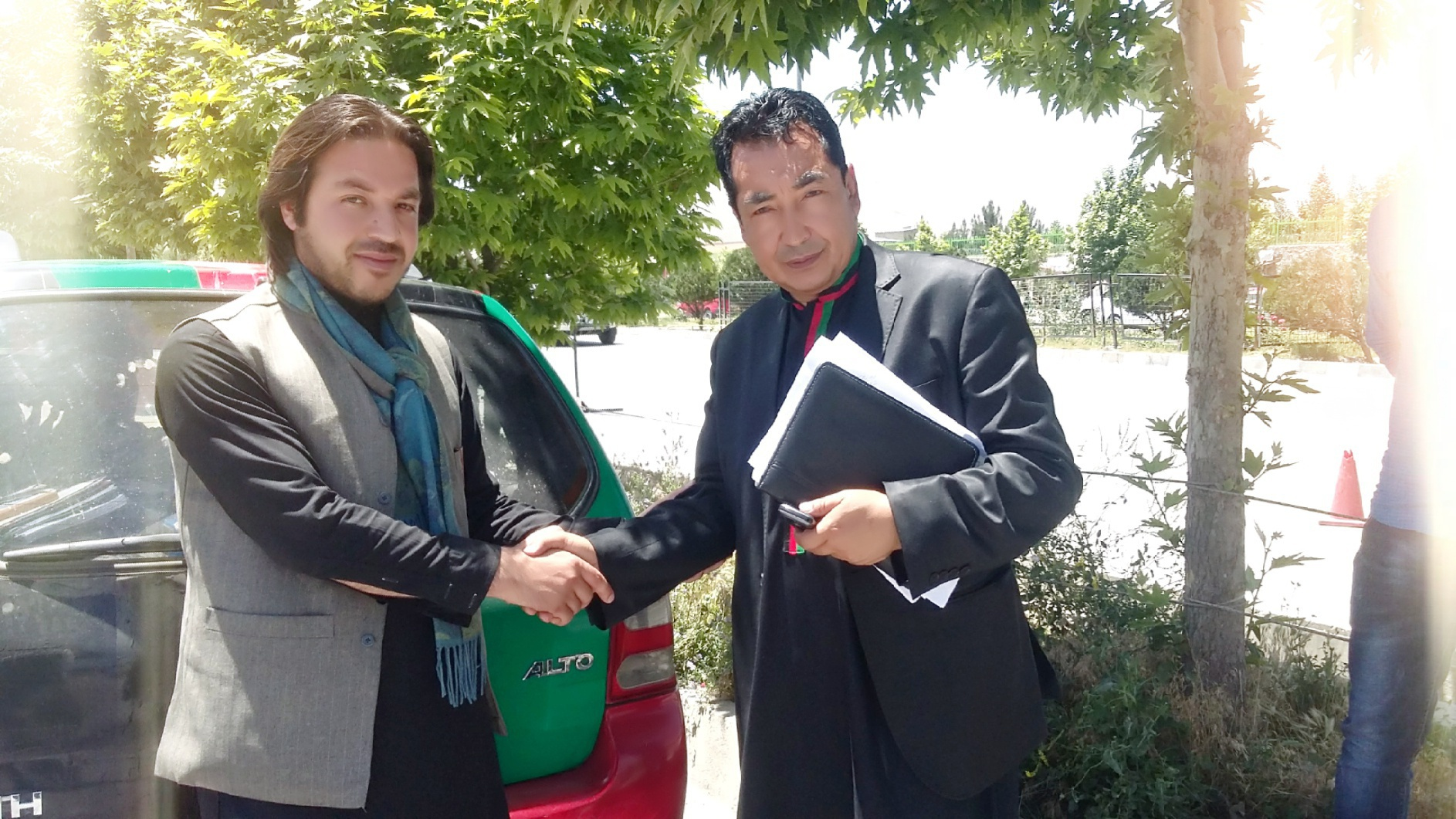
- Ramazan Bashardost (right)
- Born: Qarabagh, Ghazni Province, Afghanistan
- Occupations: Member of Parliament, Politician, Social activist, Owner of Charity Foundation
- Political party: Independent

Ramazan Bashardost (Dari: رمضان بشردوست; born 1961) is an Afghan politician who is a former planning minister of Afghanistan and a former member of the National Assembly of Afghanistan. He was an independent candidate in the 2009 Afghan presidential election.

== Early life and education ==
Ramzan Bashardost was born in Qarabagh District, Ghazni Province of Afghanistan to a Hazara family. He is fluent in Persian and Pashto. He completed his primary and intermediate education in Qarabagh and later in Maimana, capital of Fariyab in northern Afghanistan. Months after the 1978 coup d'état, Bashardost left Afghanistan for Iran. He finished high school in Iran and then immigrated into Pakistan.

In 1983, he left Pakistan for France, where he spent more than 20 years, earning degrees in law and political science. In 1989 he enrolled at Grenoble University, where he did his master's in law. In 1990, he did his master's in diplomacy from Paris University. In 1992, he did his master's in political science. In 1995, Bashardost received his Ph.D. in law from France's Toulouse Capitole University. He wrote his thesis on the UN's role against the Soviet invasion of Afghanistan.

== Career ==
After years in exile, Bashardost returned to Afghanistan in 2002 to work in the UN Department of Afghanistan's Foreign Affairs Ministry. In 2003, he was appointed as director of European and Western Political Affairs Department in the ministry. In March 2004, he was appointed minister of planning but resigned that December in protest at the government's alleged inability to take action over 2,000 Afghan and international non governmental organisations (NGOs) outlawed by his ministry in Afghanistan.

In 2004 Bashardost published his book, Basic Political, Military and Diplomatic Laws of Afghanistan – from the era of Ahmad Shah Baba (1225 Hejri) to current years, in which he presented his analysis of the history of laws in Afghanistan. The book won an award at the Academy of Political Sciences of France, the first award won by an independent Afghan scientist and scholar.

Bashardost has no affiliations with any tribal, military or political party. He is in an independent scholar and political activist, known for his support and defense of human rights. He has spoken out against the corrupt Afghan authorities of the past three decades.

In 2004/05 he briefly served as Afghanistan's planning minister. He was critical of the role played by NGOs and claimed that majority of them were a source of Afghanistan money drain. He particularly highlighted the hefty amounts paid to the NGO employees and ministers as compared to the average income of less than a dollar average national income. Controversy surrounded his stance, and he had to resign under government and foreign pressure. However, his outspoken criticism of the government and his firm stances against corruption and for public welfare won him widespread support.

In 2006 he was elected as Kabul's representative in the parliamentary elections. He won the third highest number of votes, which spanned across ethnic and linguistic groups.

In 2010 RFE/RL's Radio has selected him as the Person Of The Year and the Afghanistan' Gandhi.

== Presidential election 2009 ==
Bashardost registered for the presidential election on 7 May 2009. His first VP was agriculture institute professor Mohammad Mosa Barekzai, and the second VP was Afifa Maroof, who worked in the Afghan Independent Human Rights Commission. A white dove, the symbol of peace, was Bashardost's emblem for the election. Preliminary results placed him 3rd in a field of 38. In the provinces Ghazni and Daykundi he beat the two main candidates, Karzai and Abdullah.

Bashardost is mostly known for his strong rejection of corruption. "In the Afghan administration now, money is the law (...). Afghanistan is the only country in the world where corruption is legal". Because of his sometimes offbeat stance and style, he has been nicked as a"popular Don Quixote and a maverick.

== Literature ==
Basic Political, Military and Diplomatic Laws of Afghanistan, written and published in 2004.
