= Rangina Kargar =

Afghan politician (born 1985)

Rangina Kargar رنگینه کارگر
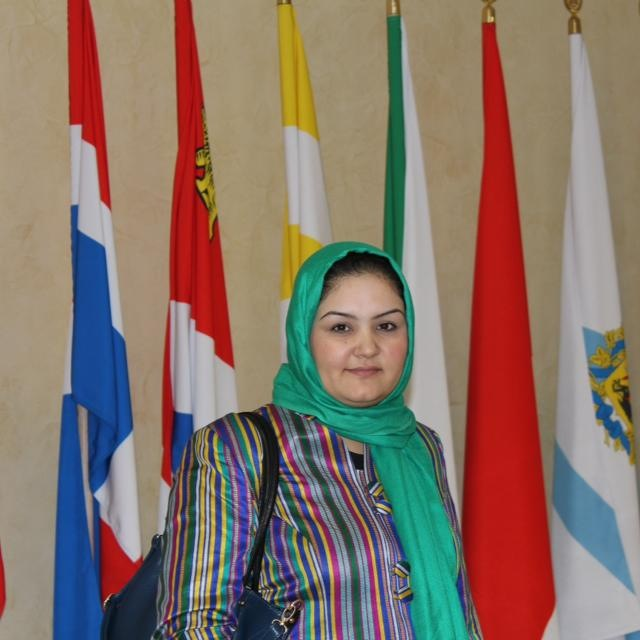
- Rangina Kargar on 2 January 2015

Member of the Afghan Parliament for Faryab Province
- Incumbent
- Assumed office 2010

Personal details
- Born: March 22, 1985 (age 41) Mazar-i-Sharif, Balkh Province, Afghanistan
- Occupation: Politician

Rangina Kargar (Dari: رنگینه کارگر, born March 22, 1985) is the member of Afghan Parliament (Wolesi Jirga). She is also Secretary of Parliamentary Committee on National Economy, NGOs, Rural Development, Agriculture and Animal Husbandry.

== Biography ==
Rangina Omar, the daughter of Said Omar, was born in Mazar i Sharif, in 1985. She lost her mother when she was only 5 years old and had to manage a big family by herself. In 2008, she married Fahim Kargar, the Chief of Staff of the National Security Council of Afghanistan. She has four children. She finished her primary education in Ayesha Afghan School and then she continued her studies in Sitara Lycee of Mazar-i-Sharif. After passing the Concor Exam, she attended Balkh University in 2003, and graduated with BA (Economics) in 2007.

== Social life ==
Kargar has worked as a finance officer and English teacher in one of the private schools in Mazar-i-Sharif. Kargar went to Andkhoy after her marriage, and resumed her social activities there. She established educational courses in remote areas of Faryab for women. Also, she promoted human rights and women's rights to the women of Faryab during her residence there. She has also worked in the Independent Election Commission. Recently, Kargar established the Afghanistan Monitoring and Evaluation National Association in association with Civil Society Members, Afghan Experts on M&E and faculty lecturers.

== Political life ==
Kargar was a candidate for the Membership of Afghan Parliament (Wolesi Jirga) in 2010. During the electoral campaigns, she was threatened not to participate in the elections but she didn’t give up and continued her campaigns. In Dawlatabad district her car faced a road-side bomb blast but she survived. Despite many challenges, Kargar won the parliamentary elections in Faryab.

Kargar is a Member of Parliament (Wolesi Jirga), but not a member of any political party. She believes in democracy, political pluralism, human rights and women's rights, and has also focussed on bilateral relations between Pakistan and Afghanistan
