= Zalmai Mujadidi =

Alhaj Abdul-Azeem Zulmay Mujadidi (Pashto: الحاج زلمی مجددی, born 1958) is a member of the Afghan Lower House of Parliament from the Badakhshan Province and one of President Hamid Karzai's most loyal followers in the northeast of Afghanistan.

== Mujahideen ==
Mujadidi, an ethnic Tajik, was born in 1958 in the Jurm District in Badakhshan Province in Afghanistan. During the years of fighting against the Soviet occupation of Afghanistan and the Taliban regime Mujadidi was a leading commander for the Jamiat Islami in Badakhshan. During the mid-90s however, Mujadidi got involved in the "commander wars," internal conflict within the Northern Alliance. After a conflict with the President of the Northern alliance, Burhanuddin Rabbani, Mujadidi was expelled from Badakhshan.

== Karzai's Man in Badakhshan ==
After major events in the War in Afghanistan including the toppling of the Taliban government Mujadidi came to be in charge of the security of the new Afghan President Hamid Karzai and the two became close allies. With support of Karzai, Mujadidi ran in the first Parliamentary elections since the Taliban regime for a seat in the Badakhshan Province, mostly as an opposition candidate to Rabbani who also ran in the same province. He got easily elected with 14145 votes, although that was barely half of the number of votes that Rabbani won.

== Member of Parliament ==
As a member of the Wolesi Jirga Mujadidi showed himself one of the firmest supporters of President Karzai and a conservative Islamist. He has not only a seat in Parliament, but is also in his province of Badakhshan a powerful and rich man. To consolidate his power in the province he reportedly intervened in the appointments of district administrators and police chiefs. His cousin is the police chief of Jurm District. He has also reportedly taken control of a lapis lazuli mine in Kuran Wa Munjan District. There are rumors of Mujadidi and his family's involvement in the narcotics trade through Badakhshan. Mujadidi's nephew, Colonel Jaweed, a former commander in the highway police in Badakhshan was arrested with 26 kg of heroin; while president Karzai reportedly showed himself willing to pardon Jaweed.[1]

== Re-election ==
The support between Mujadidi and Karzai works both ways. Mujadidi is said to be influential in appointments of position due to his good relations with Karzai, but in the second presidential election in 2009, Mujadidi was the director of the election campaign of Karzai in the northeastern region. In the Parliamentary Election of 2010 Mujadidi easily prolonged his term, winning more votes than any other candidate in the Badakhshan province.

== Political views ==
Mujadidi has showed himself an hardliner in policy against the west and Israel, stating in 2011 that: "There shouldn't be any strategic deal taking place between Afghanistan and the US, until the US and the Britain stop their support to Israel." According to a report on Ariana TV on the attendance of house meetings, they claimed that in a month Mujadidi skipped 8 of the 10 meetings of Parliament.

== Electoral history ==
Election	Province	Number of Votes	Percentage	Elected
2005 Afghan parliamentary election	Badakhshan	14,145	6.1%	Yes 2/9
2010 Afghan parliamentary election	Badakhshan	16,410	7.1%	Yes 1/9
2018 Afghan parliamentary election	Badakhshan	5,589	3.5%	Yes 7/9
