= Muhammad Naiem Lalay Hamidzai =

Afghan politician

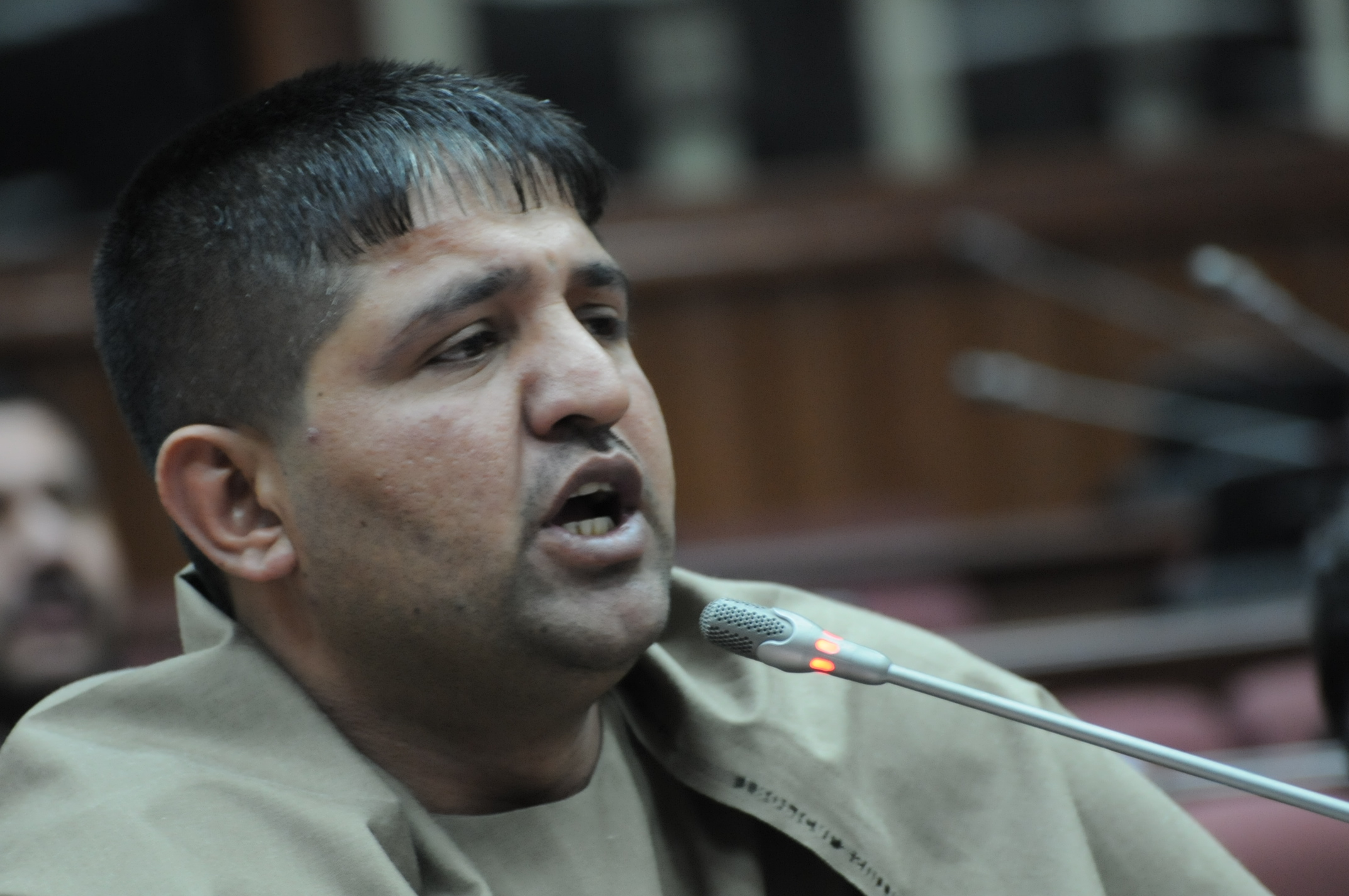

Representative in Parliament of Afghanistan

Personal details
- Born: 1977 (age 48–49) Spin Boldak District, Kandahar Province

Muhammad Naiem Lalay Hamidzai is an Afghan politician and the former member of the Wolesi Jirga (Parliament of Afghanistan).

== Early life ==
Muhammad Naiem Lalay Hamidzai, son of Anar Gul, was born 1977 in Spin Boldak District, Kandahar Province. Hamidzai graduated from Ghazi Abdullah Khan High School in Kandahar in 1994. In 2010, he was elected to parliament on behalf of Kandahar Province in the Wolesi Jirga.

== Previous Functions ==
- Gol Agha Shirzaei Security Director (2003-2008)
- Afghan Border Police Commander, Spin Boldak, Rapid Reaction Force (2008-2009)
- Afghan Anti-Narcotics Police (CNPA) Kandahar (2009-2010)
- Wolesi Jirga Member of Parliament 2010 MNA Kandahar

== Personal life ==
Hamidzai is married and has four children.
