= Mirwais Yasini =

Afghan politician (born 1962)

Mirwais Yasini میرویس یاسینی

Deputy speaker of the House of the People
- In office 2013–2021

Member of the House of the People for Nangarhar
- In office 2005–2021

Personal details
- Born: 1962 (age 63–64) Kama, Afghanistan
- Education: International Islamic University, Islamabad
- Occupation: Politician

Mirwais Yasini میرویس یاسینی (born 1962) is the current First Deputy Speaker of the Lower House of the Afghan Parliament. Following the Communist coup in 1978, Mirwais Yasini worked actively to combat the Soviet invasion, and went on to oppose the Taliban from 1993 to 2001 as a social and political activist. After the fall of the Taliban regime in 2002, Yasini began his political career as the Director of Foreign Relations and Economic Evaluation for Afghanistan's Ministry of Finance, and as a prominent member of the Emergency Loya Jirga, which met in Kabul. Since that time he has held several high-level political posts, including such titles as the First Deputy Speaker of the Constitutional Loya Jirga and Director General of the Counter Narcotics Department.

== Early life ==
Mirwais Yasini was born in 1962, in Kama district, Nangarhar province, Afghanistan. His father, Abdul Sattar Yasini, was a respected Islamic academic and attorney. He attended primary and high school in Nangarhar, and became fluent in Pashto, Dari, Arabic, English and Urdu.

== Involvement in the Soviet–Afghan War ==
After the Communist coup in 1978, Yasini and his family were among the most trusted influential politicians working in Afghanistan by that time, his uncle Shakoor Yasini was a very influential person against the soviet occupation. At that time Mirwais Yasini was a schoolboy and his uncle Shakoor Yasini was a religious scholar, but his uncle took hardly part in the battles during jihad, his famous practice is well known among locals, as he mastered the war and fought the Russian army as they reached the Mashreqi battlefield. His family is well known in Nangarhar Province.

== Opposition to the Taliban ==
For a period of 8 years (1993–2001), Yasini worked in active opposition to the Taliban regime as a social and political activist. As a prominent member of the anti-Taliban movement Yasini built his most enduring political relationships.

== The post-Taliban years ==
After the fall of the Taliban in 2002, Yasini was appointed as the first Director of the Red Cross in Nangarhar. Following this, Yasini was the Director of Foreign Relations and Economic Evaluation for the Ministry of Finance. Also in 2002, he was elected a member of the Emergency Loya Jirga, which met in Kabul.

In 2003, Yasini was appointed Director General of the Counter Narcotics Department of the National Security Council of Afghanistan. He was also an elected member of the Constitutional Loya Jirga and was elected as the first deputy speaker with the majority of votes. In 2005, Yasini was appointed Deputy Minister, Ministry of Counter Narcotics in the Government of Afghanistan.

== Parliamentary work ==
In 2005, Yasini was elected to the Lower House of the Afghan Parliament as a representative of Nangarhar Province. He is currently the leader of the largest parliamentary party in the Afghanistan lower house, the Afghanistan Parliamentary Party, and the First Deputy Speaker of the Lower House of the Afghan Parliament.

== Presidential bid ==
In March 2009, Mirwais Yasini announced his formal opposition to the Karzai government, and declared his intent to run in Afghanistan's 2009 Presidential Elections, citing flagging public support for the Karzai presidency due to rampant corruption.
