= Zakim Shah (Afghan election official) =

Afghan election official

Zakim Shah was the chairman or director of Afghanistan's Joint Election Management Board for the Afghan Presidential elections in 2004, and for the elections to the two houses of Afghanistan's National Legislature, the Wolesi Jirga, and Meshrano Jirga, in 2005. His duties including verifying that candidate qualified to stand for election. His duties also included officially announcing the winners.
