= Kabul University of Medical Sciences =

University in Kabul, Afghanistan

Coordinates: 34°31′0″N 69°7′47″E

- د کابل طبي پوهنتون / دانشگاه طبي کابل
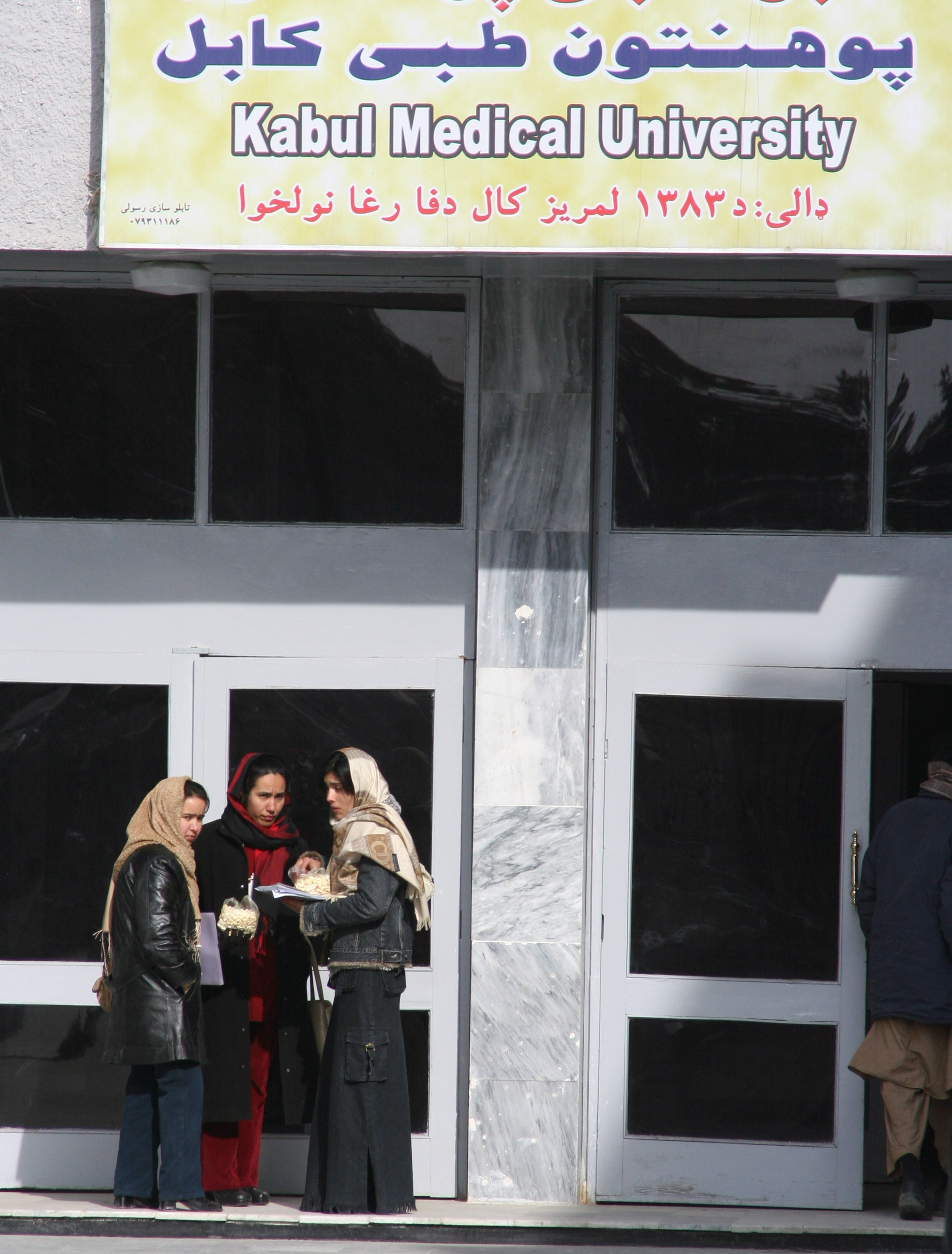
- Established: 1311 H (1932) faculty of medicine and in 1388 H (2008) Kabul Medical University = Medical school
- Chancellor: Sheikh-ul-Hadith Ehsanullah Abul-Faizan
- President: Sheikh-ul-Hadith Ehsanullah Abul-Faizan
- Students: 2,970
- Location: Kabul, Afghanistan
- Website: kums.edu.af/en

The Kabul University of Medical Sciences (KUMS), formerly named Kabul Medical University (KMU) , (Note: Pashto: د کابل طبي پوهنتون Dari: دانشگاه طبي کابل) is a public university in the Karte Sakhi neighborhood of Kabul, Afghanistan. It is within the campus grounds of Kabul University, near the French Medical Institute for Mothers and Children.

KUMS was established in 1932, when King Nadir Khan ruled the country. Like other universities, KUMS is under the Ministry of Higher Education. It has been a subordinate institute to Kabul University but developed into a single autonomous university in 2005. It currently graduates professionals in the fields of Curative Medicine, Pediatrics, Stomatology, Dentistry, and Nursing. In 2012, two new departments of Medical Technology and Anesthesia were also added. All subjects are taught in Pashto and Dari but most medical terms are in English. KUMS is one of Afghanistan's most highest-ranking universities.

== History ==
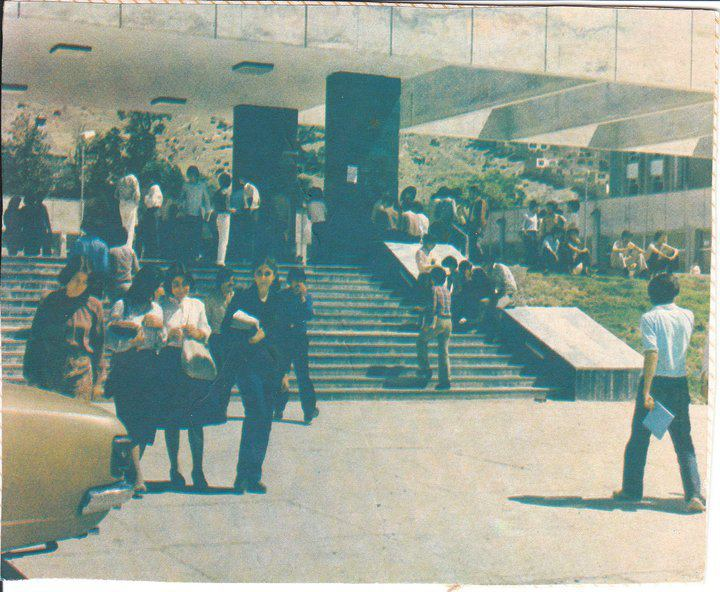
Entrance of the Faculty of Medicine, 1970s

Up until the beginning of the 1980s, Afghan Medical Schools across the country were under the tutelage and direction of the larger and more prestigious Kabul University. They all fell under the jurisdiction of the Ministry of Education; however, during the Soviet-Afghan war, all medical schools came under the control of the Ministry of Public Health. It would later fall again under the control of the Ministry of Higher Education after the conclusion of the war.

== 1996-2001 ==
During the Islamic Emirate of Afghanistan (1996–2001), women were not allowed to study medicine at the university.

== 2001-2021 ==
The University of Manitoba's medical school along with University of Nebraska Medical Center helped KUMS rebuild its library after the war. The University of Nebraska Medical Center provided KUMS with scholarships for lectures and students as well as provided it with up-to-date medical technology and research based institutions like Cardiac Research Center. Manitoba put together a basic collection of 672 medical textbooks.

In May 2006, and since the fall of the Taliban, a new group of Afghan women celebrated their achievement. Out of 460 students graduating from KUMS, 90 of them were women. They joined the ranks of prior Afghan female graduates who completed their education before establishment of Taliban rule. This new group of female graduates studied for dentistry and pediatrics.

In 2007 KUMS cooperated with the King Edward Medical University of Lahore Pakistan in training students.

== See also ==
- List of universities in Afghanistan
