= National Solidarity Movement of Afghanistan =

National Solidarity Movement of Afghanistan نهضت همبستگی ملی افغانستان
- Leader: Sayed Ishaq Gailani
- Ideology: Monarchism

The party known as National Solidarity Movement of Afghanistan (Dari: نهضت همبستگی ملی افغانستان, Nahzat-e Hambastagi-ye Melli-ye Afghanistan) was led by Sayed Ishaq Gailani. It supported Hamid Karzai in the 2004 presidential election despite its previous support for the former King Zahir Shah. It is connected with powerful conservative families in the Pashtun region.

The NSMA is member of the International Monarchist Conference.

National Solidarity Movement of Afghanistan (NSMA) is a political, social, organized and respected movement, which supports democracy, tribal councils and the establishment of cultural centers. The movement struggles to contribute in the elimination of the crisis, safeguarding independence and territorial integrity, ensuring national unity and social justice and the development and progress of the country towards prosperity.

The National Solidarity Movement plays an active role in the society as an independent organization. Compliance with the International principals, respect to national culture and traditions and observance of human rights, UN and other international conventions are among the objectives of the movement.
