= Muhammad Ali Akhlaqi =

Afghan politician

Afghanistan Parliament

Personal details
- Born: 1971 (age 54–55) Malistan, Ghazni, Afghanistan
- Occupation: Politician

Muhammad Ali Akhlaqi (Dari: محمدعلی اخلاقی) is an Afghan politician who was the representative of the people of Ghazni province in the 16th term of Afghan Parliament.

== Early life ==
Muhammad Ali Akhlaqi was born in 1971 in Malistan district of Ghazni province. In 2002, he graduated from Imam Khomeini University in Iran with a master's degree in sociology.

== See also ==
- List of Hazara people
