= Abdul Satar Sirat =

- عبدالستار سيرت
- Born: 15 October 1937 (age 88); Samangan, Kingdom of Afghanistan
- Education: Madrasa-i Abu Hanifa; Kabul University; Pacific Western University
- Title: Doctor

Abdul Satar Sirat (/ˈɑːbdəl səˈtɑːr ˈsiːrɑːt/ AHB-dəl sə-TAR SEE-raht, Persian: عبدالستار سيرت; born October 15, 1937) is an Islamic Scholar and former Afghan Justice Minister, as well as Deputy Prime Minister.

== Education ==
- Religious education from Madrasa-i Abu Hanifa
- Bachelor's degree in Islamic Studies from Kabul University
- Two master's degrees: in Islamic Sharia law and theology from Egypt, and in International Law
- Studied for one year at Al-Azhar University
- Completed under-graduate courses in Law at Columbia University, New York
- PhD in Islamic Studies from Pacific Western University, California

== Work life ==
Satar Sirat served as the Dean of Faculty of Islamic Studies at Kabul University from 1965 to 1967. In 1969, he was appointed as the Minister of Justice of Afghanistan until King Zahir Shah was deposed in 1973. In 1990, he was sent by Shah to Saudi Arabia and Islamabad, Pakistan for discussions on how to end the Afghan conflict. In 2000, Sirat lived in Jedda, Saudi Arabia and taught Islamic Studies at the King Abdulaziz University.

== Later life ==
Abdul Satar Sirat returned to Afghanistan in 2001. Sirat was a representative of the Rome group at the Bonn talks, where Sirat was elected as head of the interim government with 80% of the delegate vote. However, there were ethnicity-based concerns by the US government and particularly President Bush's Special Presidential Envoy Khalilzad, that Sirat was not a Pashtun, and Sirat was told to step aside for Hamid Karzai.

In later peace talks between the Taliban and the US government, the Taliban asked for the establishment of a neutral interim government, and specifically nominated Sirat as head of such an interim administration.
