= 2005 Afghan parliamentary election =

- 18 September 2005

All 249 seats in the House of the People
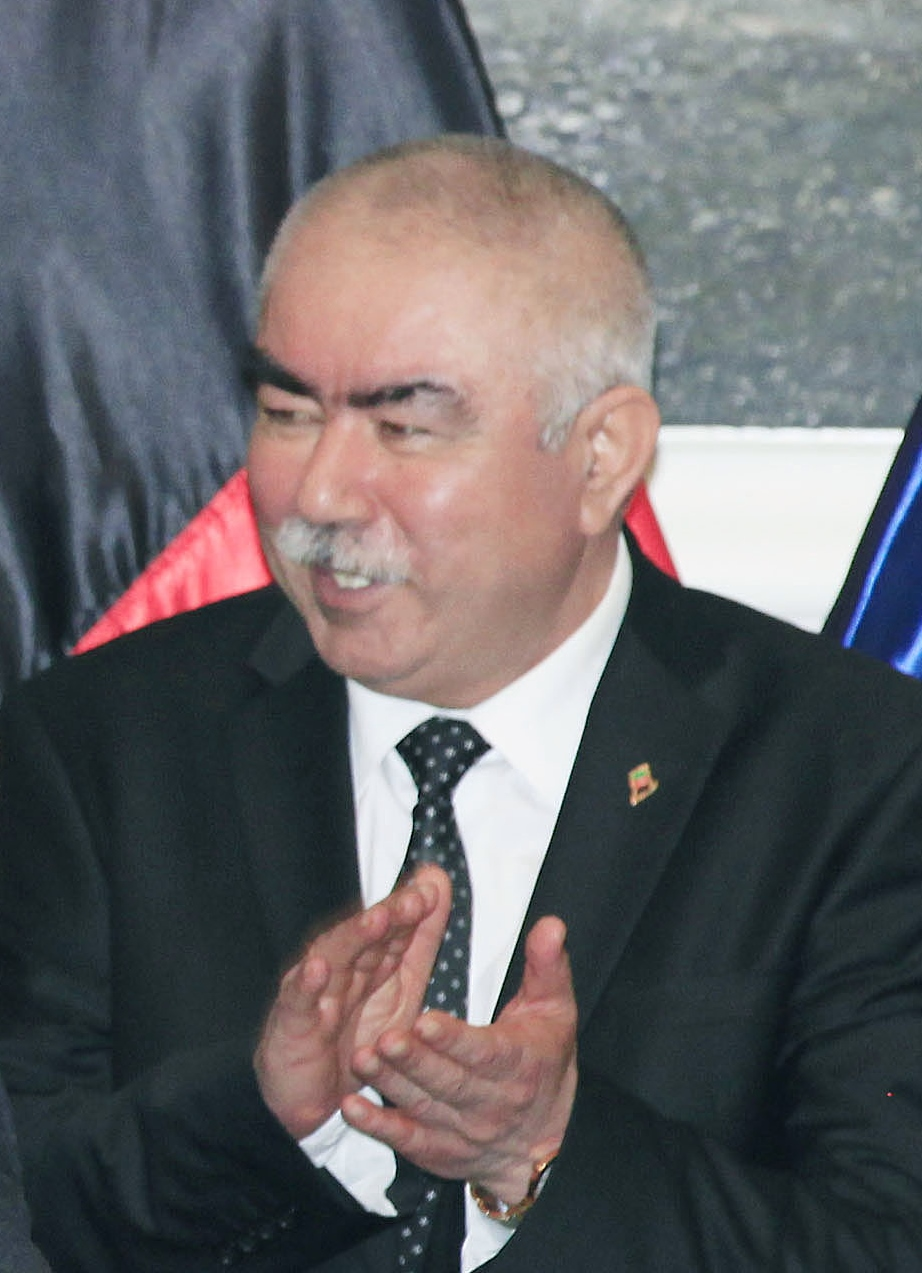

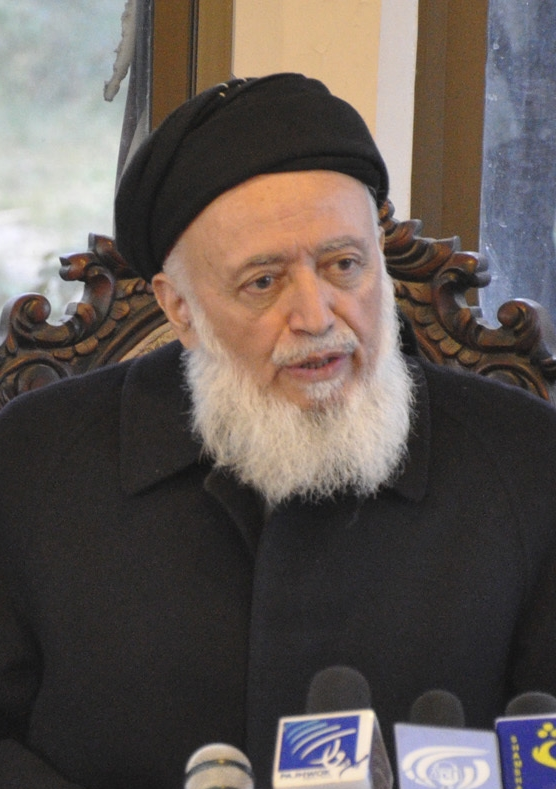

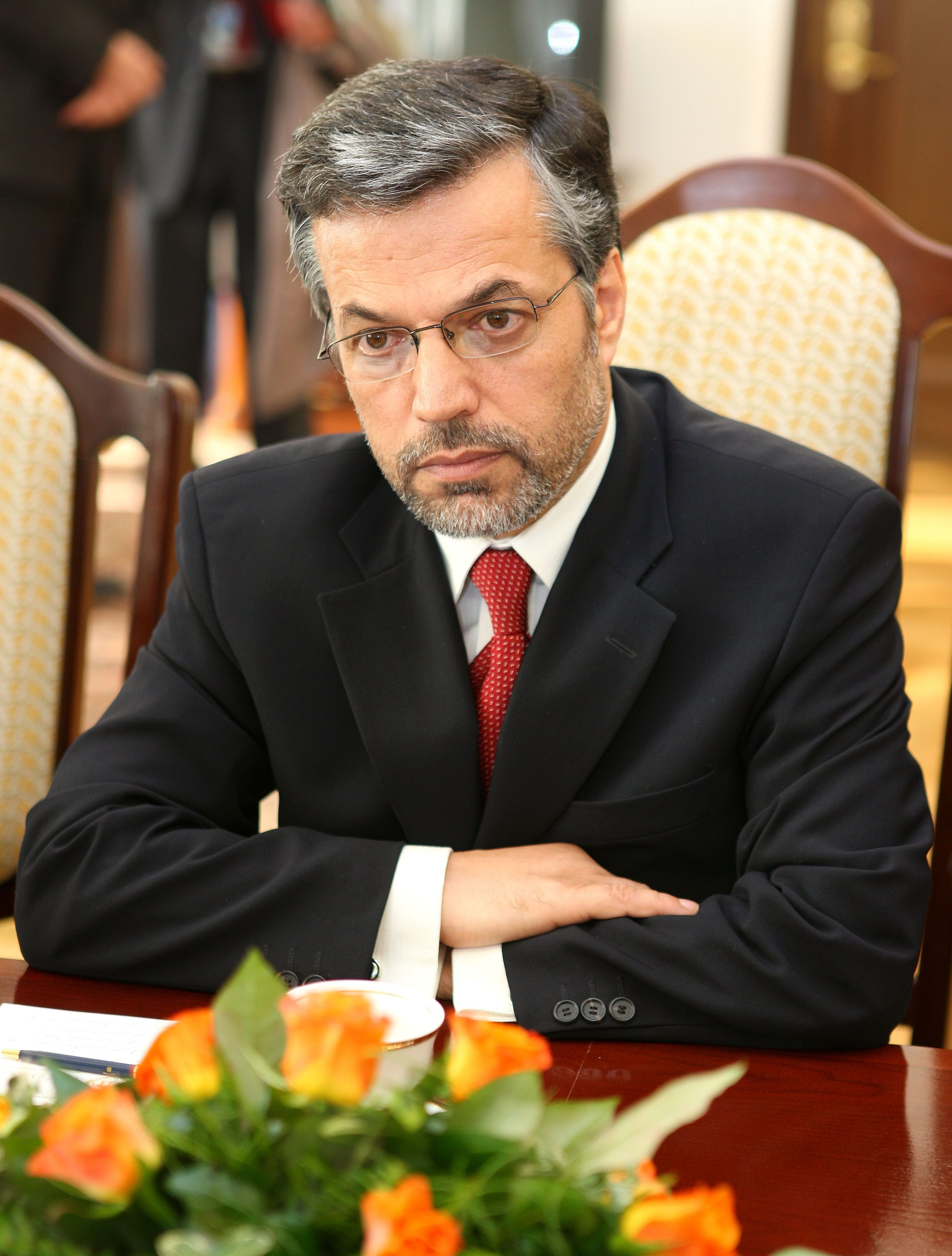
	First party	Second party	Third party
Leader	Abdul Rashid Dostum	Burhanuddin Rabbani	Yunus Qanuni
Party	Junbish	Jamiat-e Islami	Naveen
Seats won	33	22	13
Elected Speaker
Yunus Qanuni
Naveen

Parliamentary elections were held in Afghanistan alongside provincial elections on 18 September 2005. Former warlords and their followers gained the majority of seats in both the lower house and the provincial council (which elects the members of the upper house). Women won 28% of the seats in the lower house, six more than the 25% guaranteed in the 2004 constitution.

== Electoral system ==
Approximately twelve million voters were eligible to vote for the 249-seat Wolesi Jirga, the lower house of parliament, and 34 provincial councils. The 2,707 parliamentary candidates (328 female, 2,379 male) were all independent; parties were not recognized by law and lists did not exist. This has been the subject of criticism: relatively unknown people could win a seat as easily as very popular candidates. It has also made it considerably difficult for the population to decide whom to vote for, even though some candidates were members of or (financially) backed by a political party.

Another source of criticism was the use of the single, non-transferable vote in multi-member constituencies, particularly in the absence of party lists. In other words, each province elects a number of members, but each voter can vote for only one candidate, which risked fragmenting the vote to the point where candidates could be elected virtually by chance. Early returns confirmed this fear. For example, in Farah Province, one of the first provinces to declare its results, 46 candidates competed for five seats. No candidate polled more than 11%, and four of the five elected candidates polled less than 8%. In Kabul, which had 33 seats available, most of the candidates elected received well under 1%, while over 30% of the votes cast went to three candidates; the leading candidate received over 25 times the vote of the candidate elected with the lowest vote share, and several elected candidates received less than 2000 votes. This resulted in a legislature in which the majority of members had little legitimacy.

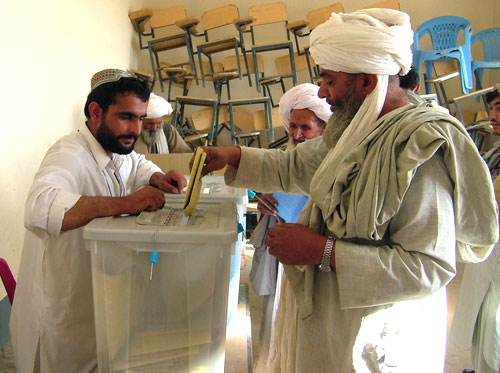
An Afghan man casting his ballot at a polling station at Lashkar Gah, which is the capital of Helmand province.

Because a significant percentage of the Afghan population was illiterate, all candidates had an icon as well. Those icons were included on the lists. These included, but were not limited to, pictures of footballs, cars or different sorts of flowers. Because there were not enough different icons, some candidates had multiple icons as their symbol, such as the multiple footballs of Gulallay Habib (page 16 of the Kabul parliament candidate list). Candidates were not able to choose the icons themselves: instead, the electoral committee chose them.

Forty-five candidates were refused because of connections with armed groups or for not giving up their government jobs.

People voted for a candidate in their own province. Each province had a number of representatives in parliament, depending on the population. The largest province by population, Kabul, had 33 seats (and 390 candidates, of which 50 were female), whereas the least populous ones like Nuristan, Nimruz and Panjshir, had only two.

The total number of candidates for the provincial councils was 3,025. Each province, except Oruzgan, had women running for seats in the provincial council. Female candidates ran for parliament in all districts. District council elections, originally also scheduled for the same date, were not held in 2005 (because district numbers, boundaries, and population figures had to be determined first).

These were the first parliamentary elections in Afghanistan in 33 years: after communist rule, civil war and Taliban rule, the U.S. invasion of Afghanistan toppled the Taliban regime and after the presidential elections in 2004, parliamentary elections were organized for 2005. Originally, according to the 2001 Bonn agreement, the elections were to be held in June 2004. However, due to the security situation, Hamid Karzai (then interim President, now President of Afghanistan) moved the elections more than a year to the later date. Security was still an issue, as Taliban and others threatened to disrupt the elections violently. Several candidates were killed before the election.

A quarter of the seats - 68 seats - in the parliament were reserved for women, as well as 10 seats for the Kuchi community. Those were minimum numbers, with no maximum number of seats for those groups. The 102 members of the Meshrano Jirga, the upper house, are indirectly elected by the provincial councils.

== Conduct ==
During the 2009 Afghan elections, former U.S. Ambassador to Afghanistan Ronald E. Neumann recalled that the "indelible" ink used in the 2005 election to prevent people from voting more than once had turned out to be washable after all. The same problem had also occurred in the 2004 presidential elections, and was repeated again in the 2009 elections.

For this and other reasons, there were widespread irregularities, with some observers concluding that fraudulent votes outnumbered genuine ones.

== Results ==
Turnout was estimated at 50%, substantially lower than the presidential election in October 2004. This was blamed on the lack of identifiable party lists due to Afghanistan's new electoral law, which left many voters unclear about the identities of many candidates. Official turnout was highest in the Turkmen, Uzbek and the Tajik-populated provinces in the north: generally over 60%; and 50% in some of the Pashtun southeastern areas where the Taliban insurgency was strongest. Turnout was surprisingly low (34%) in the capital Kabul, which is dominated by Tajiks.

The first results were declared on 9 October, with final results being delayed by accusations of fraud and attempts to resolve these allegations, and were finally announced on 12 November. Only a minority of candidates contested the election on a party ticket, whilst a number of elected MPs were loosely associated with certain parties.

Party	General seats			Kuchi seats			Total seats
Party	Votes	%	Seats	Votes	%	Seats	Total seats
Independents	5,884,001	100.00	239	200,249	100.00	10	249
Total	5,884,001	100.00	239	200,249	100.00	10	249
Valid votes	5,884,001	94.78		200,249	97.77		
Invalid/blank votes	323,792	5.22		4,573	2.23		
Total votes	6,207,793	100.00		204,822	100.00		
Registered voters/turnout	12,443,231	49.89					
Source: JEMB, Psephos

=== Votes by province ===
Province	Votes	Invalid/blank	Turnout	Registered
Badakhshan	232,095	11,645	243,740	400,918
Badghis	130,669	6,112	136,781	234,680
Baghlan	196,892	12,273	209,165	386,713
Balkh	291,804	15,311	307,115	600,893
Bamyan	121,879	4,417	126,296	176,008
Daikundi	144,982	11,648	156,630	253,589
Farah	106,583	4,245	110,828	192,614
Faryab	238,427	18,370	256,797	410,716
Ghazni	370,255	8,322	378,577	745,225
Ghor	206,683	6,610	213,293	320,374
Helmand	170,236	23,926	194,162	528,124
Herat	474,541	43,385	517,926	824,722
Jowzjan	126,951	11,134	138,085	218,548
Kabul	380,774	19,036	399,810	1,193,472
Kandahar	171,470	17,157	188,627	744,952
Kapisa	81,995	1,971	83,966	202,800
Khost	185,142	3,331	188,473	336,125
Kunar	122,017	4,265	126,282	274,583
Kunduz	230,215	16,543	246,758	402,195
Laghman	83,873	3,611	87,484	230,948
Logar	73,638	2,632	76,270	197,380
Nangarhar	366,599	16,571	383,170	804,515
Nimroz	34,945	2,805	37,750	85,562
Nuristan	79,451	414	79,865	124,583
Paktia	247,424	4,065	251,489	394,504
Paktika	262,987	1,871	264,858	500,719
Panjsher	47,979	1,239	49,218	139,397
Parwan	82,665	4,852	87,517	245,385
Samangan	104,060	5,895	109,955	165,218
Sar-I-Pul	113,588	7,351	120,939	192,294
Takhar	251,045	28,201	279,246	418,696
Uruzgan	34,283	1,080	35,363	150,865
Wardak	98,508	2,155	100,663	243,219
Zabul	19,346	1,349	20,695	102,695
Total	5,884,001	323,792	6,207,793	12,443,231

=== Estimated parties ===
Party	Seats
National Islamic Movement	33
Jamiat-e Islami	22
New Afghanistan Party	13
Hezbe Eqtedar Milli	12
Hezbi Islami	12
Islamic Dawah Organisation	9
People's Islamic Unity Party of Afghanistan	9
National United Party	8
Afghan Mellat Party	8
Hezbe Wahdat	3
National Islamic Front	3
Islamic Movement	3
National Solidarity Movement	3
National Solidarity Party	1
Republican Party	0
Independents	110
Total	249
Source: National Democratic Institute

=== Elected members ===
(This list is incomplete)

Name	Role	Constituency	Notes
Mohammad Younis Qanooni	Speaker	Kabul Province	Member of Afghan cabinet during the Afghan Interim Administration and Afghan Transitional Administration.
Mirwais Yasini	First Deputy Speaker	Nangarhar Province	Candidate for President in 2009.
Mohammad Arif Noorzai	First deputy speaker	Kandahar Province	Deputy speaker, related to President Hamid Karzai through marriage.
Burhanuddin Rabbani		Badakshan Province	Former President of Afghanistan, leader of Islamic Society of Afghanistan
Pacha Khan Zadran		Paktia Province	Signatory to Bonn Conference, under suspicion of warlordism.
Saleh Mohammad Registani		Panjshir Province	Prominent anti-Taliban figure, who fought against the Taliban and Al-Qaeda during the resistance period in Afghanistan.
Malalai Joya		Farah Province	Women's rights campaigner, nicknamed "the bravest woman in Afghanistan."
Sayed Mohmood Hasamuddeen Al-Gailani		Ghazni Province	Grandson of Pir Gailani, a prominent Sufi, and leader of an Afghan political party.
Ali Akbar Qasimi		Ghazni Province	General in the Afghan National Army, and was a former commander of the 14th Division, which was garrisoned in Ghazni.
Mohammad Daud Sultanzoy		Ghazni Province	Former pilot for United Airlines.
Niyaz Mohammad Amiri		Ghazni Province	Brother of Shah Mohammad and cousin of Hajji Fazell, Governors of two of Ghazni's districts.
Rahila Bibi Kobra Alamshahi		Ghazni Province	Teacher and journalist.
Zahera Ahmadyar Mawlayee		Ghazni Province	Formerly the head of the Ghazni women's shura. She was a university physics and math instructor at a
Shah Gul Rezai		Ghazni Province	Teacher from the Jaghoray district, prior to her election.
Abdul Qayyum Sajjadi		Ghazni Province	Editor of a science journal prior to taking office.
Khyal Mohammad Mohammad Khan		Ghazni Province	Financial chief for the Hezbi Islami, won by two votes.
Al-Haj Mamur Abdul Jabar Shulgari		Ghazni Province	Member of the Loya Jirga that drafted Afghanistan's new Constitution.
Abdul Bagi Baryal		Ghazni Province	Founded an organization for the disabled after he was blinded and lost a leg from a rocket during the Soviet occupation of Afghanistan.
Fauzia Gailani		Herat Province	Won more votes than any other female candidate, or any other candidate in Herat.
Fazlullah Mojadeddi		Logar Province	Formerly Governor of Logar. Member of Wolesi Jirga from 2005 to 2010. Did not run in the 2010 elections.
Dr. Shakila Hashimi		Logar Province	Chairperson of the Health Committee
Ali Mohammad		Logar Province	Sat on the Communications, Urban Development, Water, power, Municipal Affairs Committee
Wali Wahdatyar Ahmadzai		Logar Province	
Haji Akbar Stanekzai		Logar Province	
Hajji Alam Gull Kuchi		Kuchi people	
Shukria Barakzai		Kabul Province	Women's rights campaigner, journalist.
Malalai Shinwari		Kabul Province	Worked as a journalist prior to running for office, reported that her supporters were subjected to intimidation from traditionalists, opposes selling daughters into marriage to pay off debts.
Fauzia Nasryar Haidari		Kabul Province	
Fatima Nazry		Kabul Province	
Erfanullah Erfan		Kabul Province	
Alami Balkhi		Kabul Province	Reported to be "associated with [Yunus] Qanuni's political faction."
Anwar Khan Auriakhel		Kabul Province	
Baidar Zazai		Kabul Province	
Abbas Noyan		Kabul Province	
Jamil Karzai		Kabul Province	Second cousin to President Hamid Karzai, head of the National Youth Solidarity Party, sat on the Internal Security Committee.
Obaidullah		Kandahar Province	Served on the Economics committee.
Malali Ishaqzai		Kandahar Province	Served on the Government Services Committee.
Haji Ahmad Shah Khan Asakzai		Kandahar Province	Sat on the Armed Service Committee.
Haji Ameer Lali		Kandahar Province	Sat on the Armed Services Committee.
Fariba Ahmadi Kakar		Kandahar Province	Sat on the Armed Services Committee.
Habibullah Jan		Kandahar Province	Sat on the "Kandahar Security Shura", reported to have been a "sometimes rival of [President] Karzai"; assassinated in 2008, reportedly by the Taliban.
Khalid Pashtoon		Kandahar Province	Deputy chair of the Internal Security Committee.
Noorulhaq Olumi		Kandahar Province	Chair of the Armed Services Committee.
Shakiba Hashemi		Kandahar Province	Sat on the Environment Committee.
Sayyad Mohammad		Kandahar Province	Sat on the Armed Services Committee.
Amir Khan Sabri		Khost Province	Sat on the Communications Committee.
Mawlawi Hanif Shah al-Hussaini		Khost Province	Sat on the Justice Committee.
Sahira Sharif		Khost Province	Sat on the Education Committee.
Sayed Mohammad Gulabzoy		Khost Province	Sat on the Internal Security Committee.
Gul Haar Jalal		Kunar Province	Sat on the Disabled and Martyrs Committee.
Shujaul Mulik		Kunar Province	Sat on the Internal Security Committee.
Mawlawi Shahzada Shahid		Kunar Province	Sat on the Counter-narcotics committee.
Al-Haj Sahib Rahman		Kunar Province	Sat on the Economics Committee, assassinated by a suicide bomber on November 6, 2007.
Sayed Durahman		Laghman Province	Former madrassa teacher.
Engineer Mohammad Alim Qarar		Laghman Province	Former commander with the Hezb-e-Islami Gulbuddin militia.
Zefnoon Safai		Laghman Province	Sat on the legislature's budget committee.
Esmatullah Muhabat		Laghman Province	Killed in 2005.
Mulla Abdul Salam Rakity		Zabul Province	Former Taliban commander, sat on the Internal Security Committee.
Hameedullah Khan Tokhi		Zabul Province	Sat on the Internal Security Committee.
Toorpekai		Zabul Province	Sat on the Communications Committee.
Ahmad Waheed Khan Tahiri		Herat Province	
Abdul Hadi Jamshidi		Herat Province	
Abdul Salam Qazizada		Herat Province	
Ahmad Behzad		Herat Province	
Ahmad Waheed Khan Tahiri		Herat Province	
Aqayee Jebraili		Herat Province	
Aziz Ahmad Naadim		Herat Province	
Gul Ahmad		Herat Province	
Mohammad Arif Tayab		Herat Province	
Mohammad Salih Saljoqi		Herat Province	
Najla Dehqan Nizhad		Herat Province	
Qazi Nazir Ahmad		Herat Province	
Rahimi Jami		Herat Province	
Saadat Fatahi		Herat Province	
Sayyad Mohammad Shafiq		Herat Province	
Shahnaz Hemati		Herat Province	
Zarin		Herat Province	
Fatima Aziz		Kunduz Province	

== See also ==
- Enemies of Happiness, a documentary film shot during the election
