= Wardak =

Wardak may refer to:

== People ==
- Abdul Ahad Wardak, Afghan politician
- Abdul Rahim Wardak, Afghan politician
- Abdullah Wardak, Afghan politician
- Abdul Qayum Wardak, Afghan politician
- Ahmed Wardak, Afghan-born German cricketer
- Amin Wardak, Afghan mujahideen leader
- Ghulam Farooq Wardak, Afghan politician
- Ghulam Sediq Wardak, Afghan inventor
- Kazimierz Wardak, Polish runner
- Zakia Wardak, Afghan architect, politician, and businesswoman

== Other ==
- Wardak (Pashtun tribe)
- Wardak Province, Afghanistan
- Chak Wardak District, Afghanistan
- Tangi Valley AKA Wardak Valley or Tangi Wardak, in Wardak Province
