= Ghulam Hassan Gran =

Afghan politician (born 1958)

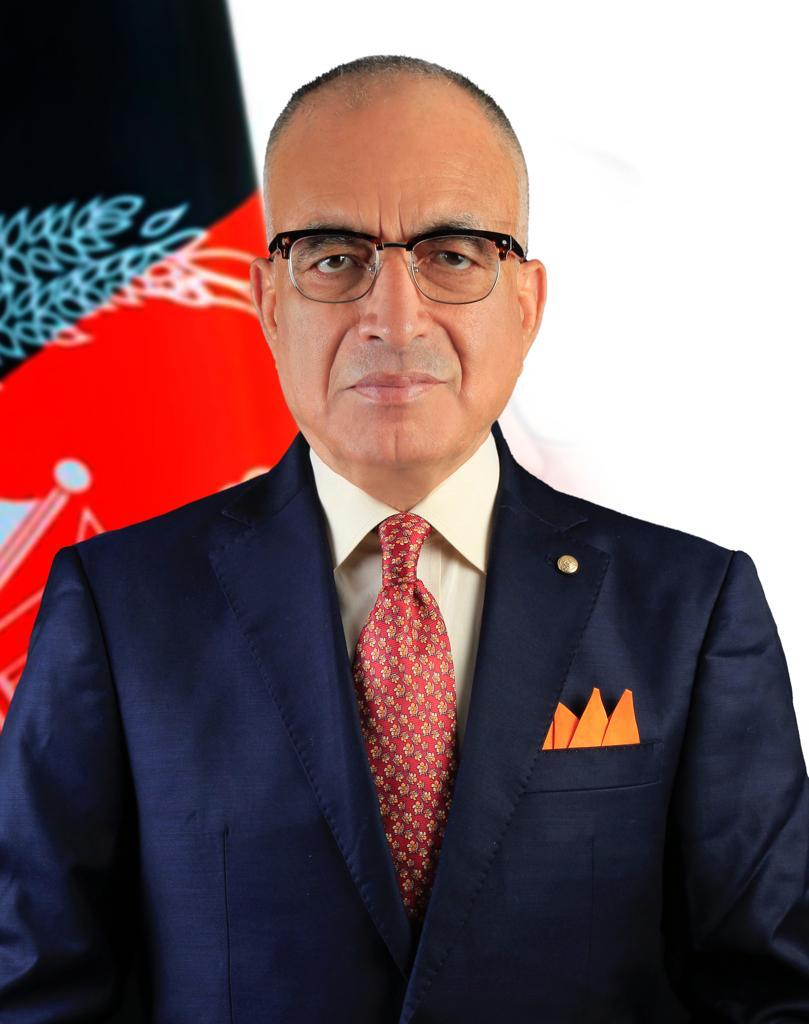

Director of Political, Cultural and Public Affairs of the President Office of the Islamic Republic of Afghanistan
- In office 1 July 2020 – August 2021
- President: Ashraf Ghani

Ministry of Interior Affairs
- In office 1 September 2015 – 25 July 2020
- Minister: Mohammad Masoud Andrabi
- Preceded by: Abdul Jamil Sediqi

Ministry of Education
- In office 1 January 2012 – 3 July 2013
- Minister: Ghulam Farooq Wardak

House of the People (Afghanistan)
- In office 1 January 2004 – 3 July 2011
- President: Hamid Karzai

ICRC
- In office 1 January 2001 – 3 July 2004

Personal details
- Born: 1958 (age 67–68) Farah, Afghanistan
- Spouse: Laila Gran
- Children: 3
- Education: Canyon College (USA)

Ghulam Hassan Gran is an Afghan government official, politician and lawyer serving as the Director of Political, Cultural and Public Affairs of the President Office of the Islamic Republic of Afghanistan since July 2020 until August 2021 then after the fall of the Republic regime by the Taliban he left his job.

He previously served as Senior Advisor to the Ministry of Interior Affairs for Policy and Strategic Affairs from 2016 to 2020 and from 2013 to 2015 as Senior Legal and Education Quality Advisor to the Ministry of Education (Afghanistan).

Gran served as Secretary General of Wolesi Jirga (House of the People (Afghanistan) National Assembly of Afghanistan at the ministerial level from 2004 to 2011. He is the drafter of Rule of Procedure and other parliamentary internal rules and procedures for both houses of the National Assembly of Afghanistan. During his tenure as Secretary General, he engaged in various efforts and activities in order to institutionalize the legislature in Afghanistan.

Before the Secretarial General and re-opening of Afghanistan parliament (the last parliament was closed in 1973 after a military coup d’état by President Mohammed Daoud Khan), he was the Director of Parliamentary and Legislative Affairs for one year before the re-opening of the Afghanistan Parliament. From 1978 to 1991, Gran worked in different administrative and legal posts in the Ministry of Interior Affairs. During 1994 to 1996, as a civil staff, he was the Chief of Staff of the Deputy Ministry of Interior Affairs. Following the occupation of Taliban, Gran left his job in the Ministry of Interior Affairs.

Gran participated in different regional and international conferences around Asia, Europe, Africa and America.

== Private sector ==
Gran was the Director of Afghan Blumberg Legal Consultancy from 2014 to 2015.

== International organization ==
He served as Senior Legal Advisor to the International Committee of the Red Cross (ICRC) from 1999 to 2013, as a Legal Advisor in the ICRC, in addition to various legal issues, he was also engaged in issues of Testimony Policy and Evidence Procedure of the ICRC, which have been derived from the provisions of verdict decisions of the International Criminal Tribunal Court of the Former Yugoslavia.

== Academic ==
For a year in 2003 he served as a Legal Advisor to the American University of Afghanistan then as a member of the Trustee Board of the mentioned university from 2004 to 2010, and he is one of the founders of the American University of Afghanistan.

== Early life and education ==
Gran was born on January 14, 1958, in the Farah province where his father was a military commander, but he is natively from Laghman province and belongs to the Sahak of the Pashtun tribe.

He graduated from Zahir Shah high school in Kandahar Province in 1974. Gran received a Bachelor of Arts in Law and Political Sciences, with the major of “Quantitative Political Analysis” from Canyon College (USA). He has also attended various training and fellowship programs including constitutional law in the National School of Administration (ENA) Paris, France, Legislative Drafting Fellowship from Tulane University, The Public Law school New Orleans, United States. International Treaties, Rules and Principles of war during combat Sri Lanka, Parliamentary Affairs, International law, Budgeting and Parliamentary Oversight at WBI in Washington, DC, Leadership management, Budget and Audit which were held in various countries including Japan, United States, Germany], France, Italy and India. Thus, received various fellowships from some other countries.

== Political and civil activities ==
Gran was imprisoned due to his opposing activities against the former Soviet Union invasion of Afghanistan in Pul-e-Charkhi prison in the early 80s. Gran is one of the human rights and women's rights advocates and a member of the working group of UN Women in Afghanistan. Gran is a founding member of the Afghanistan Constitutional Studies Institute since 2015. This Institute has done some research and works for the Constitutional reforms and significant reform for the political and constitutional order of Afghanistan, including research published book “Towards a Constitutional Court in Afghanistan- A Proposal”.

Gran is a member of the Lawyer Association of Afghanistan. Since 2009, Gran is a member of Parliamentary Network for Prevention of Conflicts, East West Institute – Brussels, Belgium. He is a member of Institute for Law and Society in Afghanistan ILSAF ( Berlin- Germany based organization).

== Publications ==
Gran is an author of a number of political, legal, historical and regional geopolitics articles in the Afghan press and other international publications. Some of these articles are available on Google in English, Pashto and Dari languages.

== Awards ==
Gran was awarded with the Mir Masjidi Khan National Medal and Merit letters by the President of the Republic for four times, and the President of the House in respect to his meritorious Professional Parliamentary Services.

== Personal life ==
Gran is married and has two sons, Ahmad Rashid Gran, Khoshal Gran and a daughter, Lamar Zala Gran. His wife is Laila Gran who is an English teacher. Gran's hobbies include reading, hunting, swimming, and music.
