= Wardak (Pashtun tribe) =

وردګ

Languages
- Pashto

Religion
- Sunni Islam

Related ethnic groups
- Mangal · Dilazak · Afridi · Orakzai · Wazir · Banuchi • Mehsud and other Karlani Pashtun tribes

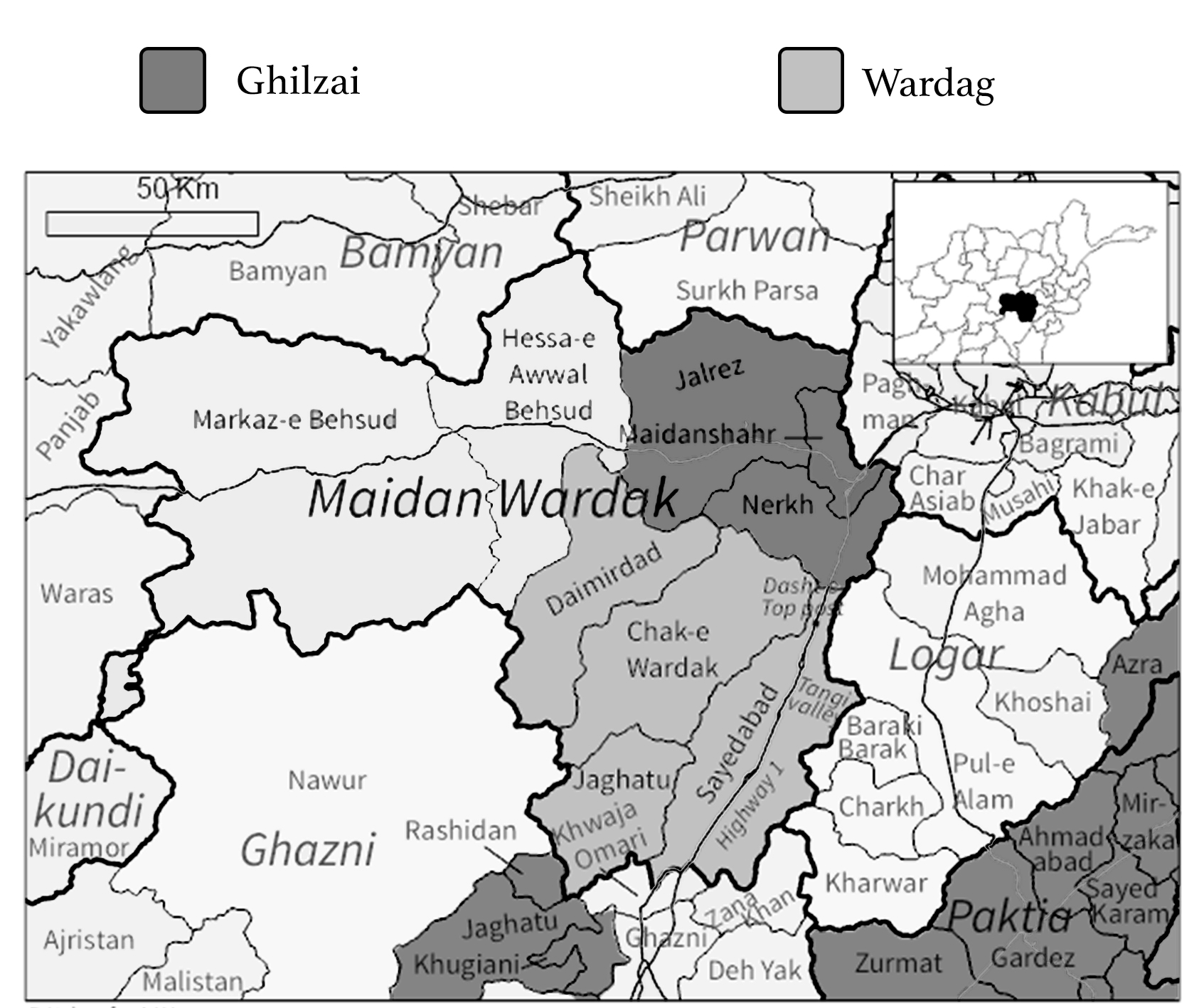
Wardak Tribe surrounded by Durrani tribe and non-Pashtun tribe people

The Wardak (Pashto: وردګ) or Wardag are a tribe of the Pashtun people that mainly live in the Wardak Province of Afghanistan. Although they are mainly found in Afghanistan, they can also be found in Peshawar, Attock and Dir in Khyber Pakhtunkhwa province of Pakistan.

Wardak, Mangal, Musazai, and Hani, are first brother Orakzais and the Dalazak tribes are Wardaks Step brothers Wardak are famous for their hospitality

== History ==
The Wardak Pashtun were notorious for their opposition to the British colonial occupiers in 1879–1880. During the Second Anglo-Afghan War, Ghazi Mohammad Jan Wardak led a force of 10,000 Afghans to rise up against the British forces near Kabul in December 1879.

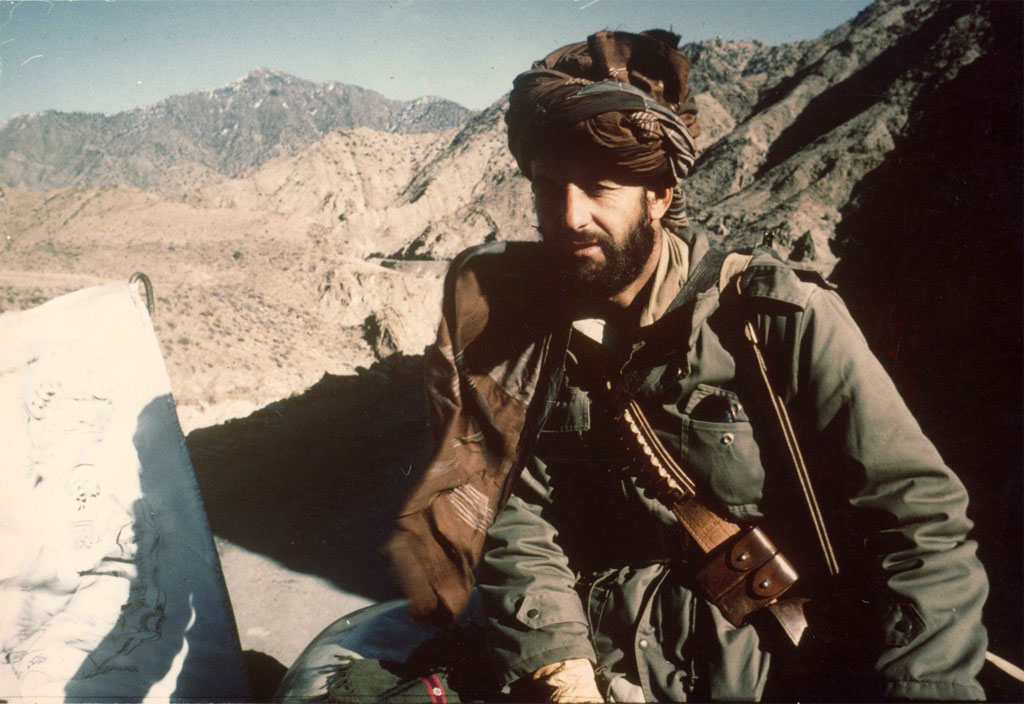
Amin Wardak, a Mujahidin commander Who defeated Soviet (Russians) in Wardak Province

== Wardak Subtribes ==
Just like other Pashtun tribes, Wardak tribe is divided into its own individual subtribes and clans

- Nuri
- Mirkhel
- Mayar

== Notable people ==
- Amin Wardak, less known Afghan US-Mujahideen fighter during the Soviet-Afghan War
- Abdul Ahad Wardak, Afghan speaker of house during the reign of King Zahir Shah
- Abdul Rahim Wardak, Afghan defence minister and former Mojahiddin
- Abdullah Wardak, Afghan Mujahideen commander turned politician who became a governor of Logar Province
- Abdul Qayum Wardak, Afghan politician and well educated figure
- Ghulam Farooq Wardak, Afghan politician who served as Minister for Education
- Ghulam Sediq Wardak, Afghan inventor
- Dr. Roshanak Wardak, Afghan Doctor and MP.
