= Alam Gul Kuchi =

Hajji Alam Gul Kuchi is an Afghan politician, the parliamentary representative of the Kuchi nomads in the Wolesi Jirga.

== Parliamentary dispute in 2008 ==
In the 9 April 2008 session of the Afghan parliament, dozens of representatives left the chamber in protest against remarks made by Haji Alam Gul Kuchi. The incident occurred over disagreements on a draft version of Afghanistan's electoral law. Specifically, the draft included an item that allows for the Kuchi nomads to have the right to vote in any constituency all over the country, while the rest of the population can only vote in their respective provincial constituencies. The item in question was protested to be against article 22 of Afghan constitution which says no ethnic group could have any advantage over the other.

Following the protest of non-Pashtuns and non-Kuchi representatives against the particular item in the draft electoral law, the Kuchi representative Haji Alam Gul sparked a standoff when he said that "Kuchis are the real people/inhabitants of Afghanistan, other groups [Tajiks, Hazaras, Uzbeks, etc] are all immigrants." He later added that there's nothing wrong with his statement because "that's true that we [Kochis, and Pashtuns?] are the majority and we are the heirs of this land."
