= Shahzada Shahid =

Afghan politician

- Occupation: legislator

Mawlawi Shahzada Shahid was elected to represent Kunar Province in Afghanistan's Wolesi Jirga, the lower house of its National Legislature, in 2005.

A report from the Navy Postgraduate School on Kunar stated that he was a religious scholar who studied in Pakistan. It mentioned that he was "associated with Sayyaf [sic] or Hezbi Islami (unclear) [sic]". It also noted that he served on the counter-narcotics committee.

In 2010, Shahzada joined a new group of legislators who called themselves the "Reformists".

According to Pahjwok Afghan News, he was re-elected to the Wolesi Jirga in 2010.

In February 2012, Afghan President Hamid Karzai appointed Shahzada to lead a delegation to investigate the deaths of civilians in Konar and Kapisa provinces caused by NATO forces.
