= Hemat Akhundzada =

Afghan politician

Acting Minister of Education
- In office 23 August 2021 – 7 September 2021
- Preceded by: Rangina Hamidi
- Succeeded by: Noorullah Munir

Hemat Akhundzada (Pashto: همت اخوندزاده) is an Afghan politician and member of the Taliban. He served as acting education minister of the Islamic Emirate of Afghanistan from 23 August to 7 September 2021.
