= Fariba =

Fariba or Fareba (Persian: فریبا) is a Persian name and it means alluring, charming, attractive. It is popular in Iran and Afghanistan. Noted individuals with the name include:

Surname

- Behtash Fariba (born 1955), retired Iranian football player

Given name

- Fariba Adelkhah (born 1959), Franco-Iranian anthropologist
- Fariba Ahmadi Kakar (born 1965), the representative of Kandahar Province in Afghanistan's Wolesi Jirga
- Fariba Nawa (born 1973), Afghan-American freelance journalist
- Fariba Vafi (born 1962), Iranian author
