= Sakhaullah =

Afghan politician

Maulwi Sakhaulla سخاو الله

Deputy Minister of Education
- Incumbent
- Assumed office 4 October 2021 (Note: Acting: 4 October 2021 – 15 August 2025) Serving with Saeed Ahmad Shahid Khel
- Prime Minister: Mohammad Hassan Akhund
- Minister: Noorullah Munir
- Supreme Leader: Hibatullah Akhundzada

Personal details
- Party: Taliban
- Occupation: Politician, Taliban member

Maulwi Sakhaullah (Pashto: مولوي سخاو الله) is an Afghan Taliban politician who is currently serving as Deputy Minister of Education of the Islamic Emirate of Afghanistan since 4 October 2021 alongside Saeed Ahmad Shahid Khel.
