= Sahib Rahman =

Afghan politician

- Died: November 6, 2007; Baghlan
- Occupation: Legislator

Al-Haj Sahib Rahman was elected to represent Kunar Province in Afghanistan's Wolesi Jirga, the lower house of its National Legislature, in 2005. He was assassinated by a suicide bomber on November 6, 2007.

A report on Kunar prepared at the Navy Postgraduate School stated that he was an associate of Pir Gailani [sic]. It stated he was from the Mushwarnary tribe, and a member of the Pashtun ethnic group. It stated he sat on the economics committee.
