= Hanif Shah al-Hussaini =

- Occupation: legislator

Mawlawi Hanif Shah al-Hussaini was elected to represent Khost Province in Afghanistan's Wolesi Jirga, the lower house of its National Legislature, in 2005.

A report on Khost prepared at the Navy Postgraduate School stated that he "was associated with Hezbi Islami, and possibly the Qanooni faction". It stated that he was a member of the Pashtun ethnic group. It stated he was a high school graduate. It stated he sat on the Justice Committee.
