= Ishaqzai =

Tribe of Pashtun people

The Ishaqzai (Pashto: اسحاقزى; ey-sock-zah-ye) are a prominent Pashtun tribe in Afghanistan. Most Ishaqzais are in Afghanistan, particularly in the provinces of Farah, Nimruz, Helmand and Kandahar. Some are living outside of Afghanistan among the Afghan diaspora.

== Notable people ==
- Malali Ishaqzai

== See also ==
- Pashtuns
