= Malalai Shinwari =

Afghan politician

Malalai Shinwari ملالی شینوارۍ
- Occupations: Former Member of the Wolesi Jirga and former presidential advisor
- Known for: Advocacy for the rights of women in Afghanistan

Malalai Shinwari (Pashto: ملالی شینوارۍ) was a member of the Wolesi Jirga for Kabul Province, Afghanistan.

== Biography ==
In the 2005 Afghan parliamentary election, Shinwari ranked first in votes among female candidates in Kabul.
