= Princes' quarter (Red Fort) =

Coordinates: 28.658887°N 77.243261°E

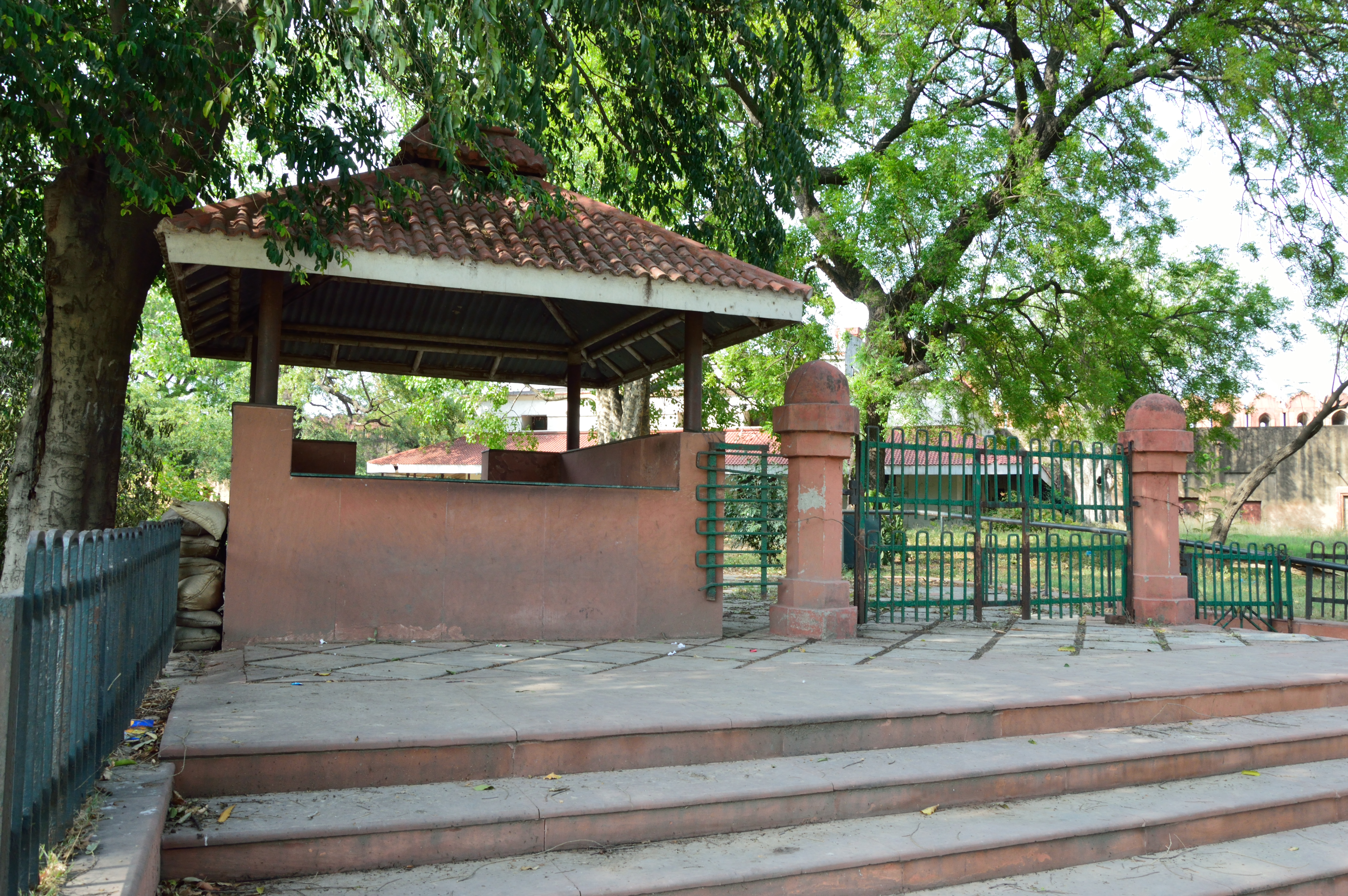
Area of the former princes' quarter

The Princes' quarter is an area located in the Red Fort of Old Delhi, India.

The quarter of the imperial princes dates back to the late Mughal Empire period. The one structure that has survived has been altered throughout course of time, therefore losing its original appearance. The structure was the first palace built in north Delhi that was constructed for the princes, and served as a home to many members of the Mughal royal family.

After the Indian Rebellion of 1857, occupying British forces converted the palace into a meeting and amusement hall and named it the "Tea House". In his 1919 book "Monuments of Delhi: lasting splendor of the great Mughals and others", Maulvi Zafar Hassan described the structure as a pavilion. The palace underwent some renovation and is open for visitors as a tea house and tourist shop.
