= Sayed Durahman =

Afghan politician

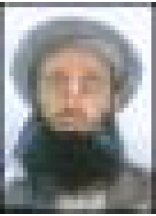
- Occupation: Member of the Wolesi Jirga
- Title: Mawlawi

Sayed Durahman is a member of the Wolesi Jirga for Lagham Province, Afghanistan. He is an ethnic Pashtun. He has a degree in Islamic Affairs. Prior to being elected to the national legislature he was a madrassa teacher.
