= 1931 Afghan parliamentary election =

- 1931

All 111 seats in the House of the People

Parliamentary elections were held in Afghanistan in 1931.

== Background ==
In 1930 King Mohammad Nadir Shah convened a 286-member Great Assembly to confirm his succession to the throne, which met in September that year. The Great Assembly then elected a 105-member National Council that was to continue meeting. The 1923 Constitution was amended to create a bicameral parliament with a lower house (the House of the People) and an upper house (House of the Notables). The House of the People was planned to be convened in April 1931, but was not able to meet until July.

== Electoral system ==
Of the 111 members of the House of the People, Kabul elected 24, Kandahar 17, Eastern Province 15, Qataghan and Badakshan 15, Herat 11, Mazar 11, Southern Province 10, Maimana 5 and Farah 3.

== Aftermath ==
The newly elected House of the People met for the first time in early July. Abdul Ahad Wardak became speaker. The House of the Notables was established in September, and a new constitution was promulgated on 31 October 1931 after being approved by the National Council.
