= Hamidullah =

Hamidullah or Hameedullah (Arabic: حمید اللہ) is a male Muslim given name, and in modern usage surname, composed of the elements Hamid and Allah. It may refer to:

== Males ==
- Hamidullah Khan (1894–1960), Nawab of Bhopal
- Hamid Ullah Afsar (1895–1974), Indian Urdu poet and writer
- Hasan Hamidulla, Finnish Tatar writer, publisher, entrepreneur
- Muhammad Hamidullah (1908–2002), Hyderabadi Islamic Scholar (born in Hyderabad State)
- Mirza Hameedullah Beg (born 1913), Chief Justice of India
- Hamidullah Enayat Seraj (born 1917), Afghan Diplomat
- Muhammad Hamidullah Khan (born 1938), Bangladesh air force officer
- Hamidullah Amin (born 1941), Afghan geographer
- Hamidullah (Bagram detainee) (born 1967), Afghan prisoner
- Hameedullah Khan Tokhi, Afghan politician
- Hamidullah Niyazmand, Afghan provincial governor
- Hamidullah Qalandarzai, Afghan provincial governor

== Females ==
- Zaib-un-Nissa Hamidullah (1921–2000), Pakistani writer and journalist
