= Mayar =

Mayar may refer to:

== People ==
- Mayar (tribe), a Pashtun tribe in parts of Pakistan and Afghanistan

=== Given name ===
- Mayar Hany, Egyptian squash player
- Mayar Sherif, Egyptian tennis player

=== Surname ===
- Harsh Mayar, Indian actor
- Himayat Ullah Mayar, Pakistani politician
- Ubaid Ullah Mayar, Pakistani politician
- Abdurahman Mayar, Afghani Taoiseach

== Places ==
- Mayar, Mardan, Khyber Pakhtunkhwa, Pakistan
- Mayar, Lower Dir, Khyber Pakhtunkhwa, Pakistan
- Mayar (mountain), Angus, Scotland
- Mayar Khil (village), Chak District, Wardak province, Afghanistan
- Mayar, Chad

== Other ==
- Mayar Badhon, 1997 Bengali film

== See also ==
- Majar (disambiguation)
- Maiar
