= Saleh Mohammad Registani =

Afghan politician

- Born: 1963 (age 62–63)
- Occupations: Military commander and politician

Saleh Mohammad Registani (born 1963) is a senior military commander in the National Resistance Front and a former politician from Panjshir Province. He is an ethnic Tajik.

During the Democratic Republic of Afghanistan, Registani joined Ahmad Shah Massoud's forces. In the late 1990s he was appointed as the military attaché of the ousted-Islamic State of Afghanistan to Dushanbe, Tajikistan. After the formation of the Afghan Interim Administration in late 2001, he was appointed as the military attache to Moscow, Russia, where he served until 2004.

During the parliamentary elections of 2005, he was elected representative of Panjshir Province to Afghanistan's House of Representatives or Wolesi Jirga, where he had served till 2021. After the fall of Kabul, he fled Afghanistan and joined the National Resistance Front, in which he serves as a senior commander. He reportedly returned to Afghanistan in 2026 and resides in the Hindu Kush to continue the insurgency against the Islamic Emirate of Afghanistan.

He is the author of the Persian language Massoud: Shaheed Raahe Sulh wa Azadi.

== See also ==
- Hasib Quwayi Markaz
