= Alami Balkhi =

Afghan politician

Sayed Hussain Alami Balkhi سید حسین عالمی بلخی
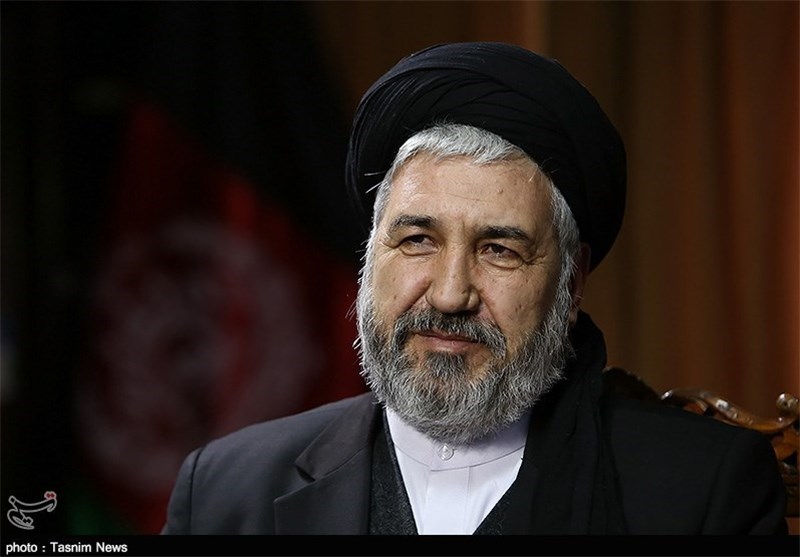

Personal details
- Born: 1957 (age 67–68); Charkint, Balkh province, Kingdom of Afghanistan

Sayed Hussain Alami Balkhi, (Dari: سید حسین عالمی بلخی) most known as Alami Balkhi, is an Afghan former politician who represented to the Wolesi Jirga, the lower house of its national legislature. He was elected to represent Kabul Province in 2005.

== Early life ==
Sayed Hussain Alami Balkhi, son of Sayed Mir Aqa, was born on 1957 in Charkint district of Balkh province. He is from the Hazara ethnic group of Sayed family. According to the report he is "associated with [Yunus] Qanuni's political faction. According to the report he is the chair of the Justice Committee. According to the report he may have a PhD. According to the report he "is the deputy in the National Unity Front."
