= Noorullah Munir =

Education Minister of Afghanistan since 2021

Noorullah Munir نورالله منیر

Acting Minister of Education
- In office 7 September 2021 – 20 September 2022
- Prime Minister: Mohammad Hassan Akhund (acting)
- Deputy: Maulvi Sakhaullah; Saeed Ahmad Shahid Khel
- Supreme Leader: Hibatullah Akhundzada
- Preceded by: Hemat Akhundzada
- Succeeded by: Habibullah Agha

Personal details
- Party: Taliban
- Occupation: Politician, Taliban member

Noorullah Munir (Pashto: نورالله منیر [nʊrʊˈlɑ muˈnɪr]) is an Afghan politician who served as the education minister of the Islamic Emirate of Afghanistan from 7 September 2021 until 20 September 2022.

== Policies ==
Munir has stated in 2021 that women may continue their education in accordance with sharia. However, he indicated that while subjects such as physics will remain intact, other academic subjects such as music must be in line with Islamic law.
