= Ahmad Shah Khan Asakzai =

Afghan politician

- احمد شاه خان آچکزی
- Born: 1942 (age 83–84); Kandahar Province, Afghanistan
- Occupation: legislator

Hajji Ahmad Shah Khan Asakzai احمد شاه خان اچکزی is an Afghan politician who was elected to represent Kandahar Province in Afghanistan's Wolesi Jirga, the lower house of its National Legislature, in 2005. A report on Kandahar prepared at the Navy Postgraduate School stated he is from the Pashtun ethnic group. He is a tribal elder from Spin Boldak, who sits on the Armed Service Committee.

Haji Ahmad shah khan Achakzai, son of Haji Shah Ghasi Achakzai, was born in 1942 in Bambol Konchai District, Kandahar Province.

Achakzai saib was the chief of police of Takhtapol District, Ragistan and Speen Boldak in the Era of president Mohammad Najibullah Ahmadzai in 1947–1996.

Haji Ahmad shah Khan was a tribal leader of the Achakzai family.
