= Obaidullah (Kandahar politician) =

Afghan Politician

- Occupation: legislator

Obaidullah was elected to represent Kandahar Province in Afghanistan's Wolesi Jirga, the lower house of its National Legislature, in 2005. A report on Kandahar prepared at the Navy Postgraduate School stated he was a high school graduate, that he served on the Economic committee, and that there was a controversy in his election.

One of the two vice-presidential running mates of Abdul Majid Samim, during Afghanistan's 2009 Presidential election, was named Obaidullah.
