= Jamil Karzai =

Member of the Afghanistan House of the People

- Born: Kandahar
- Occupation: legislator

Jamil Karzai is an Afghan politician. He was elected to represent Kabul Province in Afghanistan's Wolesi Jirga, the lower house of its National Legislature, in 2005. Jamil is the nephew of former Afghan president Hamid Karzai.
