= 2004 Constitution of Afghanistan =

Supreme law of Afghanistan until 2021

The 2004 Constitution of Afghanistan was the supreme law of the Islamic Republic of Afghanistan, which lasted from 2004 to 2021. It served as the legal framework between the Afghan government and the Afghan citizens. Although Afghanistan (Afghan Empire) was made a state in 1747 by Ahmad Shah Durrani, the earliest Afghan constitutional movement began during the reign of Emir Abdur Rahman Khan in the 1890s followed by the drafting in 1922 of a constitution. The 1964 Constitution of Afghanistan transformed Afghanistan into a modern democracy.

The constitution was approved by the consensus in January 2004 after the 2003 loya jirga. The Constitution consists of 162 articles and was officially signed by Hamid Karzai on January 26, 2004. It evolved out of the Afghan Constitution Commission mandated by the Bonn Agreement. The constitution provides for an elected President and National Assembly. The transitional government of interim president Hamid Karzai was put in place after the June 2002 loya jirga. The first presidential elections after the new constitution was in effect, took place in October 2004, and Karzai was elected to a five-year term. The first elections for the National Assembly were delayed until September 2005. The constitution was essentially abolished on August 15, 2021, with the overthrow and dissolution of the Islamic Republic of Afghanistan by the Taliban. In August 2022, it was confirmed to the public that Supreme Leader Hibatullah Akhundzada had earlier formally abolished the 2004 Constitution on his authority.

== Eligibility of President ==
Article 62 of the Constitution of Afghanistan of 2004 stated that a candidate for the office of President must:

- be a Muslim citizen of Afghanistan, born of Afghan parents;
- not be a citizen of another country;
- be at least forty years old;
- not have been convicted of crimes against humanity, a criminal act or deprived of civil rights by court;
- not have previously served more than two terms as president.

== Legislative branch ==
The National Assembly of Afghanistan consisted of two houses: the Wolesi Jirga (House of the People) and the Meshrano Jirga (House of Elders).

The Wolesi Jirga, the more powerful house, consisted of a maximum of 250 delegates directly elected through a system of single non transferable vote (SNTV). Members were elected on a provincial basis and served for five years. At least 64 delegates were to be women; and ten Kuchi nomads were also elected among their peers. The Wolesi Jirga had the primary responsibility for making and ratifying laws and approving the actions of the president and had considerable veto power over senior appointments and policies

The Meshrano Jirga consisted of an unspecified number of local dignitaries and experts appointed by provincial councils, district councils, and the president. The president also appointed two representatives of the physically disabled. The lower house passed laws, approved budgets and ratified treaties – all of which required subsequent approval by the Meshrano Jirga.

== Judicial branch and court system ==
The nation's top court was the Stera Mahkama (Supreme Court). Its members were appointed by the president for 10-year terms. There were also High Courts, Appeals Courts, and local and district courts. Eligible judges had their training in either Islamic jurisprudence or secular law.

Courts were allowed to use Hanafi jurisprudence in situations where the Constitution lacks provisions.

== Cabinet ==
The current cabinet consists of the president, his two vice-presidents and 25 ministers. The ministers are appointed by the president but need approval from the Wolesi Jirga (lower house).

== Provinces and Districts ==
The constitution divides Afghanistan into 34 provinces. Each province is governed by a provincial council with members elected for four-year terms. Provincial Governors are appointed by the president. Provinces are divided into districts, which contain villages and towns. Every village and town will also have councils, with members serving for three years.

== Religion ==
The Constitution describes Islam as its sacred law and the most commonly practiced faith throughout Afghanistan.

Followers of other religions are "free to exercise their faith and perform their religious rites" within the limits of the law. There is no mention of freedom of thought, and apostasy from Islam.

== Civil and human rights ==
Citizens were guaranteed the right to life and liberty, to privacy, of peaceful assembly, from torture and of expression and speech. If accused of a crime, citizens held the right to be informed of the charges, to representation by an advocate, and to presumption of innocence. Article 34 states, "Freedom of expression shall be inviolable. Every Afghan shall have the right to express thoughts through speech, writing, illustrations as well as other means in accordance with provisions of this constitution. Every Afghan shall have the right, according to provisions of law, to print and publish on subjects without prior submission to state authorities. Directives related to the press, radio and television as well as publications and other mass media shall be regulated by law."

Provisions are made to ensure free education and healthcare for all citizens.

== Language ==
Article 16 of the constitution states that "from amongst Pashto, Dari, Uzbek, Turkmen, Balochi, Pashai, Nuristani and other current languages in the country, Pashto and Dari shall be the official languages of the state." In addition, other languages are considered "the third official language" in areas where they are spoken by a majority.

Article 20 states that the Afghan National Anthem (Wolesi Tarana) "shall be in Pashto with the mention of "God is Great" as well as the names of the tribes of Afghanistan."

The constitution aims "to foster and develop all languages of Afghanistan." (Article 16)

== Land ownership ==
Foreigners are not allowed to own land in Afghanistan. Foreign individuals shall not have the right to own immovable property in Afghanistan.
