= Al-Haj Mamur Abdul Jabar Shulgari =

- Born: Afghanistan
- Occupation: legislator

Al-Haj Mamur Abdul Jabar Shilgari was elected to represent Ghazni Province in Afghanistan's Wolesi Jirga, the lower house of its National Legislature, in 2005. He belongs to the andar district of Ghazni province. Shilgari is one of the leading politicians and tribal leader from the province. He gained his reputation during the Afghan Jihad against the soviets. He is a former Mujahedin commander from Gulbuddin Hekmatyar's faction. He served in the Loya Jirga that drafted Afghanistan's new Constitution.
