= Zahera Ahmadyar Mawlayee =

Afghan politician

Personal details
- Born: Zahera Afghanistan
- Occupation: legislator
- Ethnicity: Hazara

Hajji Zahera Ahmadyar Mawlayee was elected to represent Ghazni Province in Afghanistan's Wolesi Jirga, the lower house of its National Legislature, in 2005. She is a member of the Hazara ethnic group. She was formerly the head of the Ghazni women's shura. She was a University Physics and Math instructor at a medical faculty. She has worked with non-governmental organizations.
