= Habibullah Agha =

Afghan politician

- حبیب الله آغا

Minister of Education
- Incumbent
- Assumed office 21 September 2022 (Note: Acting: 21 September 2022 – 15 August 2025)
- Prime Minister: Mohammad Hassan Akhund
- Supreme Leader: Hibatullah Akhundzada
- Preceded by: Noorullah Munir

Personal details
- Born: 1954 or 1955 Vach Bakhto, Shah Wali Kot, Kandahar, Kingdom of Afghanistan
- Party: Taliban
- Occupation: Politician, cleric, member of Taliban

Sheikh Hadith Maulvi Habibullah Agha Sab (Pashto: مولوي حبيب الله اغا) is a Minister of Education of Islamic Emirate of Afghanistan. He is part of the Taliban's hardliner group and Hibatullah Akhundzada loyalist.

== Early life ==
Habibullah Agha was born in Vach Bakhto, Shah Wali Kot, Kandahar in 1954 or 1955. He received basic Islamic education in his village. Agha continued his higher Islamic education in Pakistan.

== Career ==
Under the first Taliban government (1996-2001), Agha was a judge. He also became Mullah Omar special adviser and the Taliban's spiritual leader.

On 21 September 2022, Hibatullah Akhundzada appointed Agha as the minister of education. His appointment is considered a setback for women's education progress. He started to work as a minister of education on 26 September 2022. On 22 December 2022, he issued a temporary ban for girl school and educational courses above six grades.

== Views ==
Agha is against open criticism of the Taliban government officials. He suggested that criticism should be said in the government office.

== International Sanctions ==
On 20 July 2023, Habibullah Agha was sanctioned by the European Union as a government official personally responsible for gross human rights violations in Afghanistan by introducing a policy of denying access to secondary education for girls, thus preventing them from exercising their right to education and not to be subjected to discrimination on grounds of gender and further excluding women form Afghanistan's society. On 5 October 2026, citing Taliban's treatment of women, the ICC unsealed arrest warrant for Agha.
