= Amir Khan Sabri =

- Occupation: legislator

Hajji Amir Khan Sabri was elected to represent Khost Province in Afghanistan's Wolesi Jirga, the lower house of its National Legislature, in 2005. A report on Khost prepared at the Navy Postgraduate School stated that he was a member of the Pashtun ethnic group. It stated he had a ninth grade education. It stated he was "associated with Hezbi Islami. It stated he sat on the Legislatures Communications Committee.
