= Toorpekai =

Afghan politician

- Occupation: legislator

Toorpekai was elected to represent Zabul Province in Afghanistan's Wolesi Jirga, the lower house of its National Legislature, in 2005.

A report on Kandahar prepared at the Navy Postgraduate School described her working with the UNAMA on health care. It stated that she was a high school graduate. It stated she sat on the Communications Committee. It stated she was a member of the Pashtun ethnic group, from the Suliemankhel tribe.
