= Gul Haar Jalal =

Afghan politician from Kandahar

- Occupation: legislator

Gul Haar Jalal was elected to represent Kandahar Province in Afghanistan's Wolesi Jirga, the lower house of its National Legislature, in 2005. A report on Kandahar prepared at the Navy Postgraduate School stated she is a member of the Pashtun ethnic group, from Nurhar district. It stated that prior to her election she had been the head of an orphanage. It stated that she sat on the Disabled and Martyrs Committee. It stated she was a widow whose husband was assassinated. It stated that she was a high school graduate, who once traveled to Paris.
