= Ameer Lali =

Ameer Lali آمیر لالی
- Occupation: legislator

Hajji Ameer Lali امیر لالی was elected to represent Kandahar Province in Afghanistan's Wolesi Jirga, the lower house of its National Legislature, in 2005. A report on Kandahar prepared at the Navy Postgraduate School stated he was a member of the Pashtun ethnic group, from the same Popolzai tribe as President Hamid Karzai. They stated he was a "demobilized local commander". He sits on the Armed Services Committee.
