= Ali Mohammad (Afghan politician) =

Afghan politician

- Occupation: Afghani politician

Hajji Ali Mohammad was a politician representing Logar Province in the Wolesi Jirga, the lower house of Afghanistan's national legislature. According to a report prepared by the Program for Culture and Conflict Studies at the Naval Postgraduate School, Ali Mohammed sat on the Communications Committee. They reported he might be politically affiliated with Yunus Qanuni, the speaker of the House, in addition to being a member of the Hezbi Islami.

Pajhwok Afghan News reported on February 25, 2012, that Ali Mohammad's son Khalid had been kidnapped. The identity or affiliation of the kidnappers was unknown.

Since the Taliban seized power in 2021, the Afghanistan national legislature has effectively been dissolved.
