= Majar =

Majar may refer to:

- Majar (Golden Horde), an ancient Mongol city located near today's Stavropol, Russia
- Matija Majar (1809–1892), Carinthian Slovene priest and political activist
- Majar, Croatia, a village near Levanjska Varoš

== See also ==
- Mayar (disambiguation)
- Mazar (disambiguation)
- Maiar
