= Anwar Khan Auriakhel =

Afghan politician

- Known for: Wolesi Jirga representative

Anwar Khan Auriakhel is a citizen of Afghanistan and a former representative to the Wolesi Jirga, the lower house of its national legislature. He was elected to represent Kabul Province in 2005.

According to a Provincial overview prepared by the Naval Postgraduate School's Program for Culture and Conflict Studies he is from the Pashtun ethnic group's Auriakhel tribe. According to the report he is "associated with Sayyaf's" political faction. According to the report he sits on the International Relations Committee. According to the report he "is a former commander from the Qarabagh district."
