= Niyaz Mohammad Amiri =

Afghani politician

Governor of Logar
- In office 2 December 2013 – 19 May 2015
- Preceded by: Mohammad Halim Fidai
- Succeeded by: Mohammad Halim Fidai

Personal details
- Born: 1961 (age 63–64); Ghazni Province, Afghanistan
- Occupation: legislator

Hajji Niyaz Mohammad Amiri was elected to represent Ghazni Province in Afghanistan's Wolesi Jirga, the lower house of its National Legislature, in 2005.

He is a member of the Pashtun ethnic group. He is related to the governors of two of Ghazni's districts. His brother, Shah Mohammad, is the Governor of the Dih Yak district. His cousin Hajji Fazell is the Governor of the Garabagh district. His family owns a prominent construction company. Afghan President Hamid Karzai appointed him as governor of Logar Province on 2 December 2013.
