= Sayed Mohmood Hasamuddeen Al-Gailani =

Sayed Mahmood Husamudin Al-Gailani
- Occupation: Legislator

Sayed Mohmood Hasamuddeen Al-Gailani was elected to represent Ghazni Province in Afghanistan's Wolesi Jirga, the lower house of its National Legislature, in 2005. An ethnic Pashtun, he is a grandson of Pir Gailani, a prominent Sufi, and leader of an Afghan political party.
