= Esmatullah Muhabat =

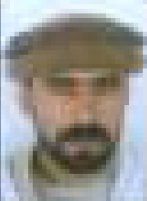
- Died: 2005-12
- Occupation: Member of the Wolesi Jirga

Esmatullah Muhabat was elected to the Wolesi Jirga, the lower house of Afghanistan's National Assembly in 2005. He was killed in December 2005.
