= Shujaul Mulik =

Shuja ul-Mulk
- Occupation: legislator

Shujaul Mulik was elected to represent Kunar Province in Afghanistan's Wolesi Jirga, the lower house of its National Legislature, in 2005.

A report on Kunar prepared at the Navy Postgraduate School stated that he had been a refugee in Pakistan. It stated that he was a high school graduate who had run a free clinic [sic]. It stated he sat on the internal security committee.

His ruling time witnessed peace and stability and he introduced appealing changes to his people.
