= Ali Akbar Qasimi =

Afghan politician (born 1954)

Ali Akbar Qasimi علی‌اکبر قاسمی

National Assembly

Personal details
- Born: Ali Akbar; 1954 (age 71–72) Nawur District, Ghazni province, Afghanistan
- Ethnicity: Hazara

Ali Akbar Qasimi (Dari: علی‌اکبر قاسمی) was elected to represent Ghazni province in Afghanistan's Wolesi Jirga, the lower house of its National Legislature, in 2005. He is a member of the Hazara ethnic group. He is a General in the Afghan National Army, and was a former commander of the 14th Division, which was garrisoned in Ghazni.
