= Sayyad Mohammad =

Afghan politician

- Occupation: legislator

Mullah Sayyad Mohammad was selected to represent Kandahar Province in Afghanistan's Meshrano Jirga, the upper house of its National Legislature, in 2005. He is a member of the Pashtun ethnic group from the Barakzai tribe. A report on Kandahar prepared at the Navy Postgraduate School stated he is from the "Payam-e-Solh political faction". It states he sits on the armed services committee. It states he has a bachelor's degree.
