= Abdul Baqi Baryal =

Afghan legislator

- Occupation: legislator

Abdul Baqi Baryal is an Afghan legislator. He represented Ghazni Province in Afghanistan's Meshrano Jirga, the upper house of its National Legislature, in 2005. Abdul Baqi Baryal is a member of the Pashtun ethnic group. He was injured by a rocket during the Soviet occupation of Afghanistan, losing a leg and his vision. He was a refugee in Pakistan until 2002. He founded an organization for disabled people when he lived in Pakistan. He is a poet, and the editor of the magazine Bright Heart.
