= Ishaq Gailani =

Pir Ishaq Gailani (born 1954) is a former member of Afghanistan's national legislature, the Wolesi Jirga. He founded the National Solidarity Movement of Afghanistan. His family includes a number of Sufi religious leaders.

Pir Ishaq Gailani has a nephew, Pir Sayed Ishaq Gailani, who has also been elected to the Wolesi Jirga, from Paktika Province, but for a different political party. His grandson, Sayed Mohmood Hasamuddeen Al-Gailani, also served in the Wolesi Jirga, representing Ghazni.
