= Abdul Ahad Wardak =

Afghan politician

Abdul Ahad Khan Wardak

Speaker of the House of People
- In office 1931–1945
- Preceded by: House of People established
- Succeeded by: Sultan Ahmad Khan

Abdul Ahad Khan Wardak (c. 1880–1949) was a politician from northern Afghanistan.

== Life ==
Wardak was the son of Kazi Ghulam and belonged to the Mayar tribe of the Wardak confederacy from Wardak province. He held the title of "Sardar-i-Ala.". From 1909 to 1916 Abdul Ahad was chief of Ushera, Arzbegi district for Amir Habibullah Khan, next appointed Governor of Qataghan-Badakhshan Province. He was later arrested with his brother for the assassination of Amir Habibullah Khan in 1919 and jailed, but was later released by Amanullah Khan. In 1922 Abdul Ahad was appointed Aide-de-Camp to King Amanullah Khan, sent to Wardak valley during the Mangal rebellion in 1924 to maintain loyalty among the Wardaks. During Amanullah's tour of Europe he spent for four months as the Governor of the Eastern Province but was relieved and sent to Moscow to meet with King Amanullah. Abdul Ahad became the Minister of Interior, in November 1928. He fled with Amanullah Khan to India in May 1929, and later went to Iran. He returned to Afghanistan in December 1929, and became the President of the Wolesi Yirga in 1931, and served until 1945 in that position. In November 1931 proceeded to Farah as supreme civil law and head of Military service. Returned to Kabul in 1932 and served on a commission negotiated with Iran in June 1933 dealing with the Helmand water dispute which was brought to a satisfactory conclusion. In October 1933, he visited Northern Afghanistan with Prime Minister Muhammad Hashim and others. Wardak was re-elected President of National Council in 1934, a position he held until 1943. He died in 1949.
