= Fariba Ahmadi Kakar =

Afghan politician

Fariba Ahmadi Kakar فریبا احمدی کاکر

Member of the House of the People from Kandahar Province
- Incumbent
- Assumed office 2018
- In office 2010–2018
- In office 2005–2010

Personal details
- Born: Fariba; 1965 (age 60–61) Afghanistan
- Occupation: legislator
- Ethnicity: Pashtun

Fariba Ahmadi Kakar (Pashto: فریبا احمدی کاکر) is an Afghan politician who was elected to represent Kandahar Province in the Wolesi Jirga, the lower house of Afghanistan's National Legislature, in 2005.

Born in 1965 in Kandahar, a report on Kandahar prepared at the Navy Postgraduate School stated she was a "self-educated teacher" and a member of the Pashtun ethnic group. She sits on the Communications Committee. In August 2013, while travelling with her children in Gazni, Afghanistan, she was kidnapped by the Taliban who demanded the release of four Taliban prisoners in exchange for the release of Mrs Kakar. On 8 September 2013, she was freed in return for the release of several family members of Taliban fighters held in captivity.

Kakar is currently living in Canada. She was married to Haji Dawood Shah, who was killed in a shooting at their residence in Kandahar in 2025.
