= Abdul Qayum Wardak =

Afghan politician (?-1999)

Minister of Mines and Industries
- In office 1972–1973

Minister of Education
- In office 1973–1975

Minister of Frontiers, Nations and Tribal Affairs (Afghanistan)
- Incumbent
- Assumed office 1974

Personal details
- Born: 1923 Wardak Province, Afghanistan
- Education: University of Illinois, Georgetown University

Abdul Qayum Wardak (c. 1923–1999) was a politician from Afghanistan. Obtained B.S. degree in mathematics, University of Illinois, 1952; and M.A. degree in Nuclear Physics, Georgetown University, 1954. Returned to Afghanistan, 1955. Graduate studies in the Soviet Union. Attended School of Nuclear Science, Lemont, Illinois, 1957. Physics Teacher, Kabul Military Academy, 1955. Member, Faculty of Science, Kabul University, 1960. Dean of Science Faculty, Kabul University, 1972. Minister of Mines and Industries, 1973–75. Minister of Education, 1974. Minister of Tribal Affaires, 1976. Married to Masuma Esmati Wardak (former Member of Parliament and Teacher at Pashto Academy).
