= Hameedullah Khan Tokhi =

- Occupation: legislator

Hameedullah Khan Tokhi was elected to represent Zabul Province in Afghanistan's Wolesi Jirga, the lower house of its National Legislature, in 2005.

A report on Kandahar prepared at the Navy Postgraduate School characterized him as a "complicated figure". It stated that he was a former Governor of the Province. It stated he sat on the Internal Security Committee.
