= Malali Ishaqzai =

Afghan politician

- Occupation: legislator

Malali Ishaqzai was elected to represent Kandahar Province in Afghanistan's Wolesi Jirga, the lower house of its National Legislature, in 2005. A report on Kandahar prepared at the Navy Postgraduate School stated she was a high school graduate. She serves on the Legislature's Government Services Committee.
