= Amin Wardak =

Amin Wardak امین وردک
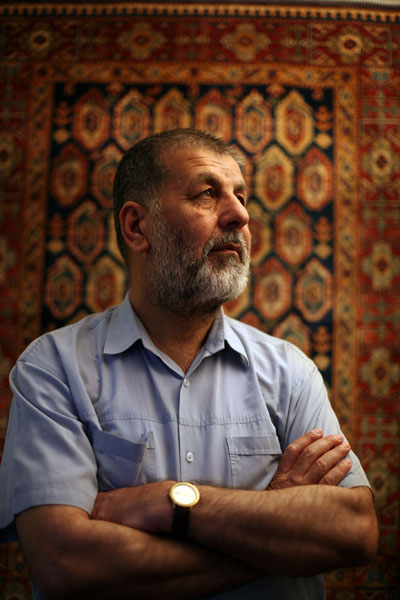
- Wardak in 2008
- Born: 1951 (age 74–75); Maidan Wardak Province, Kingdom of Afghanistan
- Occupation: Mujahideen leader

Amin Wardak (born 1951) is a major Afghan mujahideen leader who mostly fought against the Soviet-backed Democratic Republic of Afghanistan in his home region of Maidan Wardak Province during the Soviet–Afghan War in the 1980s. However, his military reach extended to the provinces of Ghazni and Kabul, and his political influence and relations with other mujahideen groups reached even further.

== Early life ==
Amin Wardak was born in 1951 in Maidan Wardak Province, Afghanistan. He was educated at the Franco-Afghan Lycée Esteqlal in Kabul, before taking his B.A. in documentation française at Kabul University.

== Resistance period ==
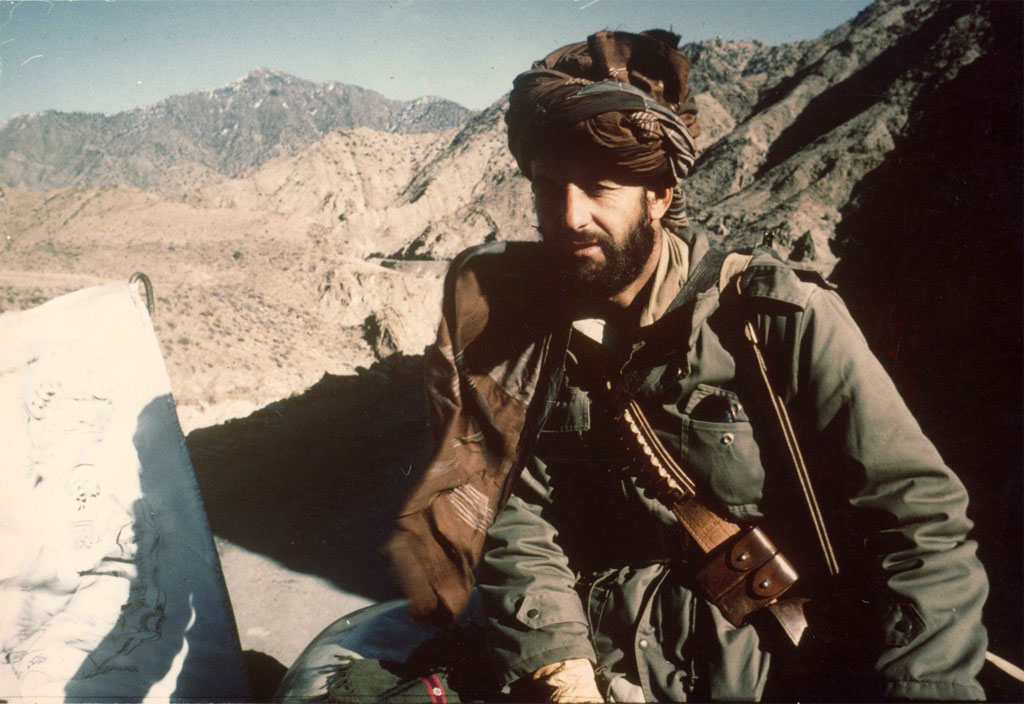
Amin Wardak in the 80's

His father and grandfather were followers of Pir Ahmed Gailani. His father introduced him to Ahmed Gailani and Amin joined Gailani's Mahaz-e Melli. A particularly active commander, he attacked Soviet and government targets as far as Ghazni and Kabul, far from the traditional territory of his clan. This caused tensions with the traditional leaders of other clans of the Wardak tribe. These other clans appealed to Pir Gailani to intervene on their behalf. The Pir pressed Amin Wardak to stop his long-range operations and diminished his weapons deliveries. As a result, Amin switched to Hezb-e Islami Khalis in 1987, or early 1988, as Khalis was more willing to supply him with weapons. In his memoirs, Amin Wardak explains that his switch to Khalis' faction did not bring any improvement in weapon supplies. To him, these factions or political groups were simply basic logisticians for real field operationals. He blames them for not having been sufficiently focused on the war against the Soviets and the needs of the populations, instead, they were more worried about their own power gaining and their political aims. In respect to himself, Amin Wardak writes that almost all of its weaponry stock was taken from the enemy during combat. He admits that he received very little support from Afghan political parties, but he could bear it because he had developed a strong position within his people and good links with western humanitarians. Besides, as a Pashtun leader, Amin Wardak always kept reliable and durable relations with minority ethnic communities within the country.

== Links with the West ==
In order to limit the control of the parties Amin Wardak established strong links with Westerners. Especially with the assistance of French NGOs, Amin Wardak developed his own administration in areas which he controlled, which he called the "Free province of Wardak". He established clinics and schools, instituted agricultural policies, and even printed his own postage stamps. His influence grew rapidly and extended up to the city of Ghazni.

French adventurer Patrice Franceschi fought alongside Amin Wardak and his mujahideen. He was also supported by humanitarian activist: Dr Bernard Kouchner who held the office of Minister several times in France and who is also known as an icon of what has been called the French Doctors.

== Post-Soviet period ==
In the late 1980's, when the Soviet withdrawal became inevitable, Amin Wardak was at the initiative of what was called the Council of Commanders. He has been strongly supported in this purpose by his close friend Commander Abdul Haq. Namely, significant mujahideen leaders took part in this process, as Jalaluddin Haqqani, the Hazara leader Sayid Jaglan, Qari Baba, Ahmad Shah Massoud, and so on till 300 major Commanders. The purpose of this council was to unify all Commanders in order to coordinate attacks on the communist regime and to plan the reconstruction of Afghanistan after the fall of communist regime. This quest has been sabotaged by the Afghan political parties who saw a loss of their influence in it. In his memoirs, Amin Wardak states that Massoud has certainly played the most ambiguous role during his late and hesitant participation in this unification process.

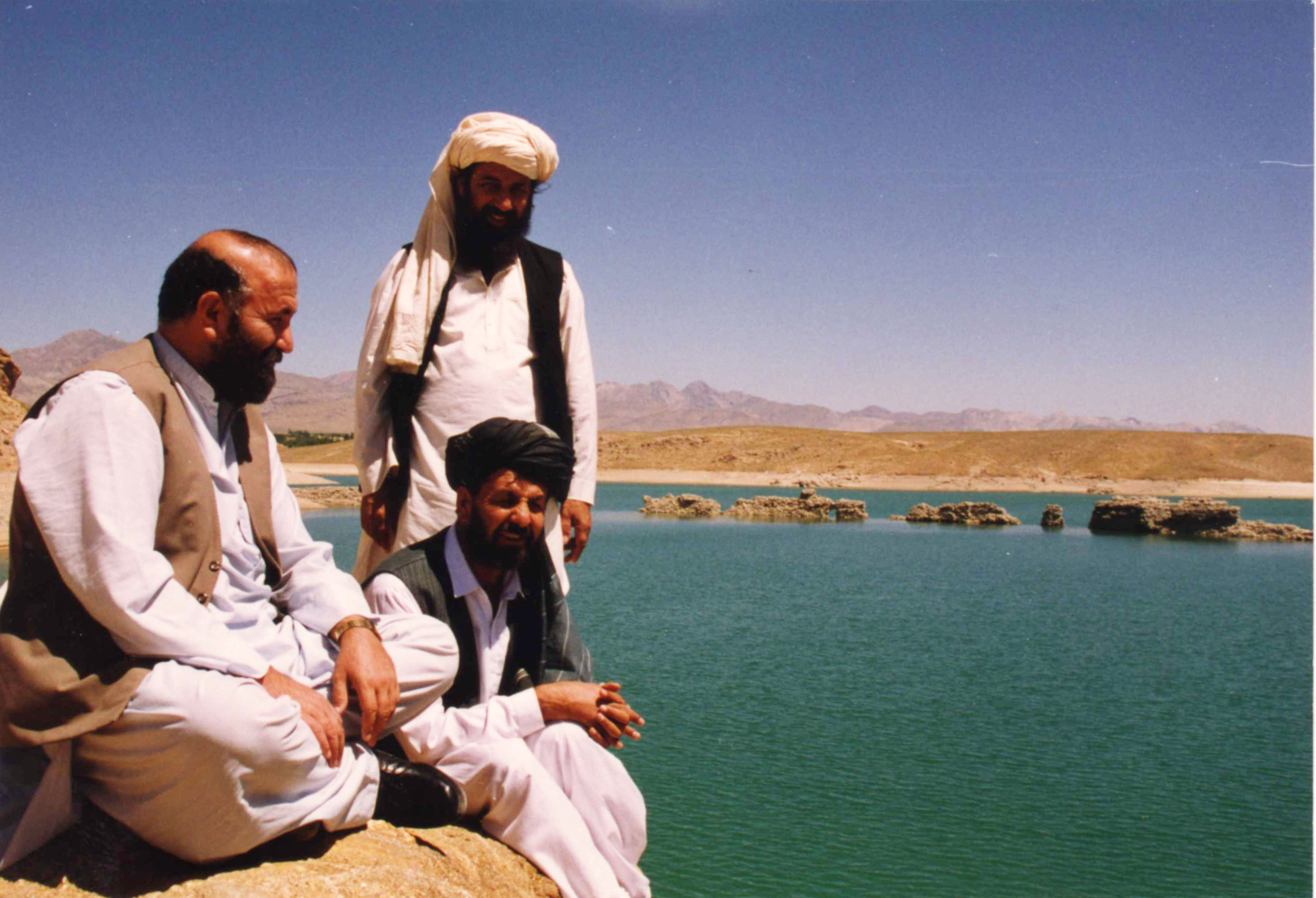
Abdul Haq (left), Amin Wardak, Akhtar Mohammad Tolwak (standing) at Band-e Sultan in Jaghatu, Wardak, in 1992. Meeting held in order to plan a security strategy in provinces, while fights had started in Kabul between several Mujahideen Commanders

In 1992, while war raged in Kabul under the Presidency of Burhanuddin Rabbani, for the first time in the history of Afghanistan Amin Wardak established free elections in the province of Wardak in order to elect its Governor. Dr Guy Caussé and Dr Joseph-Louis Rabette from Médecins du Monde witnessed it while they were in Wardak at that time. The aim was to ensure political and security stability for the population that feared the spread of fighting into their area. Amin Wardak didn't wish to aspire to the post, but the population claimed at least one candidate from his family. Amin Wardak asked his youngest brother Rohani Wardak (Nangyalai) to run for elections. Rohani won handily and became Governor of Wardak. He held this position until the arrival of the Taliban and then presented his resignation. He left a very positive image and is still living amid his people. Today, Rohani Wardak is considered as the strong man in the region (as a traditional leader) because of the local support that he possesses.

== Expatriation ==
In 1995, Amin Wardak had to flee Afghanistan because he was under serious threat due to its very critical position against the mujahideen who took part in the civil war between 1992 and 1996. In his memoirs, Amin Wardak calls it "War for Power". This war also gave birth to the Taliban movement, whom then received broad popular support in their first years. Since, Amin Wardak lived in exile in France, but continues to return home often.

== Memoirs ==
In 2009, the French publishing house Arthaud of Flammarion Group published Amin Wardak's War Memoirs.
