= Mayar (tribe) =

Ethnic Pashtun tribe

Mayar ماېار
- Ethnicity: Pashtun
- Location: Afghanistan, Pakistan (Khyber Pakhtunkhwa)
- Parent tribe: Karlani
- Language: Pashto
- Religion: Islam

Mayar (ماېار) is a Pashtun tribe in Khyber Pakhtunkhwa and in some parts of Afghanistan. Wardak, Mangals, Musazai, and Hani, are first brother Orakzais and the Dilazak tribes are Wardak's stepbrothers. Just like other Pashtun tribes, Wardak tribe is divided into subtribes and clans: Nuri, Mirkhel, and Mayar.

People belonging to the Mayar tribe mostly live in Mardan, Katlang, Parkho Dheri, Upper Dir and Bajorh Agency. There are two places named Mayar in Pakistan where most Mayar people live: Mayar Mardan and Mayar Katlang.
