= Rangina Hamidi =

Afghan-American activist, writer and politician

- رنگینه حمیدي
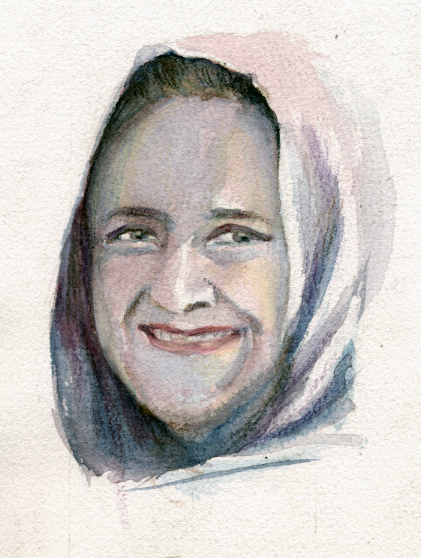
- A watercolor portrait of Rangina Hamidi

Acting Minister of Education of Afghanistan
- In office 2020–2021
- President: Ashraf Ghani

Personal details
- Born: 1978 (age 47–48) Kandahar, Afghanistan
- Parent: Ghulam Haider Hamidi
- Education: University of Virginia (BA, religious studies and gender studies)
- Occupation: Writer; Educator; Social activist; Politician
- Known for: Founder of Kandahar Treasure
- Awards: CNN Heroes finalist (2007)

Rangina Hamidi (Pashto: رنگینه حمیدي; born 1978) is an Afghan-American writer, educator, social activist, and politician. She is well known as an advocate for women's rights in Afghanistan and has engaged in various social projects to empower girls and women in Afghanistan. Hamidi has served as an education minister of Afghanistan, until the Taliban takeover of Afghanistan with the fall of Kabul in 2021. She was the first female education minister of Afghanistan. During the Afghanistan being taken over by the Taliban, she vowed to stay in Afghanistan and continue her humanitarian efforts by actively involving in empowerment of Afghan women. However, after several weeks, she fled with her family to Arizona.

== Early life ==
Rangina was born in Kandahar, Afghanistan in 1978, in a Pashtun family, to Ghulam Haider Hamidi, who was the mayor of Kandahar. Following the Soviet invasion of Afghanistan in 1980, she along with her family emigrated to Pakistan in 1981 at the age of four as a refugee and lived in Quetta. Later, she moved to the United States with her family in 1988 and was raised near Washington, D.C. She obtained her bachelor's degree with a double major in religious studies and gender studies from the University of Virginia.

== Early career ==
She returned to her native country Afghanistan in 2003 and became a permanent resident in the country. She decided to return to her motherland after the September 11, 2001 attack in the US and vowed to reconstruct and develop her native country Afghanistan. On her return to Afghanistan, she served as a manager of the Women's Income Generation Project for Afghans for Civil Society. She pioneered and spearheaded as a prominent activist with Women's Income Generation Project for Afghans for Civil Society by providing social programs and activities for women who resided in Kandahar City. She was chosen as one of the 18 finalists for the CNN 2007 Hero Award and was also selected by Radio Free Europe/Radio Liberty as the "Personality or the Week".

In 2008, she founded Kandahar Treasure which is regarded as the first women owned and women run social enterprise in Kandahar Province. She has written articles and contributed for various publications such as Asia Times, The Guardian, The Daily Telegraph, BBC, Voice of America and NPR. She co-authored and published a book along with Mary Littrell titled Embroidering within Boundaries: Afghan Women Creating a Future in 2017.

She also served on the advisory boards of Open Society Afghanistan, Afghanistan Institute for Civil Society and Afghan Women Chamber of Commerce and Industries.

== Ministry of Education ==
In 2020, Hamidi was appointed as the acting head of the Ministry of Education in Afghanistan, becoming the first woman in 30 years to lead the education ministry in the country. She stated strong support for initiatives especially targeting girls. In December that same year, the Afghan parliament rejected a vote of confidence for Hamidi in the role. Then, in January 2021, Hamidi fired 11 ministry of education advisers. The suspended advisers said there were plans to fire another 1,400 employees in the near future, with one fired employee claiming "Hamidi is practising nepotism in the Ministry of Education, she is dealing with the issues politically and in a biased way."

In March 2021, Afghanistan's Education Ministry barred schoolgirls older than 12 from singing at public events. A Ministry spokeswoman, Najeeba Arian, said the decision was made after suggestions by students and parents. The decision sparked outrage on social media platforms and criticism of Hamidi. Some observers said that these were policy maneuvers promoted by Hamidi to appease hardline religious parliamentarians. The ministry then described the ban as "misunderstood", saying it was related to measures to clamp down on mass gatherings between girls and boys in a bid to stop the spread of Coronavirus disease 2019 (COVID-19). By early April, the Ministry backtracked on a decision, with Arian issuing a statement claiming that the letter did not actually reflect the official stance of the ministry. In 2020, the education ministry faced a backlash for decreeing that students receive all lessons during their first three years of schooling in mosques to help inject an “Islamic spirit” into the students, but after public criticism, this decision was also reversed.

In July 2021, speaking at the Global Education Summit in London, Hamidi said she was confident in her country's security forces to prevent the Taliban from completely taking over all of Afghanistan and that she feared their return. “My biggest fear is, God forbid, a return of 1996 when, literally, girls were pulled out of school, schools were shut down, female teachers were sent home, female workers in any sector were sent home.”

When several high-profile politicians, including the Afghan president, Ashraf Ghani, fled from Afghanistan during the Fall of Kabul in August 2021, Hamidi decided to stay in Afghanistan to try to continue to head education efforts. In an interview with BBC World News, she expressed her shock regarding the fleeing of Ghani and revealed that she is scared of the consequences she might face. On August 23, 2021, an Afghan news agency tweeted a photo of Hamidi meeting with the Taliban, which many assumed meant she was still acting education minister. But on August 29, news accounts quoted "the new acting higher education minister, Abdul Baqi Haqqani" in stories on the Taliban requiring all classes to be separated by gender.

== Post-government activities ==
On 31 August 2021, Hamidi and her family fled Afghanistan. As of 2022, they reside in Arizona, United States, where Hamidi works at the Arizona State University.

== Bibliography ==
- Hamidi, Rangina (2017). Embroidering within Boundaries: Afghan Women Creating a Future
