= Ghulam Sediq Wardak =

Afghan inventor (born 1942)

Ghulam Sediq Wardak (born 1942) is an Afghan inventor, credited with 344 inventions to solve everyday problems, none of which are patented. He is a local hero, despite being only semi-literate, and having no formal higher education. His inventions tend to be practical devices, inspired by needs he perceives in his daily life. His first, made when he was seventeen, was a radio powered by the wearer's bodily electricity.

His single-minded attention to coming up with his inventions has led to him being called mad by many in his community. "Even if major companies have got there first, Ghulam still pushes ahead although he struggles to make a living." He has devoted himself to inventing full-time, being supported financially by his four sons.

== List of some inventions ==
Some of Sediq Wardak's inventions included:

- automatic cradle rocker
- solar-powered water pump
- solar-powered car
- electric teakettle with an automatic safety shutoff
- burglar alarm that photographs the intruder
- automatic hand-washing system
- flood warning system
- auto-rotating sprinkler
- oil paint.
