= Ministry of Education (Afghanistan) =

Afghanistan governmental education responsible for public

- Dari: وزارت معارف افغانستان; Pashto: د پوهنې وزارت افغانستان

Agency overview
- Jurisdiction: Government of Afghanistan
- Headquarters: Deh Afghanan, Opposite Kabul Municipality Kabul, Afghanistan; 34.521812°N 69.173312°E
- Minister responsible: Habibullah Agha
- Deputy Ministers responsible: Maulvi Sakhaullah; Saeed Ahmad Shahid Khel
- Website: https://moe.gov.af/en

The Afghan Ministry of Education (Dari: وزارت معارف افغانستان) (Pashto: د افغانستان د پوهنې وزارت) is responsible for policy formulation, the organization, and supervision of education in Afghanistan. Its headquarters is located in Kabul. The Ministry of Education provides a semi-annual report to inform the public of advancements in Afghanistan's education sector.

== Ministers ==
No.	Name	Term	Notes
1.	Anahita Ratebzad	1980-1981	under General Secretary Babrak Karmal
2.	Abdul Salam Hanafi	? - ?	under Emir Mohammed Omar
3.	Rasul Amin	22 December 2001 - June 2002	under President Hamid Karzai
4.	Yunus Qanuni	June 2002 - 31 August 2004	under President Hamid Karzai
5.	Ahmad Moshahed	31 August 2004 - 23 December 2004	under President Hamid Karzai
6.	Noor Mohammad Qarqin	December 23, 2004 - March 2, 2006	under President Hamid Karzai
7.	Mohammad Hanif Atmar	May 2, 2006 - October 11, 2008	under President Hamid Karzai
8.	Ghulam Farooq Wardak	October 11, 2008 – April 2015	under President Hamid Karzai
9.	Assadullah Hanif Balkhi	18 April 2015 – 13 November 2016	under President Ashraf Ghani
10.	Mohammad Ibrahim Shinwari	2016 – 2018	under President Ashraf Ghani
11.	Mirwais Balkhi	2018 – 2020	under President Ashraf Ghani
12.	Rangina Hamidi	2020 – 2021	under President Ashraf Ghani
13.	Hemat Akhundzada	23 August 2021 - 7 September 2021	under Emir Hibatullah Akhundzada
14.	Noorullah Munir	7 September 2021 – 20 September 2022	under Emir Hibatullah Akhundzada
15.	Habibullah Agha	October 2022 - present	

Former Minister of Education:

- Rasool Amin (20011222-200206)
- Yunus Qanooni (200206-20040831)
- Ahmad Moshahed (20040831-200412)
- Noor Moh. Qarqeen (20041223 -20060302)
- Hanif Atmar (200603),
- Dr. Farooq Wardak (20081022-20140930) confirmed for second term by Wolesi Jirga (20100103),
- Dr. Farooq Wardak acting Minister (20141001)
- acting Minister of Education MoE Muhammad Asef Nang (20141209)
- Dr. Asadullah Hanif Balkhi (20150418, 20160522, 20161113 impeached and acting)
- Mohammad Shah Ibrahim Shinwari, nominated (20171123)
- Dr. Mirwais Balkhi, acting (20180319, 20190107)
- Sheikh Mawlawi Munir Nurullah (20210911)
- Maulvi Habibullah Agha (20220920) acting

Deputy Minister of Education: Deputy Minister for Administration and Finance:

- Sulaiman Kakar Muhammad Suleman Kakar (20100222),
- u/i Function: Mohammad Sidiq Patman (2006, 20110326)
- Deputy Minister of Islamic studies affairs: Dr. Shafiq Samim (20111018)

Deputy Minister of Education for Technical Evaluation:

- Sarwar Azizi, (20100809)
- Muhammad Asif Nang (20101228)
- Asadullah Mohaqiq (20141013, 20170101)

Ministry of education’s deputy

- Dr. Mohammad Ibrahim Shinwari (20171111)
- Deputy Minister of Education Abdul Hakim Hemat (20220329)
- Mawlawi Sakhaullah (20211005)
- Maulvi Saeed Ahmad Shahidkhel (20211122)
