= Kochis =

Ghilji Pashtun nomadic people of Afghanistan

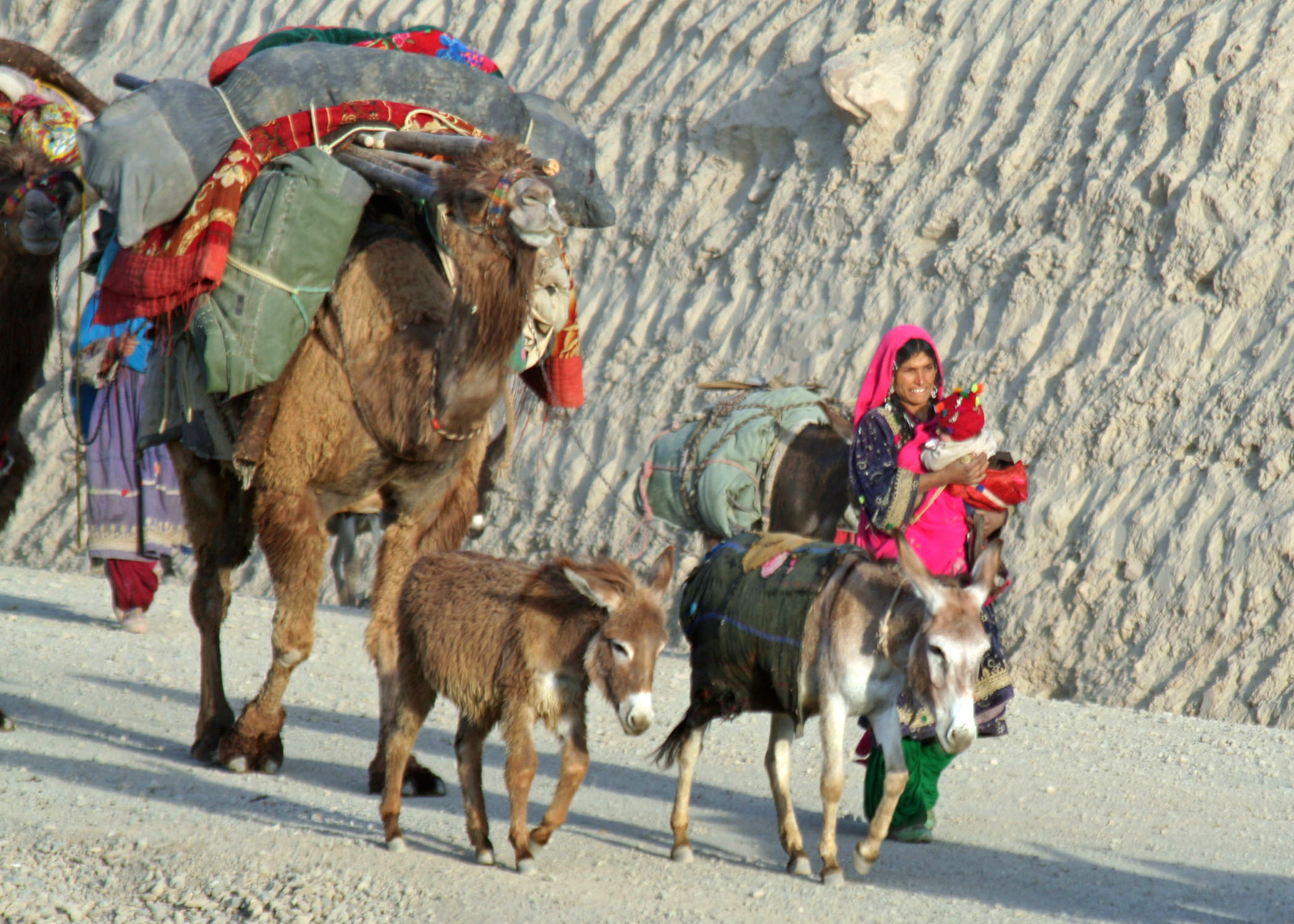
Kochi people on the move in Panjshir Province of Afghanistan

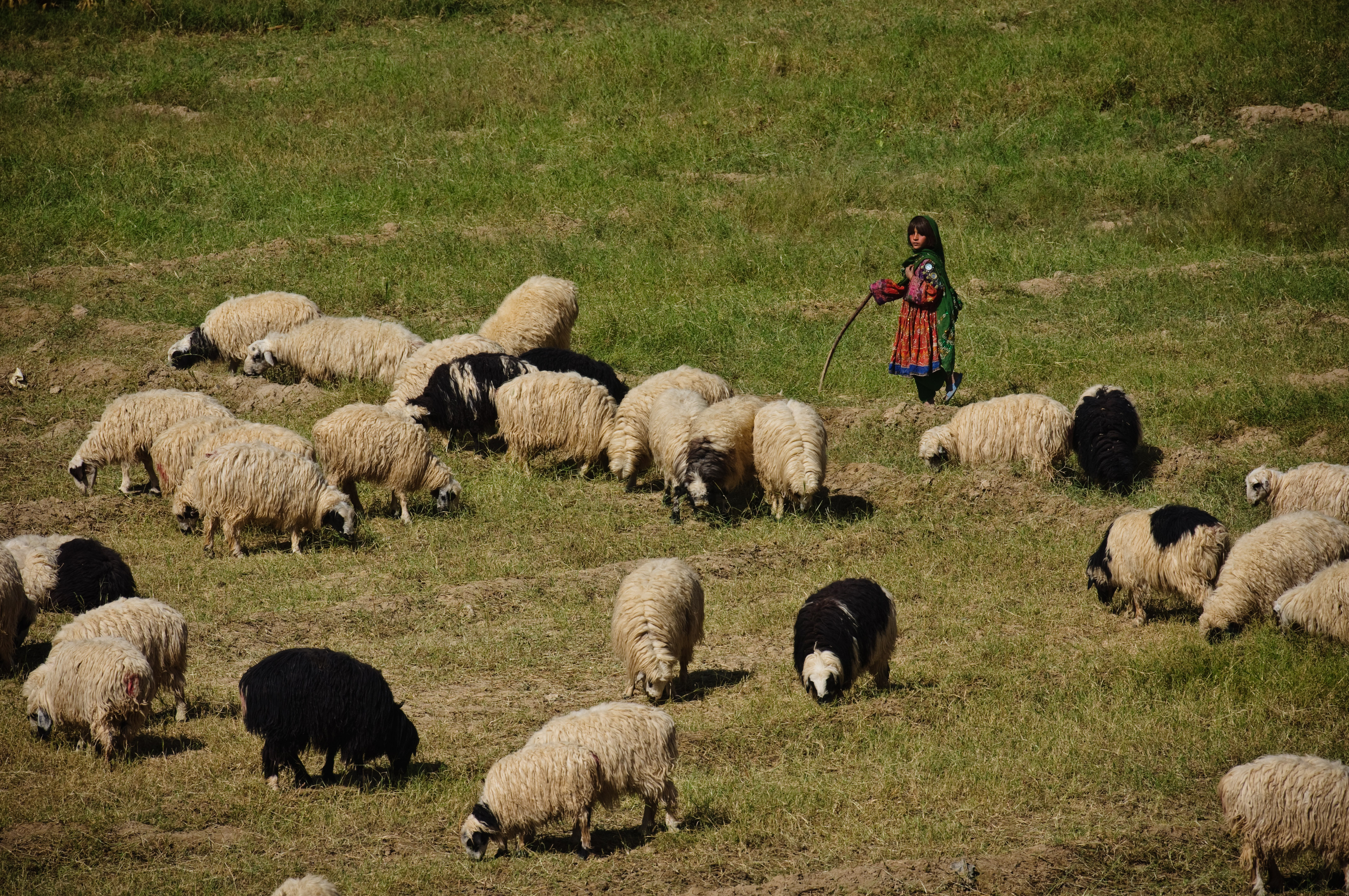
A Kochi girl in southern Afghanistan with her sheep

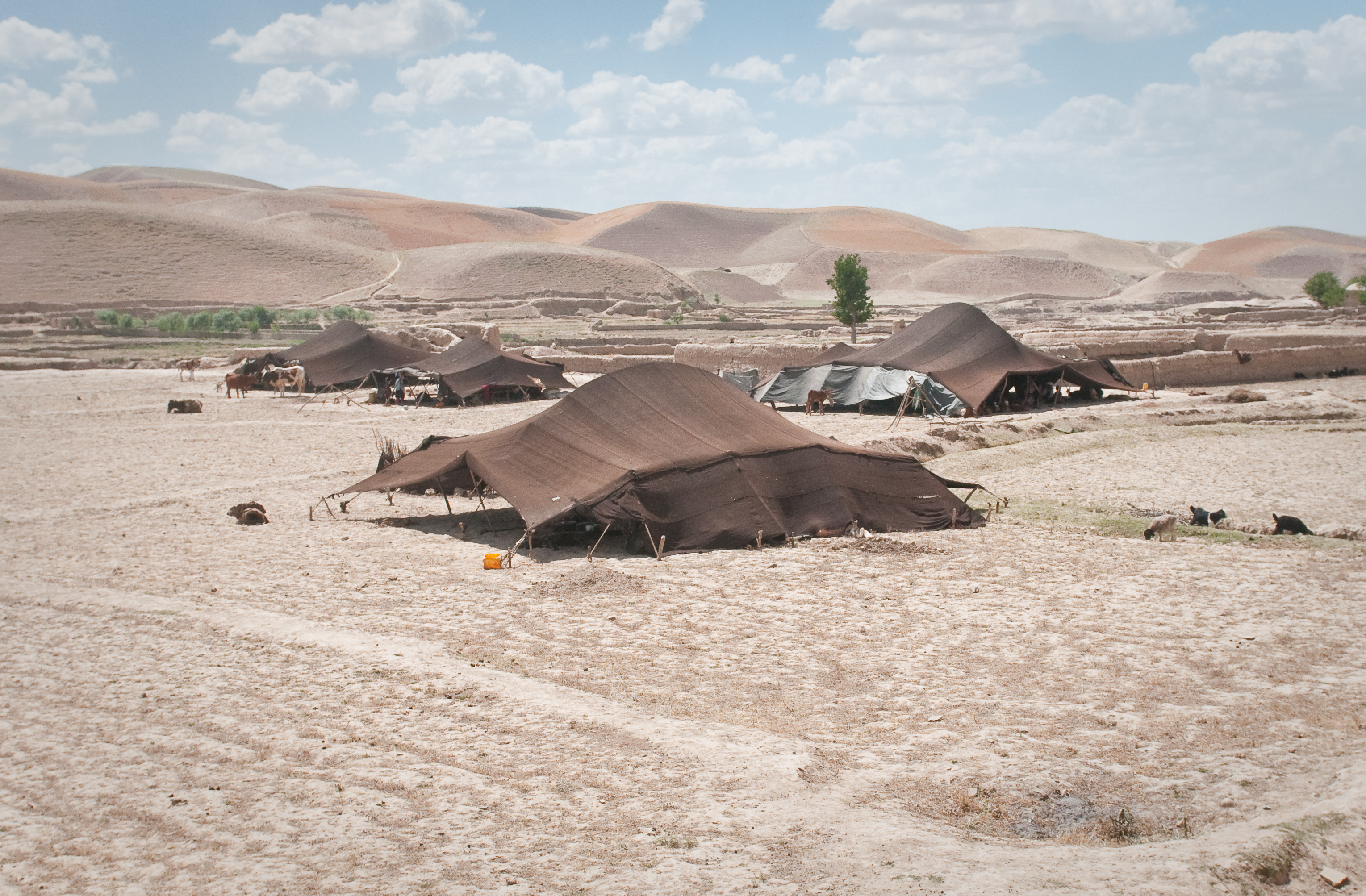
Tents of Kochi nomads in Badghis Province of Afghanistan

Kochis or Kuchis (Pashto: کوچۍ) are Pashtun pastoral nomads belonging primarily to the Barakzai and Ghilzai Tribes of Afghanistan. It is a social rather than ethnic grouping, although they have some of the characteristics of a distinct ethnic group. They typically reside in southern and eastern Afghanistan but are found throughout the rest of the country as they migrate for nomadic purposes. In the southern, western and northern regions of Afghanistan they are referred to at times as Maldar (Pashto: مالدار "herd-owner") or Powindah (Pashto: پووینده).. In the Pashto language, the terms are Kochai کوچۍ (singular) and Kochian کوچیان (plural).

== Description ==
The National Multi-sectoral Assessment of Kochi in 2004 estimated that there are about 2.4 million Kochis in Afghanistan, with around 1.5 million (60%) remaining fully nomadic; over 100,000 have been displaced due to natural disasters such as flood and drought in the past few years.

The nomads and semi-nomads, generally called Kuchi in Afghanistan, mostly keep sheep and goats. The produce of the animals (meat, dairy products, hair and wool) is exchanged or sold in order to purchase grain, vegetables, fruit and other products of settled life. In this way an extensive network of exchange has developed along the main routes annually followed by the nomads. The merchant Powindah (Barakzai) [or Barakzai] Pashtuns used to move annually from the Afghanistan mountains to the valley of the Indus. These long-distance migrations were stopped in the early 1960s when the border with Afghanistan and Pakistan were closed, but many Kuchis are still allowed to cross as border officials recognize the Kuchi migrations which occur seasonally and allow them to pass even in times of political turmoil. In recent decades, migrations inside Afghanistan continue, although trucks are now often being used to transport livestock and family from one place to another.

== History ==
Kochis historically abstained from politics, because they are nomadic, but under Afghanistan's constitution, they were given ten seats in parliament. Provisions are written into the Afghanistan Constitution (Article 14) aimed at improving the welfare of Kochis, including provisions for housing, representation, and education. According to the United Nations High Commission for Refugees, before the 30 years of war, Kochis owned 30 per cent of the country's goats and sheep and most of the camels for years, and they were largely responsible for the supply of slaughter animals, wool, ghee and quroot to the national economy.

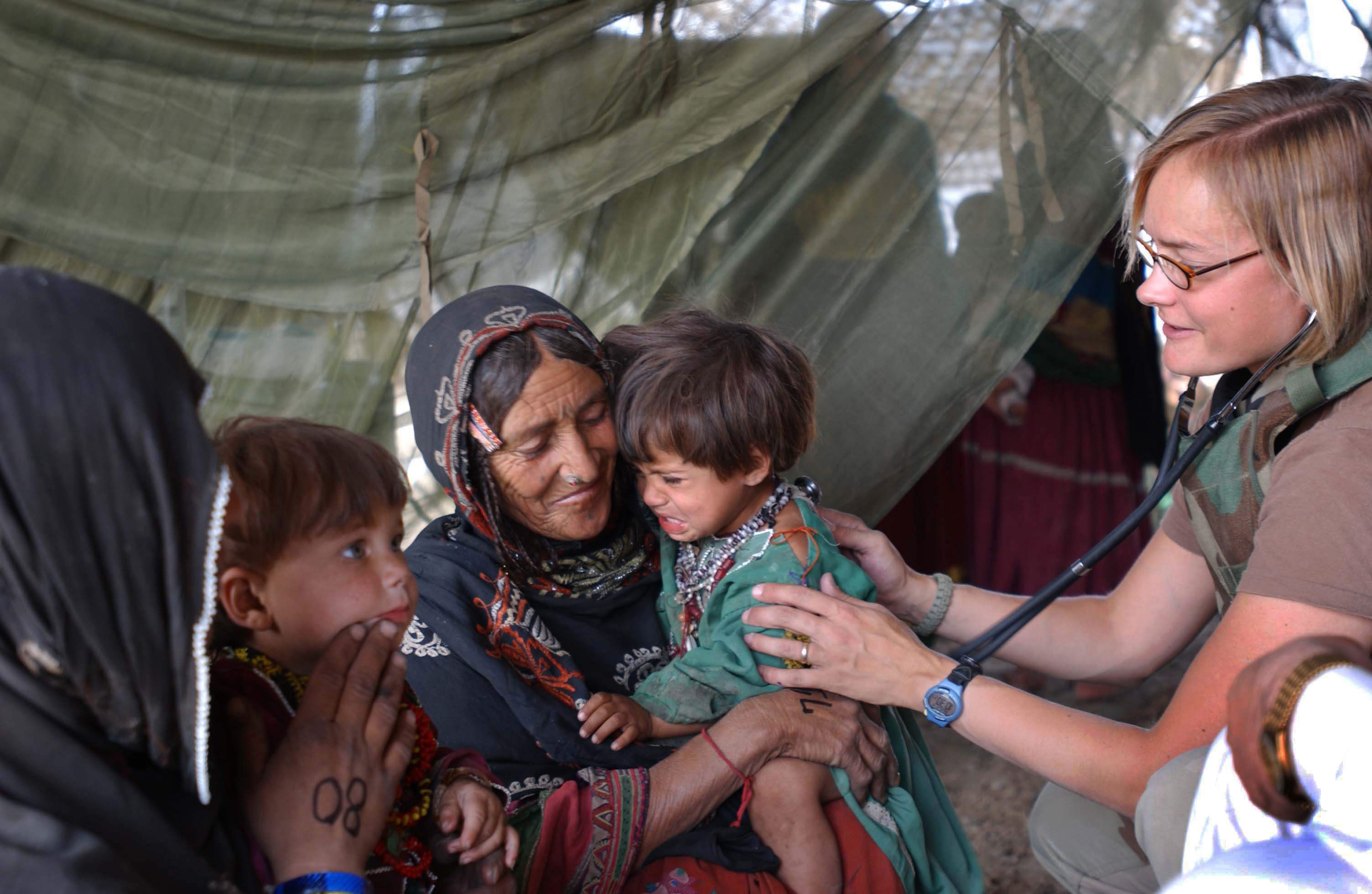
US army medic vaccinating Kochi children, Gardez, 2003.

Kochis were also favored by the Kings of Afghanistan, who were themselves ethnic Pashtuns, since the late 1880s. They were awarded "firman," or royal proclamations, granting them use of summer pastures all over Afghanistan including the northern parts of the country. During the Taliban era, Kochis were a main factor and supporter of the Taliban and their leader Mullah Omar. As a result, the northern ethnic groups (Hazara, Tajiks, Uzbeks and Turkmens) have a long-standing distrust of the Kochi. This political dispute has been deepened over the decades of Kochi transhumance, whereby some Kochis became absentee landlords in their summer areas in the north through customary seizure procedures to attach debtors' land. However, the Kochis themselves see the northern minority groups as a non-Afghan race, and claims the Kochis were natives of northern Afghan region, and that during many years of invasion such as Genghis Khan and Timur, they escaped south.

In 2010 in western Kabul, when Kuchi refugees attempted to resettle on their ancestral lands, they clashed with local Hazara residents. The fighting continued for several days and resulted in casualties among both communities.

Kochis have been identified by the United Nations Assistance Mission in Afghanistan as one of the largest vulnerable populations in the country. As Afghanistan's population grows, competing claims over summer pastures, both for rainfed cultivation and for grazing of the settled communities' livestock, have created conflict over land across central and northern Afghanistan. Paying head-count fees for each animal crossing someone else's property is exacting a harsh economic toll on the Kochi way of life, one that is already having to contend with recurrent droughts that are now occurring with increasing frequency. There are communities of Pashtun Kochi origin in other parts of the world as well, including in the Caribbean, Africa and Europe. In Pakistan, some Kochis are found in Khyber Pakhtunkhwa.

== In popular culture ==
James A. Michener describes Kochi life in his 1963 novel Caravans, set in 1946 Afghanistan.

== Gallery ==
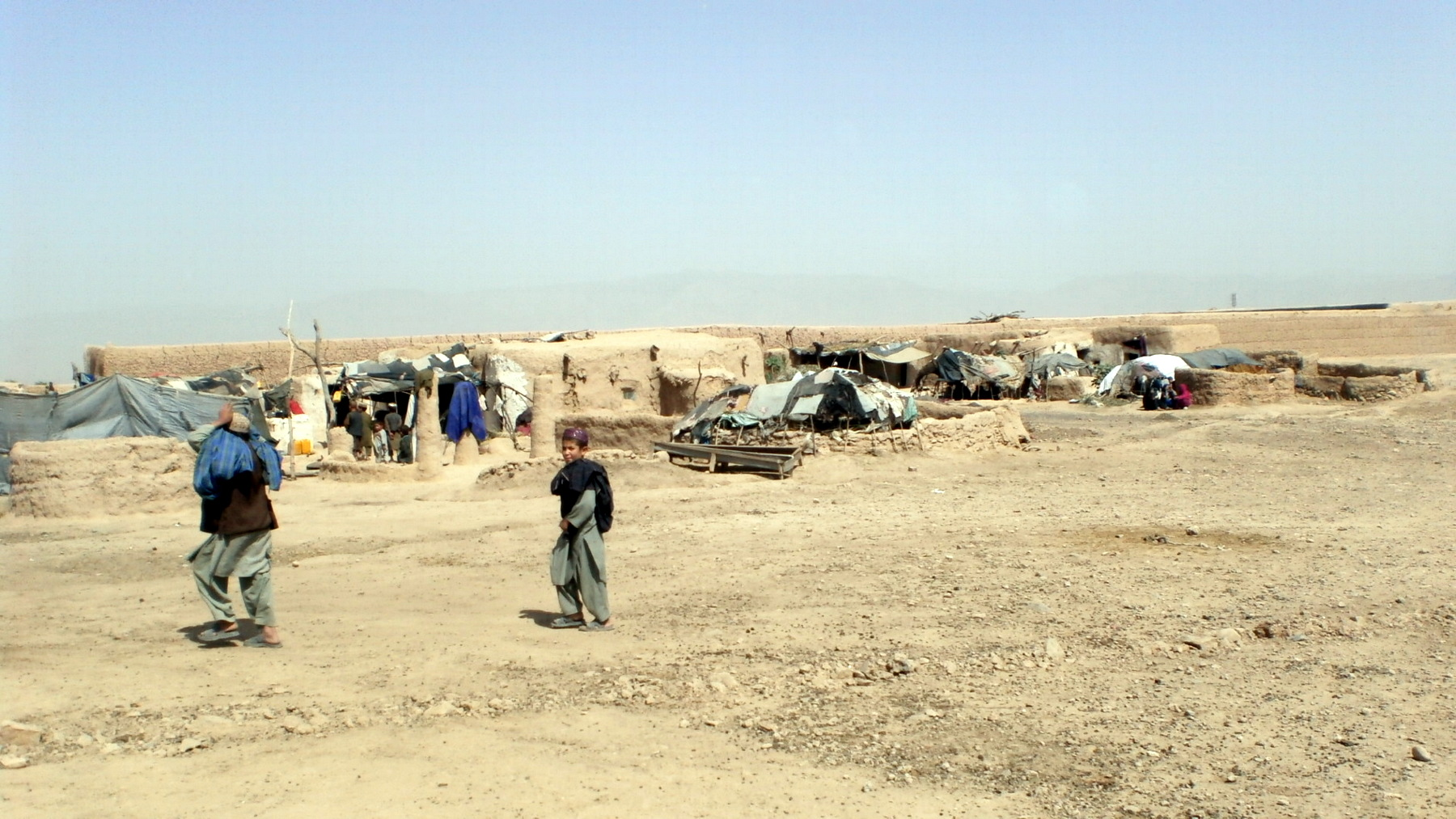
Kochis near Tarinkot, Urozgan Province of Afghanistan

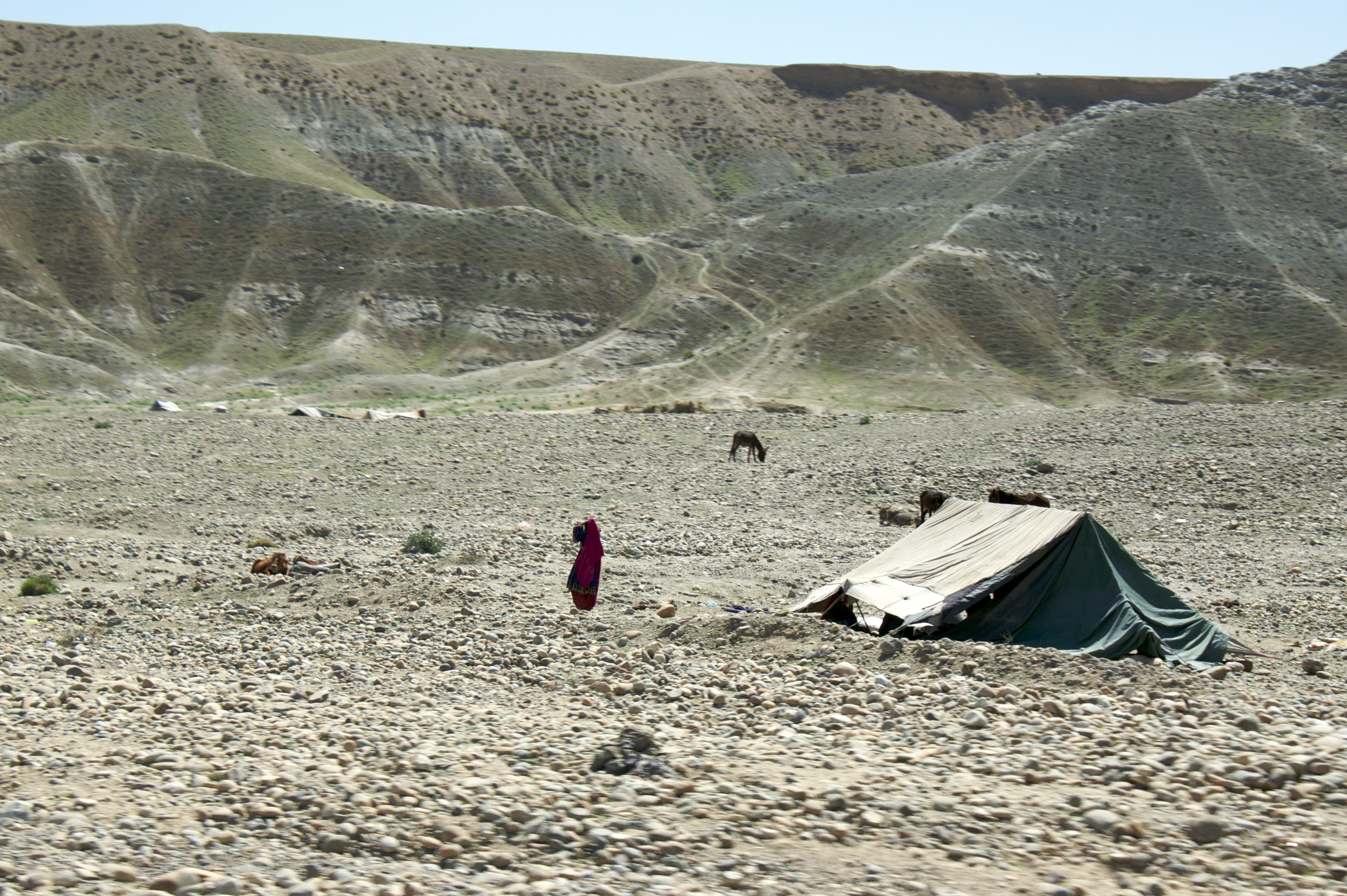
Kochi tent near the Kabul-Jalalabad Road

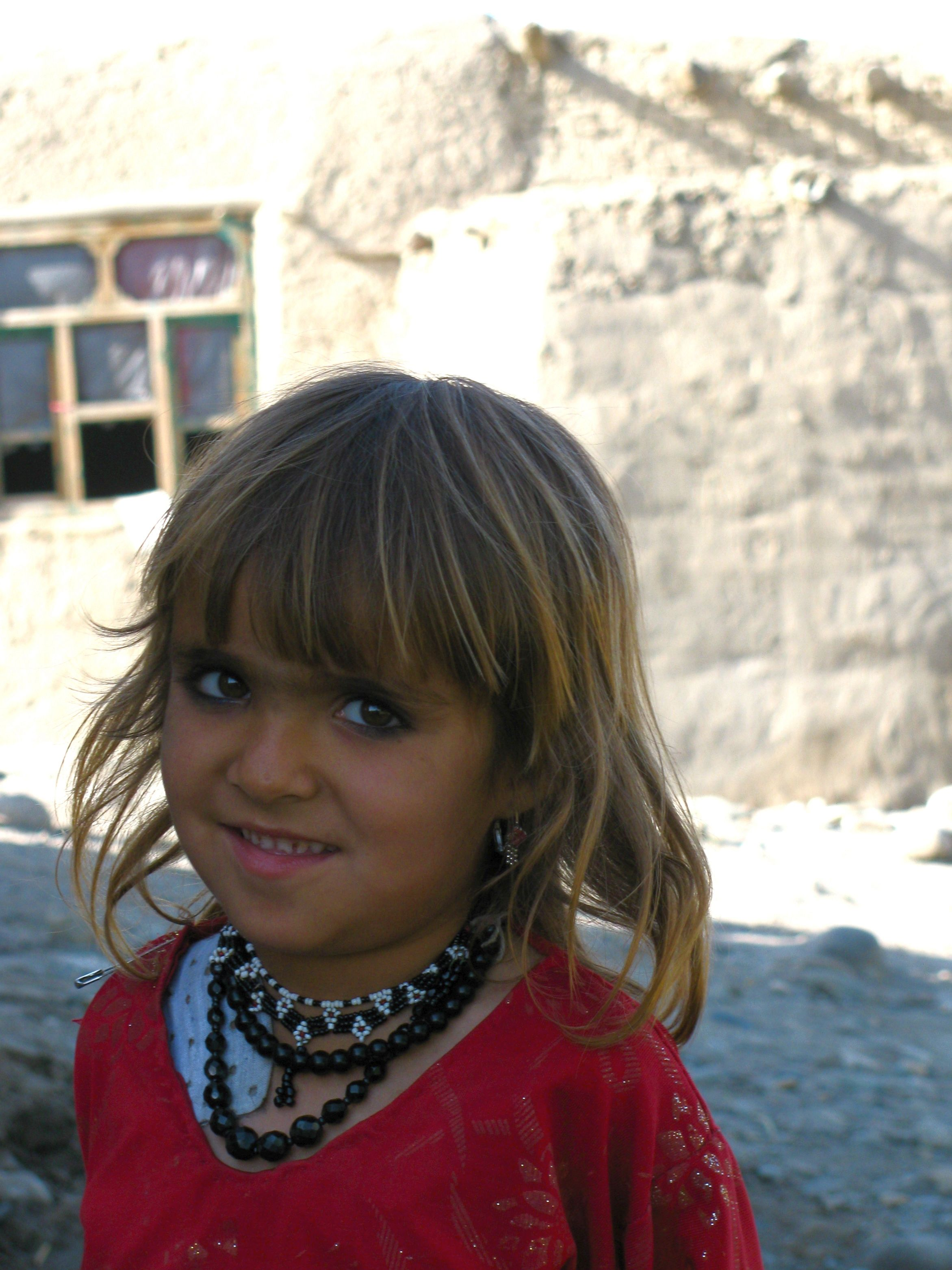
A young Kochi girl
