= Ghulam Farooq Wardak =

Afghan politician (born 1959)

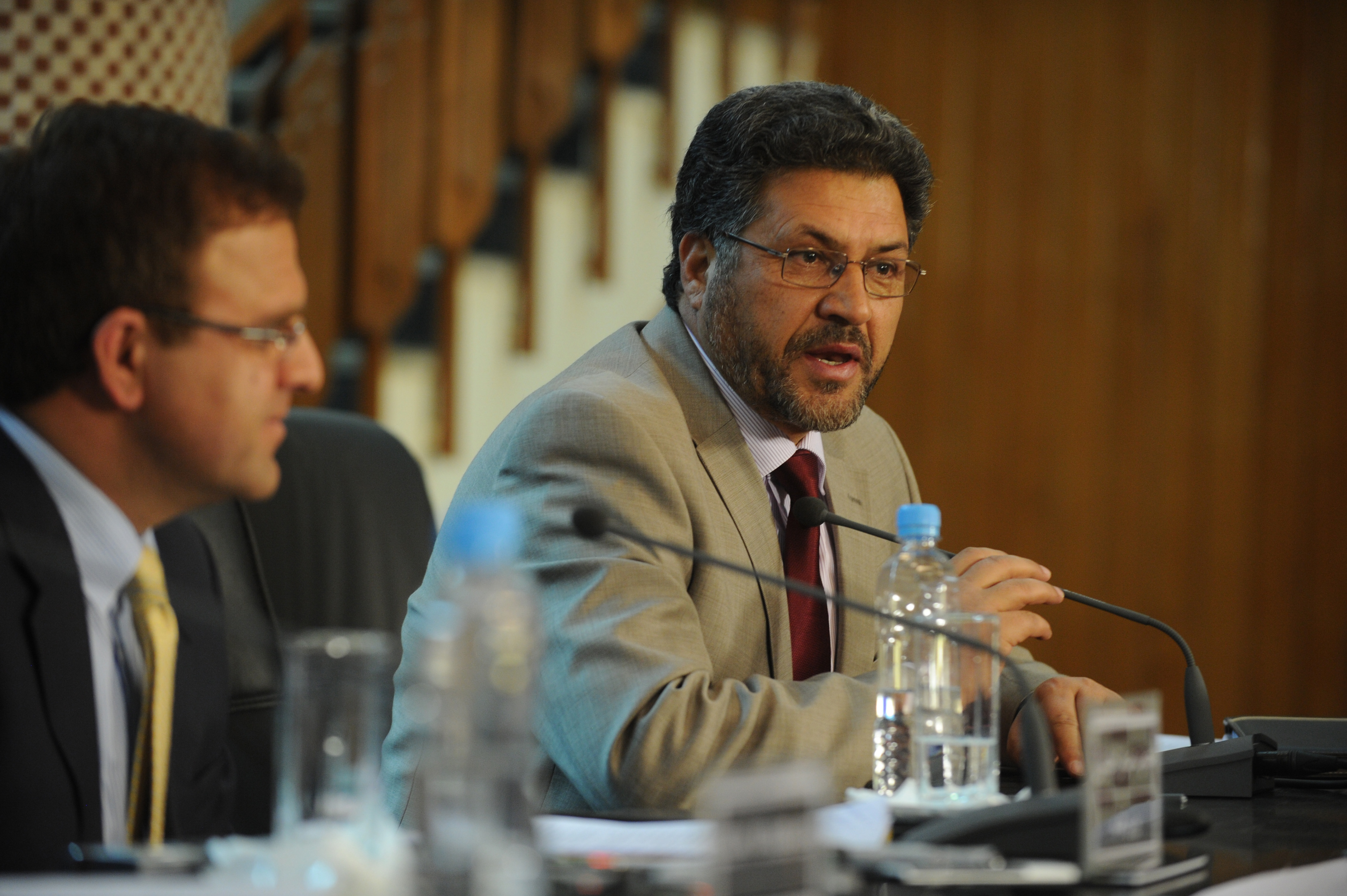
- Wardak in 2011

Minister of Education
- In office 11 October 2008 – April 2015
- Preceded by: Mohammad Hanif Atmar
- Succeeded by: Assadullah Hanif Balkhi

Personal details
- Born: 1959 (age 66–67) Wardak Province, Kingdom of Afghanistan
- Party: Hezbi Islami
- Education: Preston University

Ghulam Farooq Wardak (born 1959) is a politician in Afghanistan, formerly serving as the Minister of Education. He was appointed to that position by Afghan President Hamid Karzai on October 11, 2008. In June 2022, Farooq Wardak was returned to Afghanistan after temporary self-exile following the Taliban takeover of the country in August 2021.

== Early life ==
Farooq Wardak was born in 1959, in the Saydabad Wardak District, in the Wardak Province of Afghanistan. He is an ethnic Pashtun from the Wardak tribe, who is fluent in Pashto, Persian, English and Urdu. His primary education was from a government elementary school in Wardak Province. He completed his high school in Kabul City. With the collapse of President Daud Khan's regime, Wardak joined the jihad against the Democratic Republic of Afghanistan with Hezb-e Islami of Gulbuddin Hekmatyar.

After the end of the first Taliban regime in late 2001, Farooq Wardak has continued to support Hezb-e Islami followers by appointing them to interesting administrative positions.

== Higher education ==
After Soviet invasion of Afghanistan, Wardak stopped his studies in the faculty of Pharmacy of Kabul University and took refuge in Pakistan with the Afghan refugees. In 1982, he was admitted to the Faculty of Pharmacy in Punjab University, and graduated with a degree in 1986. While working with the United Nations from 1996 to 2001 in Pakistan, he received a master's degree in Administration from Preston University, in Peshawar, Pakistan. He received an honorary doctorate from KIIT University in 2012, other recipients at the ceremony were eminent economist, Baidyanath Misra, and Jigme Thinley, the then Prime Minister of Bhutan.

== Work life ==
- 1986 - 1991: He worked with The Swedish Committee for Afghanistan as a health officer.
- 1996 - 2001: United Nations Development program in Peshawar, Pakistan.
- 2002 - 2004: worked as Director of the Constitutional Commission Secretariat and later the Secretariat of the Constitutional Loya Jirga, the grand Assembly that ratified the constitution.
- 2004 - 2005: he was appointed as Director of the Joint Election Management Body's Secretariat (a UN and Afghan Government body), organized the first voter registration process and first ever presidential election.
- 2005: Was appointed as Cabinet Secretary and Director General of Office of Administrative Affairs of the Islamic Republic of Afghanistan.
- 2006: Was appointed as the Minister of State for Parliamentary Affairs.
- 2008: Was appointed as the Minister of Education in Afghanistan.
