= Mawlawi (Islamic title) =

Islamic religious title given to Muslim religious scholars

Mawlawi (Arabic: مولوي, romanized: Mawlawī) is an Islamic religious title given to Muslim religious scholars, or ulama, preceding their names, similar to the titles Mawlānā, Mullah, or Sheikh. Mawlawi generally means a highly qualified Islamic scholar, usually one who has completed full studies in a madrasa (Islamic school) or darul uloom (Islamic seminary). It is commonly used in Iran, Central Asia, South Asia, South East Asia and East Africa. The word Mawlawi is derived from the Arabic word mawla, which has several meanings, including "lord".

Turkish Mawlawi fraternity of Sufis (Muslim mystics) was founded in Konya (Qonya), Anatolia, by the Persian Sufi poet Jalal ad-Din ar-Rumi (d. 1273), whose popular title mawlana (Arabic for "our master") gave the order its name. The order, propagated throughout Anatolia, controlled Konya and environs by the 15th century and in the 17th century appeared in Istanbul.

== Indian subcontinent ==
Although the words Maulvi, Molvi and Maulana are interchangeable in the Indian subcontinent as a title of respect, Maulana is more often associated with formal qualification following study at a madrasa or darul uloom whereas Maulvi is usually more a general title for religious figures.

In the Pakistani and Central Asian context, where Mullah does not carry a formal meaning, "Maulana" or "Maulvi" is often the word of choice for addressing or referring to respected Muslim religious scholars (ulama).

=== Bangladesh ===
In Bangladesh, in the government Aliyah Madrasa system, Maulvi/Moulvi is also associated with formal degrees for those who have passed the course of Maulvi (basic), Maulvi Aalim (intermediate) or Maulvi Fazil (advanced).

== See also ==
- Glossary of Islam
- Hadrat
