= House of the People (Afghanistan) =

Lower house of the former legislature of Afghanistan

House of the People ولسی جرگه Wolesi Jirga

Type
- Type: Lower house of the National Assembly

History
- Founded: 1931
- Disbanded: 15 August 2021

Structure
- Seats: 250
- Length of term: 5 years

Elections
- Voting system: Single non-transferable vote
- First election: 31 October 1931
- Last election: 20 and 27 October 2018

Meeting place
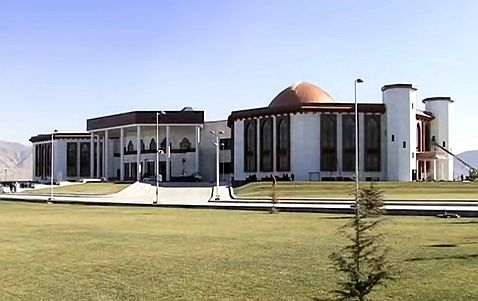
- Kabul

Website
- wj.parliament.af (dead) (16 August 2021 archive)

The House of Representatives of the People, or Da Afghanistan Wolesi Jirga (Pashto: دَ افغانستان ولسي جرګه), was the lower house of the bicameral National Assembly of the Islamic Republic of Afghanistan, alongside the upper House of Elders.

The House of Representatives of the People was the chamber that bore the greater burden of lawmaking in the country, as with the House of Commons in the Westminster model. It consisted of 250 delegates directly elected by single non-transferable vote. Members were elected by district and served for five years. The constitution guaranteed at least 68 delegates to be female. Kuchi nomads elect 10 representatives through a Single National Constituency.

The House of Representatives of the People had the primary responsibility for making and ratifying laws and approving the actions of the president. The first elections in decades were held in September 2005, four years after the fall of the Taliban regime, still under international (mainly UN and NATO) supervision.

The 2010 Wolesi Jirga election was held on 18 September 2010 and the 2018 Wolesi Jirga election was held on 20 October 2018 after almost three years of delay The new Parliament was later inaugurated on 26 April 2019.

It was effectively dissolved when the Taliban seized power on 15 August 2021. The Taliban did not include the House of the People and several other agencies of the former government in its first national budget in May 2022. Government spokesman Innamullah Samangani said that due to the financial crisis, only active agencies were included in the budget, and the excluded ones had been dissolved, but noted they could be brought back "if needed".

== Elections ==
Elections were last held on 20 October 2018. Originally, they had been scheduled for 15 October 2016, but were initially postponed to 7 July 2018, and then again to 20 October. The last Parliament was later sworn in by Afghanistan President Ashraf Ghani on 26 April 2019. The last Parliament was also Afghanistan 17th Parliament. The same day final results from four Afghanistan provinces revealed, among other things, that House of the People former speaker Abdul Rauf Ibrahimi of Kunduz had been re-elected to the House of the People as well.

=== Last election ===
| Party | General seats | | | Kuchi seats | | | Sikh and Hindu seat | | | Total seats | +/– |
| Party | Votes | % | Seats | Votes | % | Seats | Votes | % | Seats | Total seats | +/– |
|---|---|---|---|---|---|---|---|---|---|---|---|
| Independents | 3,409,329 | 100.00 | 233 | 66,476 | 100.00 | 10 | 303 | 100.00 | 1 | 244 | –5 |
| Vacant | | | 6 | | | | | | | 6 | – |
| Total | 3,409,329 | 100.00 | 239 | 66,476 | 100.00 | 10 | 303 | 100.00 | 1 | 250 | +1 |
| Registered voters/turnout | 8,840,306 | – | | | | | | | | | |
Source: IEC, Adam Carr,IPU

== Speakers ==
Speakers of the Wolesi Jirga since establishment of Parliamentary institutions in 1931.

| Name | Entered office | Left office | Notes |
|---|---|---|---|
| Abdul Ahad Wardak | 1931 | 1933 | |
| Abdul Ahad Wardak | 1934 | 1936 | |
| Abdul Ahad Wardak | 1937 | 1939 | |
| Abdul Ahad Wardak | 1940 | 1942 | |
| Abdul Ahad Wardak | 1943 | 1945 | |
| Sultan Ahmad Khan | 1946 | 1948 | |
| Abdul Hadi Dawi | 1949 | 1951 | |
| Abdul Rasheed Khan | 1952 | 1954 | |
| Mohammad Nawroz Khan | 1955 | 1957 | |
| Mohammad Nawroz Khan | 1958 | 1960 | |
| Abdul Zahir | 1961 | 1964 | |
| Abdul Zahir | 1965 | 1968 | |
| Mohammad Omer Wardak | 1969 | 1972 | |
| Dissolved | 1973 | 1988 | |
| Khalil Abawi | 1988 | 1992 | |
| Not functioning | 1992 | 2005 | |
| Yunus Qanuni | 2005 | 2010 | |
| Abdul Rauf Ibrahimi | 2011 | 2019 | |
| Mir Rahman Rahmani | 2019 | 2021 | |

== See also ==
- National Assembly of Afghanistan
- House of Elders
- Politics of Afghanistan
- List of legislatures by country
