= Karzai (surname) =

Karzai (Pashto: کرزی, romanized: Karzay; pronounced [ˈkɑrzɑːj]) (sometimes Karazai) is an Afghan surname. Karzai means the person is from the village of Karz in the Kandahar Province of southeastern Afghanistan and is assembled through the common construction of adding an Arabic letter "Ya" to the proper noun Karz which is a village. Karzai is pronounced Karzay because of the dialect of Kandahar, while others may pronounce it as Karzi. Notable people with the surname include:

- Abdul Ahad Karzai, Afghan politician
- Ahmed Wali Karzai, Afghan politician
- Azizullah Karzai, Afghan diplomat
- Habibullah Karzai, tribal leader
- Hamid Karzai, President of Afghanistan (2001–2015)
- Hashmat Karzai, cousin of President Hamid Karzai, businessman in security and construction, killed by a suicide bomber in July 2014.
- Jamil Karzai, Afghan politician
- Mahmood Karzai, businessman, elder brother of President Hamid Karzai.
- Qayum Karzai, politician, elder brother of President Hamid Karzai.
- Yar Mohammed Karzai, relative of Afghan President Hamid Karzai, accidentally killed in a US raid in Afghanistan 2011.
