= Donald L. Ritter =

American politician

Don Ritter
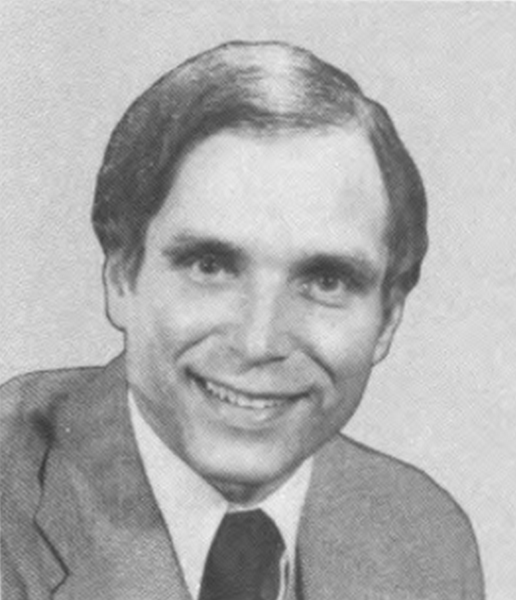
- Ritter in 1983

Member of the U.S. House of Representatives from Pennsylvania's 15th district
- In office January 3, 1979 – January 3, 1993
- Preceded by: Fred B. Rooney
- Succeeded by: Paul McHale

Personal details
- Born: Donald Lawrence Ritter; October 21, 1940 (age 85) New York City, New York, U.S.
- Party: Republican
- Education: Lehigh University (BS); Massachusetts Institute of Technology (MS, DSc)

Donald Lawrence Ritter (born October 21, 1940) is a former Republican member of the U.S. House of Representatives from Pennsylvania. From 1979 to 1993, Ritter represented Pennsylvania's 15th congressional district, which then included the Lehigh Valley region of the state.

== Early life and education ==
Ritter was born in Washington Heights in New York City, the son of Frank and Ruth Ritter. Ritter's father was born in Hungary and lived in Manhattan and later The Bronx. Ritter attended New York City's P.S. 70 Elementary School, the Joseph H. Wade Junior High School, P.S. 117, and the Bronx High School of Science.

Ritter then attended Lehigh University in Bethlehem, Pennsylvania, where he graduated with a B.S. in metallurgical engineering in 1961. He went on to receive an M.S. from MIT in Cambridge, Massachusetts, in 1963 and an Sc.D. in physical metallurgy from MIT in 1966. He worked as a research assistant at MIT while obtaining his doctorate from 1961 to 1966.

== Academic and private work ==
From 1967 to 1968, Ritter was a National Academy of Sciences scientific exchange fellow at the Baikov Institute of Metallurgy and Materials Science at the Academy of Sciences of the Soviet Union in Moscow, which was then the Soviet Union's highest scientific institution. The Academy of Science's president Mstislav Keldysh was an engineer in the Soviet space program and a member of the Central Committee of the Communist Party of the Soviet Union and the Supreme Soviet of the Soviet Union.

In 1968, Ritter returned to the U.S., where he became an assistant professor at Cal Poly and a contract consultant for General Dynamics in Pomona, California.

In 1969, he returned to Lehigh University in Bethlehem, Pennsylvania, as a metallurgy faculty member and the university's assistant to the vice president. In 1976, he was appointed manager of Lehigh University's research program development, serving in this capacity and as an engineering consultant to private industry until 1979.

== U.S. House of Representatives ==
In 1979, Ritter announced his candidacy for Congress in the Pennsylvania's 15th congressional district. Ritter prevailed in a five-way primary for the Republican nomination, and then went on to upset 16-year incumbent Democrat Fred B. Rooney to represent Pennsylvania's 15th Congressional District in the 96th United States Congress and in six consecutive Congresses, holding the seat for seven terms, or 14 years.

Ritter represented the Lehigh Valley region of eastern Pennsylvania, which includes the cities of Allentown, Bethlehem, and Easton, and has hybrid economy of both heavy manufacturing companies and employees and a substantial university and college constituency.

=== U.S. House Committees ===
In the U.S. House of Representatives, Ritter rose to become a senior member of two influential committees, the Committee on Energy and Commerce and the Committee on Science and Technology. On both committees and in his legislative initiatives and voting record, Ritter led an effort to bring a greater scientific approach to the politicized debate over environmental and energy regulation. He was often referred to by peers as the "scientist-congressman" because he was one of the few Ph.D. or Sc.D.-level scientists in history to serve in the United States Congress.

=== Trade policies ===
Ritter supported free markets and small government policies, though he also cast several trade votes in favor of his district's steel and apparel industries, both of which were then beginning to lose global market share to mostly Asia-based foreign competitors who were benefiting from government subsidies, limited regulatory constraints, low wages, and other practices. At the same time, Ritter supported the North American Free Trade Agreement, which was debated and passed the House in 1993.

=== Risk assessment and total quality management advocacy ===
Ritter was the leading advocate in Congress for utilizing risk assessment to put hazards, particularly energy and environmental ones, in more rational perspective that he believed better prioritized and reduced the risks that represented the most dangerous threats to public health and the environment. Ritter's risk assessment legislation was ultimately incorporated in the Contract with America in 1994 and passed into law the following year, in 1995.

While in Congress, Ritter championed the use of total quality management in public policy development and management. As part of this effort, he made progress in building bridges between the U.S. Congress and some of the world's leading global total quality management thought leaders, including W. Edwards Deming, Joseph M. Juran, Armand V. Feigenbaum, and others. In his Lehigh Valley district, he launched Quality Valley USA, which advocated the use of total quality management practices and enhanced public awareness of the economic advantages that its implementation represented for citizens, businesses, and workers.

=== Lehigh River ===
In his eastern Pennsylvania district, Ritter promoted the Lehigh River as a linear environmental center to the Lehigh Valley that was central to the leisure, recreation, and creative economic development needs of his constituents. Later, along with neighboring Pennsylvania Congressman Peter H. Kostmayer, Ritter authored legislation that created the Delaware and Lehigh National Heritage Corridor, which has since become a primary environmental and recreational focus in the Lehigh Valley.

=== Anti-communism and human rights ===
Ritter was a champion of human rights and opposed what he saw as the Soviet Union's expansionist activity in Afghanistan, Cuba, Central America, Eastern Europe, and elsewhere. In addition to his service on the Commission on Security and Cooperation in Europe, Ritter was the founding chairman of the Ad Hoc Committee on the Baltic States and Ukraine whose co-chairmen were Dennis Hertel (D-MI) and U.S. Senator Donald Riegle (D-MI). At the Washington Monument in 1983, Ritter addressed a memorial rally in support of millions of Ukrainians who were killed in the forced starvation employed by Josef Stalin in the man-made famine of the Holodomor in the early 1930s.

Ritter speaks fluent Russian and studied Russian literature, culture, and history as a hobby at MIT. He was introduced to Russian language study by Alexander Isaacovich Lipson, a professor at Harvard and MIT at the time.

Ritter was a leader in Congress in opposition to the Soviet invasion of Afghanistan in 1979. He spent the next decade in Congress working with Afghans to evict the Soviet invaders. He authored the "Material Assistance to Afghanistan" legislation, also known as Ritter-Tsongas, in 1982, created the Congressional Task Force on Afghanistan (Ritter-Humphrey) to promote "material assistance" of all kinds to the Afghan resistance, convened meetings on Afghanistan with representatives of the U.S. Department of State, Defense Intelligence Agency, Central Intelligence Agency, and Federal Bureau of Investigation to enhance U.S. assistance to the Afghan resistance, and used his ranking position on the Commission on Security and Cooperation in Europe to expand the commission's focus from Eastern Europe and the Soviet Union to also address the Soviets' illegal invasion, occupation, and destruction of Afghanistan, which violated the Soviet-signed Helsinki Accords.

=== Congressional voting record ===
Ritter enjoyed consistently high rankings from conservative interest groups and correspondingly low rankings from liberal ones. While his eastern Pennsylvania district was ancestrally Democratic, it also had a considerable tinge of social conservatism and a significant number of Hungarian, Polish, Slovak, and Ukrainian Americans who supported Ritter's strong anti-communism. Partly due to this, after his initial run for Congress in 1979, he was reelected six more times without serious difficulty. Even in 1982 and 1986, which were bad years for Republicans nationally, Ritter was reelected with 57 percent and 56 percent of the vote, respectively.

In 1992, with Ross Perot running as an Independent and George H. W. Bush only securing 36% of the vote in his failed presidential reelection bid, Ritter lost what would have been his seventh reelection in a close race against Democrat State Representative Paul McHale.

== Post-Congressional career ==
=== National Environmental Policy Institute ===
From 1993 to 2002, Ritter served as founder, chairman, and president of the National Environmental Policy Institute (NEPI), which sought greater involvement of states and localities in environmental policy development, which had been largely controlled at the federal level. Ritter developed and engaged grassroots involvement in support of moving some environmental policies in a more fact and science-based direction, as opposed to a Washington, D.C.–based politicized one. In support of this, NEPI engaged citizens and decision-makers from states, cities, and localities.

NEPI conducted working groups of some 40 to 50 individuals on various environmental policies and proposals, including reinventing the EPA and environmental policy being proposed by then Vice President Al Gore's Reinventing Government initiative.

NEPI's initiatives sought expanded involvement of the scientific community and bipartisan representation from states and localities, which had traditionally been excluded from the development of federal environmental policies. NEPI and its collaborating institutions and participants issued an extensive number of publications. The organization's working groups and annual conferences, held in Washington, D.C., drew some 250-300 participants, including governors, mayors, state legislators, chairpersons of various Congressional Committees, Cabinet members, EPA administrators, White House officials, environmental advocacy group leaders, and leading legal and scientific figures. NEPI also conducted several working groups on the policy implications of several highly technical issues, including bioavailability and sediments.

=== Afghanistan ===
While heading NEPI, Ritter also founded the Afghanistan Foundation in Washington, D.C., which he chaired. The Afghanistan Foundation was the only major organization paying attention to many of the concerning warning signs that were emerging in Afghanistan in the late 1990s, which led ultimately to the September 11 attacks.

Ritter also focused on fostering a market economy in Afghanistan, both as a businessman and investor. He co-founded the Afghan-American Chamber of Commerce (AACC) and the USAID-supported Afghan International Chamber of Commerce (AICC), which later became the Afghanistan Chamber of Commerce and Industries. Ritter worked with Mahmud Karzai and also with Hamid Karzai (brother of former Afghan president Hamid Karzai), Ahmed Wali Karzai (who was assassinated in 2011), and Qayum Karzai, the elder brother of the former president, with whom he jointly authored several opinion editorials in The Washington Times.

== Personal life ==
Ritter was a resident of Coopersburg, Pennsylvania, in the Lehigh Valley for 25 years, prior to his divorce from his former wife Edith Duerksen Ritter, previously of Canada, with whom he has two children, a son, Jason Alexei, and a daughter, Kristina Larissa.

Ritter resides in Washington, D.C., and Warrenton, Virginia, with his partner Victoria Stack.

U.S. House of Representatives
Preceded by Fred B. Rooney	Member of the U.S. House of Representatives from Pennsylvania's 15th congressional district 1979–1993	Succeeded by Paul McHale
U.S. order of precedence (ceremonial)
Preceded by Doug Walgren as Former U.S. Representative	Order of precedence of the United States as Former U.S. Representative	Succeeded by Phil English as Former U.S. Representative
