= Abdul Ahad Karzai =

Politician in Afghanistan and tribal leader of the Popalzais

Abdul Ahad Karzai (Pashto: عبدالاحد کرزی) (1922 – 14 July 1999) was an Afghan politician, who served as the Deputy Speaker of the National Assembly of Afghanistan under King Zahir Shah in the 1960s. He was the son of Khair Mohammad Khan and brother of Habibullah and Azizullah Karzai. His sons are the former Afghan President Hamid Karzai and Ahmed Wali, Mahmud and Qayum. He is also the uncle of Hekmat Karzai.

As head of the Popalzai Pashtun tribe, Abdul Ahad Karzai moved with his family from Kandahar to the capital Kabul upon his election to the Parliament. He began criticizing the Democratic Republic of Afghanistan and was imprisoned for three years, at which point his family's properties were confiscated.

On 14 July 1999, when the Taliban government was in power, Abdul Ahad Karzai was assassinated by two suspected Taliban members outside the house of his relatives in Quetta, Pakistan. He was coming home from a mosque after completing his morning prayer. The two murderers were riding on a motorcycle and had fled the scene after accomplishing their crime. This early morning assassination by men on motorcycle is a common thing in the region. The bullets not only killed Karzai but also his relative Baz, who is said to have come from one of the wealthy families in Afghanistan. Hamid Karzai was at their house eating breakfast when they both lost their life. Abdul Ahad was between 75 and 77 years old when he died. His son Hamid Karzai took over the leadership and responsibilities of the Popalzai tribe. Hamid Karzai and his father were living as Afghan refugees in Quetta.

== See also ==
- Karzai
