= Hashmat Karzai =

Afghan-American businessman and political advisor

Hashmat Khan Karzai
- Born: Afghanistan
- Died: July 29, 2014; Karz, Afghanistan
- Cause of death: Suicide bombing
- Occupations: Businessman, political advisor
- Children: Safiullah Karzai (son) 3 daughters
- Parent: Khalil Karzai
- Relatives: Hamid Karzai (cousin)

Hashmat Khan Karzai (died 29 July 2014) was an Afghan-American businessman and political advisor.

== Biography ==
Hashmat Khalil Karzai was born in Afghanistan. He was a cousin of Afghan President Hamid Karzai. Karzai ran security and construction companies in Afghanistan. He was a powerbroker in the Kandahar Province and was seen as a tribal leader of the Popalzai, a Pashtun tribe. He was a supporter of presidential candidate Ashraf Ghani. Some sources go as far as to call him his "campaign manager." Additionally, he held an American passport.

=== Personal life ===
Karzai had a pet lion and smoked cigars. He was called by many in Kandahar as the "Lion of Kandahar".

=== Death ===
Hashmat Karzai was killed by a suicide bomber at his private residence in Karz near Kandahar on July 29, 2014.
