= Yar Mohammed =

Yar Mohammed may refer to:

- Yar Mohammed (Karzai), second cousin of Afghan President Hamid Karzai, killed in a botched night raid
- Yar Mohammed (Zabul), police chief in Zabul Province, killed in an ambush in 2004 in Afghanistan
- Yar Mohammad (Kabul), sat on Committee Eight of the Constitutional Loya Jirga
- Yar Mohammad (Parwan), sat on Committee Eight of the Constitutional Loya Jirga
- Yar Muhammad, Pakistani jurist
- Yar Mohammad Khan, Bangladeshi politician
