= Yar Mohammed (Karzai) =

Haji Yar Mohammed
- Born: 1946; Kandahar
- Died: 2011 age 65-66
- Known for: killed during a raid by US special forces

Haji Yar Mohammed was a second cousin of Afghan President Hamid Karzai who was killed during a night raid by United States special forces on March 10, 2011. He is from Karz, the same village as the President.

His killing came shortly after Karzai had demanded the US stop using the technique of night raids due to the unacceptable level of deaths of innocent civilians.

NATO spokesman initially claimed the dead man was the father of a suspected of being a Taliban leader, shot because he was holding an AK47. Later NATO spokesmen were to acknowledge confusion, and having multiple incompatible reports of what happened. was accidentally killed.

According to Jon Boone, writing in The Guardian, another of Preside Karzai's brothers, Mahmoud Karzai had speculated that the failed raid had been due to a false denunciation from disgruntled elements of the President's own clan. Mahmoud Karzai said that Yar Mohammed Karzai had killed a cousin thirty years earlier, during the time of the Soviet occupation of Afghanistan, and he was concerned that man's relatives were angry enough to employ a false denunciation to credulous American intelligence officials in order to get even. He said Yar Mohammed's son Waheed had been shot, as part of the feud, in October 2009.

Both NATO and President Karzai's office said they would initiate inquiries into what really happened.
