= Habibullah Karzai =

Afghan politician

Habibullah Khan Karzai was an Afghan leader from the Popalzai clan. He was an elder and considered a leader of the Karzai family. His younger brother, Abdul Ahad Karzai, was the father of President Hamid Karzai.

Habibullah Khan Karzai served as special advisor and speechwriter to King Zahir Shah and accompanied him in the course of the King's state visit to the United States during the presidency of John F. Kennedy. He has also served as senior envoy from the Afghan Foreign Ministry and Permanent Representative from Afghanistan to the United Nations. Habibullah Karzai is regarded by many Afghans as a very learned scholar of philosophy and politics.

His tenure in Government ended after the Soviet takeover of Afghanistan forcing him to step away from politics. He began an effort to arm the local Afghan villages again the Soviet invasion. Beyond that he appeared in many journal to comment on the reversion to tribal practices in the time of conflict. He provided context for the democratic and social backsliding that was taking place in real time in the 1980s as a result of the years of conflict.
