= Hekmat Karzai =

Afghan politician

Hekmat Khalil Karzai
- Born: Kandahar
- Occupation: Deputy Foreign Minister of Afghanistan
- Known for: Political leadership

Hekmat Khalil Karzai (Pashto: حکمت خلیل کرزی) is an Afghan political figure. He served as the deputy foreign minister of Afghanistan from his appointment on 21 January 2015 until his resignation on 17 October 2018.

He has provided consultations and guest lectures to international bodies regarding Afghanistan.

== Early life ==
Karzai was born in 1973 in the Kandahar Province to Khalil Lula Karzai and Shaheed Khalil Khan. He has a brother named Shaheed Hashmat Khan. He spent several years living in Quetta, Pakistan, during the Afghan-Soviet War. He studied at a British school in Quetta, then went on to attend college in the United States. Karzai is fluent in Pashto, Dari, English, and Urdu.

Karzai has a Bachelor of Arts in political science from University of Maryland, United States of America; Master of Science in information technology from American University, United States of America and Master of Science in strategic studies from Institute of Defense and Strategic Studies, Singapore.

While working on a master's degree at the S. Rajaratnam School of International Studies in Singapore, he served as a RMS Fellow at the school's International Centre for Political Violence and Terrorism Research in Singapore, where his primary focus was the South and Central Asia regions. He also conducted research in development, security and conflict resolution.

Karzai is the cousin of former President Hamid Karzai. He is a dual citizen of Afghanistan and America.

== Career ==
In May 2002, Karzai was appointed as the head of the Political Department at the Embassy of Afghanistan in Washington, D.C. His duties included overseeing political and congressional affairs, serving as a direct link to the diplomatic and political community to liaise with US Congress and Executive Branch on policies, security, funding and other vital issues pertaining to Afghanistan.

From 2004 till 2005, he served as an international fellow at the Edmund Walsh School of Foreign Service at Georgetown University where he conducted research on terrorism, violent extremism, the Soviet invasion of Afghanistan and the Al-Qaeda movement.

He was the Founding Director of the Afghanistan's Centre for Conflict and Peace Studies (CAPS), one of the leading research and advocacy centers in Afghanistan. During his time there, CAPS provided pro-bono legal assistance to thousands of security detainees throughout the country and established the Strategic Shura, which is an informal channel that helps in peace negotiations.

Karzai was appointed as the Deputy Minister of Foreign Affairs in 2015. At the ministry, he chaired several national and international forums including Heart of Asia- Istanbul Process, Regional Economic Cooperation Conference for Afghanistan (RECCA), and International Contact Group (ICG) amongst others. He led the Afghan delegations in the first face-to-face talks with the Taliban in July 2015 and at the Quadrilateral Coordination Group (Afghanistan, Pakistan, China and United States) meetings with a focus on creating an enabling environment for the Afghan peace process.

He resigned from the Ministry of Foreign Affairs in 2018 due to "deep differences" with the Ghani administration. In a statement, he claimed that security had worsened under Ghani, and that the president had "alienated and sidelined" many senior political officials in Afghanistan.

Karzai has consulted a number of international bodies regarding Afghanistan and has guest lectured on security and state building. He has continued to work in peace talks since his departure from the Ministry.

== Published works ==
- How to Curb the Rising Suicide Terrorism in Afghanistan, (2006)
- Strengthening Security in Contemporary Afghanistan: Coping with the Taliban, (2007)
- Trust Building and Paving the Road for Reconciliation, (2009)
