= Kandahar Provincial Council =

Kandahar Provincial Council is a Shura for Kandahar Province, Afghanistan.

Following the assassination of Provincial Council Chair Ahmed Wali Karzai in July 2011, former Deputy Chair Mohammad Ehsan Noorzai is acting chair.
