= Qayum Karzai =

Afghan politician (1947–2024)

Abdul Qayyum Karzai
- قيوم کرزی
- Born: 1947; Kandahar, Afghanistan
- Died: 29 May 2024 (aged 77); Columbia, Maryland, U.S.

Abdul Qayum Karzai (Pashto: قيوم کرزی; 1947 – 29 May 2024) was an Afghan politician and businessman. He was the elder brother of former President Hamid Karzai. His brothers also include Mahmoud Karzai and the assassinated Ahmed Wali Karzai. Abdul Qayum was a businessman in the United States before entering into Afghan politics. He served as a member of the Wolesi Jirga, the lower house of the National Assembly of Afghanistan. He retired for health reasons and had "reportedly been involved in backchannel peace diplomacy with the Taliban through Saudi Arabia."

It was reported in June 2012 that he planned to run in the 2014 Afghan presidential election. His brother, Mahmoud Karzai was promoting Qayum Karzai for President as Hamid Karzai prepared his departure from office in 2014.

Under pressure from his brother Hamid Karzai, Qayum decided to quit the race in March 2014 and endorse Zalmai Rassoul.

== Early life and education ==
Born in Kandahar in 1947, He was the son of Abdul Ahad Karzai and an elder brother of Afghan President Hamid Karzai. His other brothers were Mahmoud Karzai, Ahmed Wali Karzai who was assassinated by his bodyguard, and Shah Wali Karzai. He also had one sister, named Fauzia Karzai. According to a report by the Navy Postgraduate School, the Karzai family is from the Popolzai tribe of the Pashtun ethnic group. The report states that Qayum had a Masters degree in Political Science from American University in Washington, D.C. and owned three restaurants in Baltimore.

== Death ==
Karzai's death in Maryland was reported on 30 May 2024.

== Career ==
In 2002, Afghan President Hamid Karzai appointed Qayum Karzai as a delegate to the Constitutional Loya Jirga. He sat on the second of the Loya Jirga's ten committees, chaired by Abdul Rasul Sayyaf.

Many Afghans were critical of Qayum Karzai, for various reasons, including his very close connections to his controversial brothers Mahmoud Karzai and assassinated Ahmed Wali Karzai, and for his poor attendance in parliament. In 2008, the speaker of the parliament, Yunus Qanuni, began publishing the regular attendance tallies, and this put added pressure on Karzai to respond. In October 2008, Qayum Karzai gave up his seat in the parliament, citing health problems as the reason he missed so many parliamentary sessions.

Qayum Karzai was also reportedly involved in secret meetings to work out some sort of peace agreement with the former Taliban government. He traveled to Saudi Arabia to enlist their help in bringing the Taliban to the negotiating table, and ending the Taliban insurgency against the Afghan government.

Karzai intended to run for president in the 2014 presidential election to succeed his brother, despite not having Hamid's support. However, he dropped out of the race in early March 2014, endorsing Zalmai Rassoul.

=== United States ===
Qayum Karzai's first restaurant was in Chicago. He owned three restaurants in Baltimore: the Helmand (an Afghan restaurant), Tapas Teatro, and Helmand Kabobi. Qayum's brother Mahmood Karzai owns The Helmand restaurant in Cambridge, Massachusetts.

=== Allegations regarding business dealings ===
Independent investigative journalists, Afghan businessmen, and others have alleged that Qayum Karzai used questionable and heavy-handed methods in Afghanistan, especially in dealing with business rivals. Some have brought forth serious ethics charges and alleged organized effort to control the news media in parts of Afghanistan and to intimidate business rivals, allegedly driving some out of Afghanistan. In 2012, shocking revelations were exposed in several major news stories where fellow Afghan associates of Qayum Karzai brought forth serious allegations about various controversial business dealings.

Naseem Pashtoon Sharifi, a businessman, and major independent newspaper, media and advertising company owner, in Kandahar is reported to have been driven out of Afghanistan by these methods and went public with major and detailed accusations against Qayum Karzai and his associates. Sharifi reportedly fled Afghanistan out of fear of President Karzai's brother and has detailed information about Qayum Karzai's alleged business dealings in Afghanistan that he says caused him to flee for his life and abandon major business ventures, property and investments in Afghanistan.

According to a December 2010 report in the Toronto Star, "But further investigation shows Sharifi’s story is far from one man’s grudge. Four other Kandahar sources, speaking to The Star on condition of anonymity, confirmed his account that Karzai muscle-flexing removed him from the city, with Karzai interests promptly taking over the bulk of his business."

Journalists from the Toronto Star, The Washington Times, Washington Examiner, the Boiling Frog Post and others raised concerns and undertook investigative reporting about these matters.

According to journalist Michael Hughes of the Washington Examiner (18 April 2012) and Salem News: "Qayum's control of the media has reduced southern Afghanistan to a de facto totalitarian state. This doesn't seem to bother NATO a bit considering it finances Qayum-owned media outlets which, incidentally, never seem to report anything negative about the Karzai regime...."

According to investigate research, and an editorial in The Washington Times (21 May 2012) entitled "Afghanistan’s corruption breeds failure: Successful withdrawal requires tougher action against official thievery," by Malou Innocent and Danny Marku: "But Qayum Karzai is not the only Karzai involved in such strong-arm tactics against his business rivals. Hamid Karzai’s younger half-brother, the late Ahmed Wali Karzai, once consolidated his power by acting as both the powerful chairman of Kandahar’s provincial council and by relying on a mafialike network of militias that made millions of dollars by bribing security companies that benefited from contracts escorting NATO convoys."

Sibel Edmonds researched and wrote about controversies surrounding Qayum Karzai's, Ahmed Wali Karzai's and Mahmoud Karzai's various business dealings in Afghanistan. The National Security Whistleblowers Coalition also raised concerns.

== Personal life and death ==
Karzai later resided in Columbia, Maryland, where he died on 29 May 2024, at age 77.

== See also ==
- Corruption in Afghanistan
- Special Inspector General for Afghanistan Reconstruction
