= Naim Popal =

Afghan singer, songwriter, and composer (born 1954)

نعیم پوپل Naim Popal
- Born: 18 June 1954 (age 71); Kabul, Afghanistan
- Genres: Pop, dance, ghazal
- Occupation(s): Singer, songwriter, composer
- Instrument(s): Vocals, piano, harmonium, tabla
- Years active: 1972–present

Naim Popal (Pashto/Dari: نعیم پوپل) (born 18 June 1954) is an Afghan singer, songwriter, and composer.

In 2006, Popal returned to perform for a New Year concert in Afghanistan after 30 years in exile.

== Biography ==
Naim Popal was born on 18 June 1954, into a Popalzai family, in the Demazang district in Kabul, Afghanistan. His father, Sayed Ahmad, worked at the Ministry of Energy while his mother, Rabia, took care of home duties. He is the middle child amongst five brothers and four sisters. His passion for music began at the age of nine, where he began singing and playing harmonium for his friends and classmates. His sister in law supported him at the time a lot to make his music career. He attended the high schools of Habibiya and Shahey Du Shamshera. At Shahey Du Shamshera, he started a band called "Lalaha" (The Tulips). The name originated from a 1963 French film starring Alain Delon, whom Naim had greatly admired in his youth. The band consisted of Samey Khaluqi on drums, Nazer Baluch on bass guitar, Waqil Rawoufi on lead guitar, while Naim served as the vocalist and keyboardist. The band gained fame among the youth in Kabul and held many concerts in Kabul, Mazari Sharif, and Jalal-Abad. Eventually, Naim wanted to embark as a solo artist and approached Radio Kabul for a potential career.

At the age of 18, Naim arrived at Radio Kabul for auditions. The studio executives were impressed with his marketable good looks and his soft, mesmerizing vocal range. They immediately asked him to bring in musicians and record a few singles. During the summer of 1972, Naim released his first single, "Laila Nowroz Ast". The song became an instant classic and launched the young Naim as a household name. At the same time, he worked as a sound technician at Afghan Film alongside Ahmad Zahir, who was also a talented singer and would have a major influence on Naim's artistic spirit. Naim also worked at Radio Kabul as a producer for one of their popular game shows, Musabequay Zeeni. While recording at Radio Kabul, Naim released many singles that were featured on compilations released by the Ariana Music and Afghan Music record labels. Memorable songs from this time period are "Marday Tanha" and "Simin Bari Gul", which highlight Naim's singing abilities. As his music career thrived, Naim began headlining various festivals and performing at concerts throughout Afghanistan.

By 1975, Naim had reached superstardom in his native country and strove to expand his career to the next level. He consequently decided to leave Kabul for the thriving Iranian music scene. When Naim arrived in Tehran, he met up with close friend and fellow musician Khalil Ragheb. Together, they began playing music at small concerts and festivals in Tehran and Mashad. Naim became a superstar in Iran and was cherished alongside the many elite singers of that time such as Googoosh, Dariush, Ebi and many others. He recorded two tapes during this era with Khalil Ragheb; they took turns singing and composing tracks on both tapes. The duo also filmed several videos (which can be found on YouTube) for Rangarang Television, the mainstream Iranian music program, such as "Faghan Faghan", "Gunga Shawe Yaar", "Alisher-e-Khoda", and "Delakam". Memorable studio songs from this time period are "Shabgard", which speaks of a broken heart, and "Alisher-e-Khoda", which speaks of his love of spirituality. In "Shabgard" he showcased his true vocal ability by hitting notes that would be considered difficult by most singers and setting the standard by delivering those notes with ease.

When the Iranian Revolution occurred, Naim moved to the United States, where he continued his career in the city of Los Angeles. During that time, he began working with composers/arrangers such as Hassan Shamaizadeh, Ustad Shawali Taranasaz, Manouchehr Cheshmazar, Andranik and Naweed Nahwi. The result of these collaborations you can hear on the tape Aashenha, which is widely considered to be one of the greatest Afghan/Persian albums of all time. The lush arrangements and superb vocals showcased an artist that would melt the heart of millions. After Aashenha was released, Naim travelled all across the US, singing for thousands of Afghan and Persian families who had migrated to the US due to political turmoil in their home countries. He was the only Afghan singer who was entertaining families during the 1980s, the vast majority of other singers were still in Afghanistan, singing under the Communist Regime.

Throughout the '80s, he released several tapes for the Afghan community, including Shahkhaye Bishkasta in 1984, produced by Homayoon Jan, owner of Zazoo's restaurant in Oakland, CA. Other tapes released were Ashq-E-Asemon, Mataab and Sitayeshgar.
