= Ahmed Wali Karzai =

Afghan politician (1961-2011)

Ahmad Wali Karzai احمد ولي کرزی
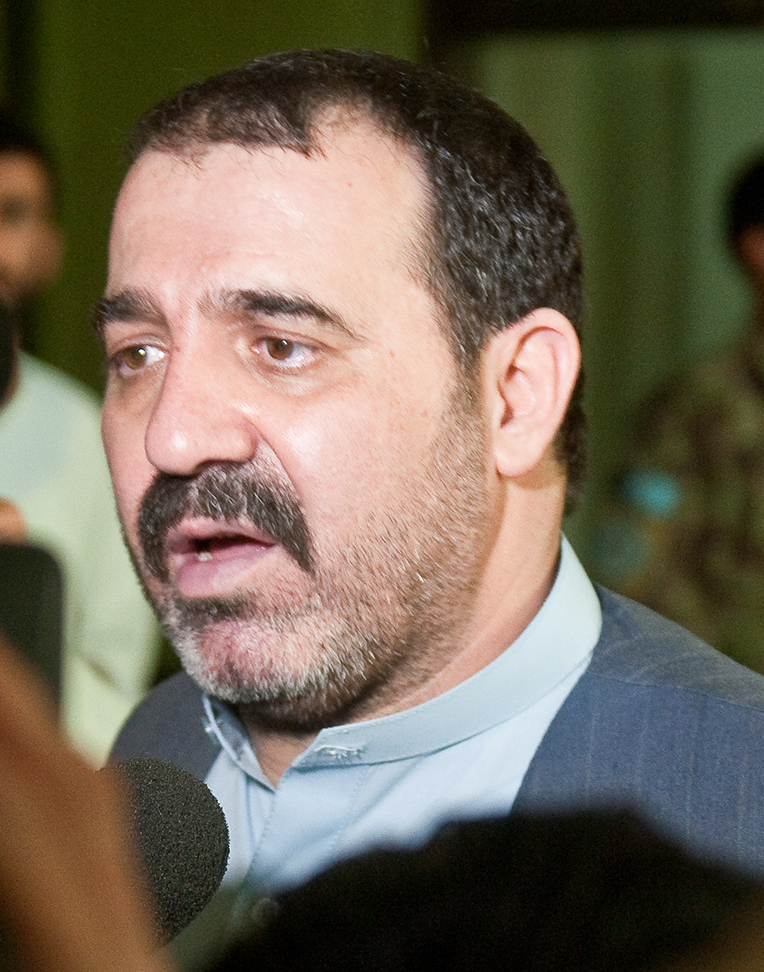
- Karzai in June 2010
- Born: 1961; Karz, Kandahar Province, Kingdom of Afghanistan
- Died: 12 July 2011 (aged 50); Kandahar, Afghanistan
- Occupations: Politician, businessman
- Known for: Politics, running a restaurant
- Children: 2 sons and 3 daughters

Ahmad Wali Karzai (Pashto: احمد ولي کرزی, Aḥmad Walī Karzay, 1961 – 12 July 2011) was an Afghan politician who served as Chairman of the Kandahar Provincial Council from 2005 until his assassination. He was the younger paternal half-brother of former Afghan President Hamid Karzai and an elder of the Popalzai tribe. Wali Karzai had formerly lived in the United States, where he managed a restaurant owned by his family. He returned to Afghanistan following the removal of the Taliban government in late 2001. He had been accused of political corruption and was allegedly on the CIA payroll. He was assassinated at his residence by one of his close bodyguards, Sardar Mohammad, on 12 July 2011.

== Early life and political career ==
Karzai was born in 1961 in the village of Karz in Kandahar Province, Afghanistan. He is the son of Abdul Ahad Karzai and brother of Hamid Karzai, Mahmud Karzai and Qayum Karzai. He attended Habibia High School in Kabul but was not able to finish his studies due to the Soviet–Afghan War. He travelled to neighbouring Pakistan and then immigrated to the United States. Wali Karzai managed an Afghan restaurant in Chicago that was owned by his family. Ahmad Wali returned to Pakistan in the late 1980s to help his father, Abdul Ahad.

He came to political prominence in Afghanistan following the US occupation of the country in 2001, where he was a key ally of the US military in the country's south. He was elected to the Kandahar Provincial Council in 2005 and exercised influence in the province to the extent that he was described as "effectively the governor". At the time of his death, he was the council's chairman.

A few days before his death, Ahmed Wali Karzai appeared on a British television programme, "Afghanistan: The Unknown Country," presented by Lyse Doucet, at his home in Kandahar, talking about public perceptions of him. Doucet said: "Like most strong men, he depended on family and fellow tribesmen to protect him."

== Allegations of corruption ==
A June 2009 U.S. embassy cable alleged that much of the actual business of running the Afghan city of Kandahar "takes place out of public sight, where Ahmed Wali Karzai operates, parallel to formal government structures, through a network of political clans that use state institutions to protect and enable licit and illicit enterprises." In addition, James Risen of The New York Times and others stated that Ahmed Wali Karzai may have been involved in the Afghan opium and heroin trade. This was denied by Karzai, who called the charges political propaganda and stated he was a "victim of vicious politics."

In meetings with Afghan President Hamid Karzai, including a 2006 session with former US Ambassador to Afghanistan, Ronald E. Neumann, the CIA's station chief and their British counterparts, American officials talked about the rumors in hopes that the president might move his brother out of the country, said several people who took part in or were briefed on the talks. "We thought the concern expressed to Karzai might be enough to get him out of there," one official said. President Karzai has resisted, however, demanding clear-cut evidence of wrongdoing, several officials said. "We don't have the kind of hard, direct evidence that you could take to get a criminal indictment," a White House official said. Ahmed Wali Karzai dismissed the allegations as politically motivated attacks by longtime rival groups in his country.

Before the 2009 Afghan presidential election, Wali Karzai and Sher Mohammad Akhundzada, former governor of the Helmand Province and a member of the Upper House of the Afghan parliament, were accused of vote rigging. After the election, reports mentioned that all those running in the election were involved in electoral fraud.

== CIA connections ==
In October 2009, The New York Times reported that Ahmed Wali Karzai received payments from the Central Intelligence Agency for "a variety of services", including the recruitment of the Kandahar Strike Force, an Afghan paramilitary force run by the CIA in the Kandahar region. It also stated that he was paid for allowing the CIA and U.S. special forces to rent the former residence of Taliban supreme leader Mullah Omar. However, Karzai has denied taking any payment from the CIA. U.S. Senator John Kerry and former Afghan Ambassador to the United States, Said Tayeb Jawad, defended Karzai in recent years, Kerry saying "We should not condemn Ahmed Wali Karzai or damage our critical relations with his brother, President Karzai, on the basis of newspaper articles or rumors" and Jawad saying, "There is presence of the intelligence, there's presence of many institutions of the United States and NATO countries in Afghanistan, why don't they come up with a clear evidence of any corruption involving the president or his family?"

== Assassination ==
Karzai survived a number of assassination attempts by Taliban militants and at least two attacks against his office in Kandahar: one in November 2008 and the other in April 2009. According to Karzai himself, he had survived a total of nine assassination attempts.

On 12 July 2011, Karzai was assassinated by his long-time head of security, Sardar Mohammad. Reports say that Wali was shot twice with a pistol, once in the head and once in the chest, as he was coming out of the bathroom inside his residence. Abdul Raziq, Police Chief of Kandahar, stated that the assailant Sardar Mohammad was well known by the Karzai family. He had served as Wali Karzai's most trusted security guard for the last seven years. "As he entered Wali's room, Wali came out of his bathroom. Mohammad fired twice at Wali without any conversation passing between the two. Wali received one bullet in the chest and second in the head," Abdul Raziq said. The assailant was immediately killed by other bodyguards and his body was then hanged at a city square in public view. In the meantime, Karzai's body was taken to Mirwais Hospital in Kandahar.

Thousands of people turned up for his funeral the next day, led by Afghan President Hamid Karzai, and many more waited in buses where his body lay to be taken to his hometown of Karz. Security was tightened around the funeral procession and some reports indicated Hamid Karzai's elite security team were deployed to secure Kandahar, where the funeral was held. At the funeral procession Hamid Karzai issued a message to the Taliban:

"My message for [the Taliban] is that my countryman, my brother, stop killing your own people. It's easy to kill and everyone can do it, but the real man is the one who can save people's lives."

— Hamid Karzai, President of Afghanistan

Hamid Karzai's spokesman Waheed Omer said that "We know we live in a dangerous country. We know that security has to be tight all the time and the president knows [this]. He's got good security and that is not a worry for the president. The president is upset, he is still in grief, about the death of his brother. Wali was a very close brother of the president." En route to the funeral Helmand Governor Gulab Mangal escaped an assassination attempt, while later in the evening two more blasts went off in Kandahar. Though Hamid Karzai led the funeral procession, he was not present at a memorial service which was attacked by a suicide bomber killing the senior cleric of the mosque Hikmatullah Hikmat, the head of the Provincial Ulema Council, who died along with three others while 13 others were also wounded.

=== Reactions ===
President Hamid Karzai issued a statement on the day his brother died, saying: "My younger brother was martyred in his house today. This is the life of all Afghan people, I hope these miseries which every Afghan family faces will one day end." Afghan families, every one of us, have suffered from it, and we hope, God willing, for our suffering to be over. US General David Petraeus, other top NATO personnel serving in Afghanistan, officials at the White House and many world leaders condemned the assassination.

Taliban spokesman Qari Yousef Ahmadi claimed that one of their agents was behind the assassination saying, "Today in Kandahar city, Hamid Karzai's brother was killed during the Operation al-Badr... We hired a person by the name of Sadar Mohammad, who was hired for this job for some time now. Ahmed Wali Karzai was punished for all his wrongdoings."

However, according to The Christian Science Monitor, the Taliban has "a dubious record of claiming responsibility for attacks it had nothing to do with", and its claim has been denied by several sources. Abdul Ghafar Sayedzada, head of the counter-terrorism department at the Interior Ministry, told Reuters that "It appears Ahmed Wali Karzai has been killed by one of his bodyguard, and there was nobody from outside involved." The news was confirmed by Zalmai Ayubi, the spokesman for Kandahar province, as well as by Sediq Sediqqi, a spokesman for the Ministry of Interior. Following the killing, police were mobilised in Kandahar and helicopters were seen overhead as checkpoints were locked down leading towards the hospital his body was taken to.

=== Investigations ===
Investigators believe that Sardar Mohammad may have been a Taliban sleeper agent or a government defector. Mahmud Karzai, Karzai's other brother, stated that Sardar Mohammad traveled to the Pakistani city of Quetta within the past three months to meet with the Shura Council of the Taliban. Mahmoud Karzai claimed that he has been acting very erratically in recent weeks, including sleeping poorly, moving from house to house during nights, acting suspiciously toward his men and demanding to know who they were talking to on their mobile phones.
