= Rehana Popal =

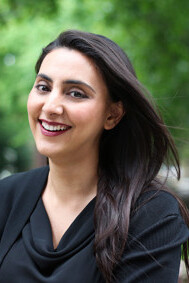
- Popal in 2023
- Born: 1989 (age 36–37); Afghanistan
- Education: City University, London
- Occupation: Barrister
- Known for: First Afghan national to be called to the Bar in the UK
- Awards: 100 Women (BBC) (2021)

Rehana Popal (born 1989) is a British-Afghan lawyer who became the first Afghan woman to practice as a barrister in England and Wales. In 2021 she received the 100 Women (BBC) award.

== Early life and education ==
Rehana Popal was born in 1989 in Afghanistan. She arrived in the United Kingdom as a five-year-old refugee, accompanied by her mother and three older siblings, and grew up on a council estate in inner London. After completing her early education, she was admitted to study international politics at City University, from where she graduated in 2011. The following year, she completed her Graduate Diploma in Law (GDL) at The City Law School.

Before her pupillage, Rehana worked as a paralegal at Leigh Day, supporting civil claims brought by Afghans alleging human rights abuses by British forces. In 2013 she was called to the Bar, becoming the first Afghan national to be called to the bar by the Inner Temple.

== Career ==
In 2018, Popal was the only female Afghan barrister practising in England and Wales, working as an immigration and civil law barrister at 10 King’s Bench Walk Chambers in the Temple. That year she was taken off a case when a client asked to be represented by a white male, believing this would carry greater credibility with an English judge. This incident led the chair of the Bar Council to send a message to solicitors reminding them that "Discrimination against a barrister on the basis of a protected characteristic is completely unacceptable". Popal later said that she did not blame the solicitor, but that the problem lay in "the client's perception of the justice system, however incorrect or prejudiced".

In 2019 she was recognised as "Barrister of the Year" in the First 100 Years campaign's Inspirational Women in Law awards. In 2021 she was included in the BBC 100 Women list. She works to assist Afghans who served with the British armed forces during the war in Afghanistan.

As of 2026 she is a member of No5 Barristers' Chambers in London. She is a Master of the Bench of the Inner Temple and, in 2022 when appointed, was the youngest person to become a bencher. In 2024, in South Asian Heritage Month, the Inner Temple Yearbook included her in a feature on "some of our distinguished South Asian Members" alongside Gandhi and Nehru.
