= Popalzai =

Durrani Pashtun tribe

Popalzai پوپلزی
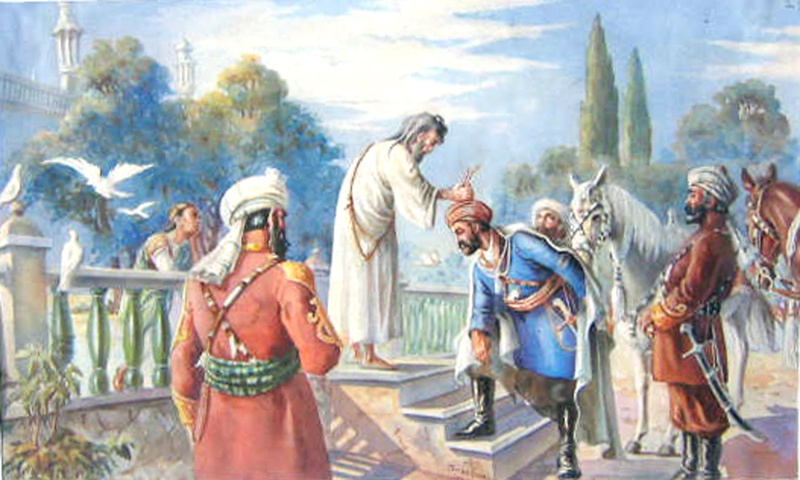
- Coronation of Ahmad Shah Durr-i-Durrān by Abdali chiefs at Kandahar in 1747
- Ethnicity: Pashtun
- Location: Afghanistan
- Parent tribe: Zirak (Durrani)
- Branches: Saddozai
- Language: Pashto
- Religion: Islam

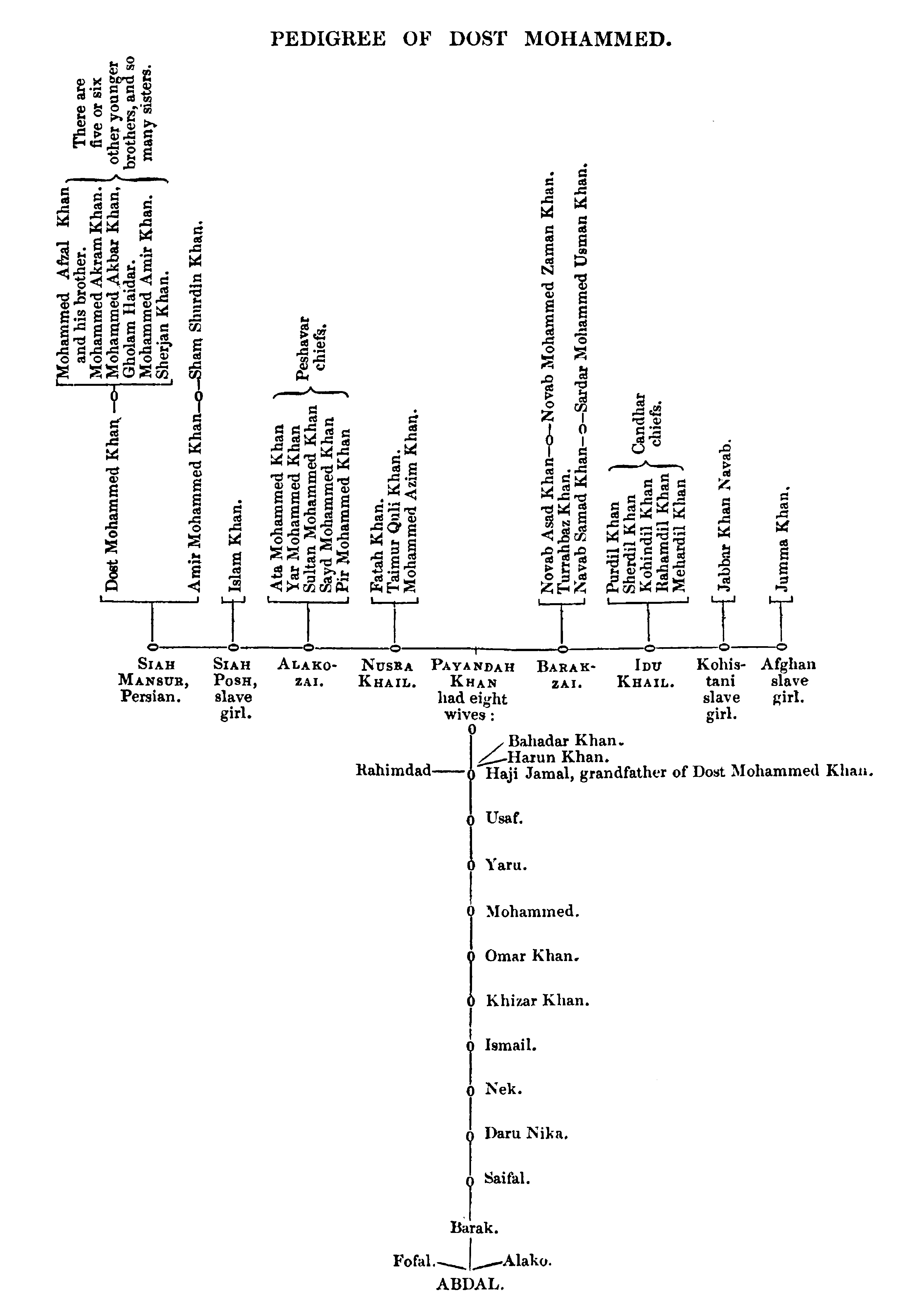
Pedigree of King Dost Mohammad Khan, Emir of Afghanistan. Figure shows the branching of the Abdal dynasty into the Popal (founder of the Popalzai; spelled 'Fofal' in figure), Barak (founder of the Barakzai), and Alako (founder of the Alakozai) line. (The fourth branch, Achakzai, is missing.)

Popalzai or Popalzay (Pashto: پوپلزی), also known as Popal, are Durrani (formerly called Abdali or Bor Tareen) Pashtuns of Afghanistan. The Popalzai are part of the Zirak confederation of Pashtun tribes. The origin of the Abdali forefathers of the Saddozai tribe is probably the Hephthalites. The forefathers of Ahmad Shāh Durrānī, the founder of the Durrani Empire, were from the Sadozai tribe which is a subtribe of the Popalzai. According to Mohan Lal, the Zirak line begins with Sulaiman Zirak Khan, who was the father of Popalzai, Barakzai, and Alakozai. The tribe's origin is Kandahar, Afghanistan. The majority of the Popalzai live in the southern areas of Afghanistan such as in Kandahar, Helmand or Uruzgan. Some members of the Popalzai tribe have migrated with their families to the European Union, North America, and Oceania. Notable members of the Popalzai tribe include Hamid Karzai and his extended family, Karim Popal, Naim Popal, and Khalida Popal.

== Notable people ==
- Abdul Ghani Baradar, co-founder and deputy leader of the Taliban
- Ahmad Shah Durrani, Founder of the Durrani Empire
- Ahmed Wali Karzai
- Hamid Karzai, President of Afghanistan 2001–2014
- Khairullah Khairkhwa
- Jan Mohammad Khan
- Khan Mohammad Khan
- Ghulam Jilani Popal
- Rehana Popal (born 1989), British-Afghan lawyer
- Jahan Khan Popalzai, Commander-in-Chief of the Durrani Empire
