= Karz, Kandahar =

Karz کرز
- Location in Afghanistan
- Coordinates: 31°34′N 65°43′E
- Country: Afghanistan
- Province: Kandahar Province
- Time zone: UTC+4:30

Karz (Pashto: کرز) is a village in Kandahar Province, Afghanistan, near the city of Kandahar.

The Afghan former president, Hamid Karzai, is from Karz. His father is buried there. On July 29, 2014, his cousin, Hashmat Karzai, was killed by a suicide bomber there.

== See also ==
- Kandahar Province
