= Hamid Karzai =

President of Afghanistan from 2002 to 2014

- حامد کرزی
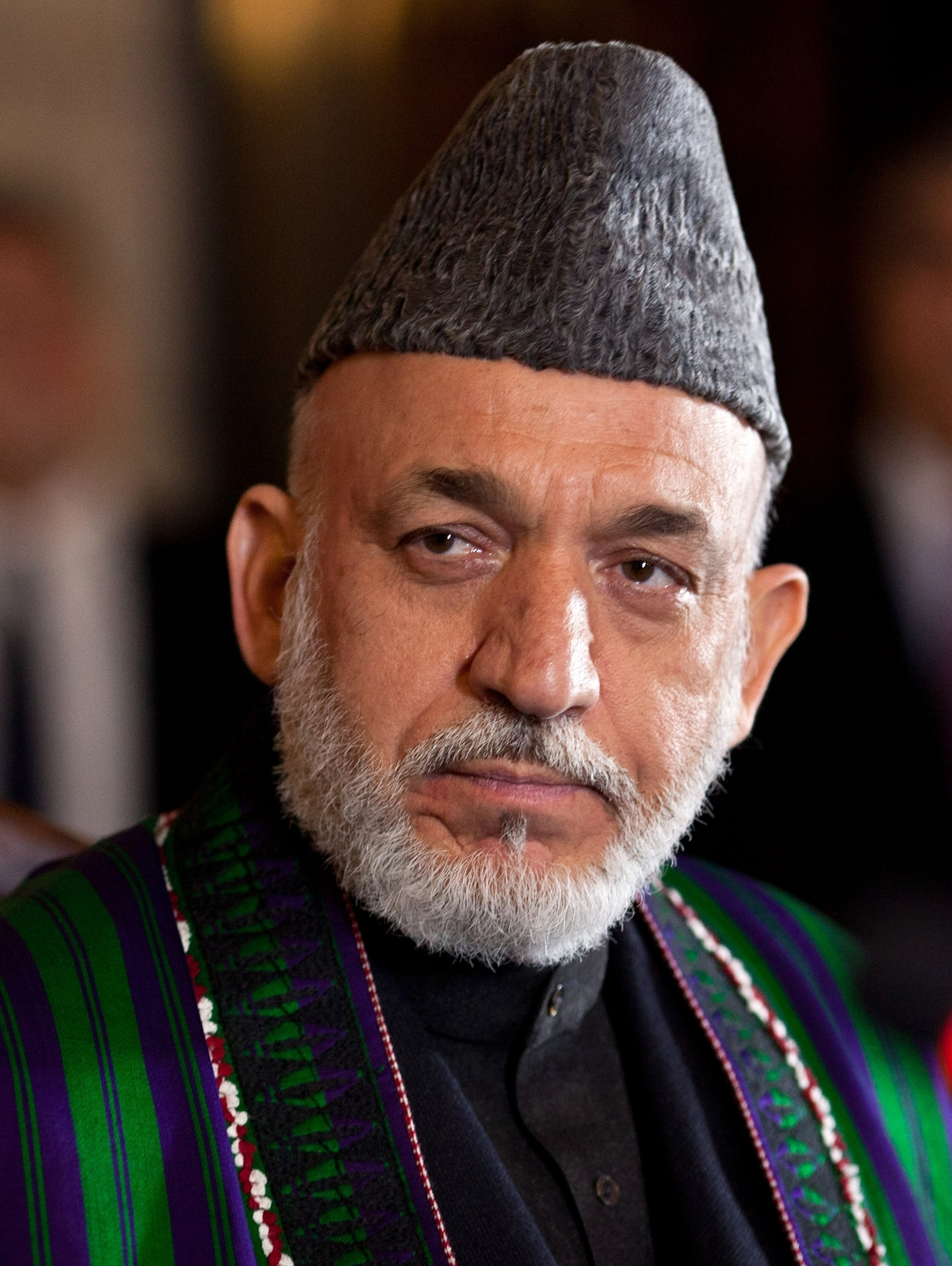
- Karzai in 2012

7th President of Afghanistan
- In office 19 June 2002 – 29 September 2014
- Vice President: Hedayat Amin Arsala; Mohammed Fahim; Nematullah Shahrani; Karim Khalili; Abdul Qadir; Ahmad Zia Massoud; Yunus Qanuni
- Preceded by: Burhanuddin Rabbani
- Succeeded by: Ashraf Ghani

Chairman of the Afghan Interim Administration
- In office 22 December 2001 – 19 June 2002
- Vice Chairman: Sima Samar; Mohammed Fahim; Muhammad Mohaqiq; Mohammad Shakir Kargar; Hedayat Amin Arsala

Personal details
- Born: 24 December 1957 (age 68) Karz, Afghanistan
- Party: Independent
- Spouse: Zeenat Karzai (m. 1999)
- Children: 4
- Parent: Abdul Ahad Karzai (father)
- Education: Himachal Pradesh University

Military service
- Battles/wars: War in Afghanistan United States invasion of Afghanistan: Battle of Tarinkot; Battle of Sayyd Alma Kalay; Fall of Kandahar; Taliban insurgency

Hamid Karzai (Note: /ˈhɑːmɪd ˈkɑːrzaɪ/ HAHM-id KAHR-zy; Pashto: حامد کرزی, romanized: Hāmid Karzay, pronounced [hɑˈmɪd kɐɾˈzɐɪ]; Dari: حامد کرزیی, romanized: Hāmid Karzayī, pronounced [hɑːˈmɪd kʰɐɾzɐˈjiː]) (born 24 December 1957) is a former Afghan politician who served as the seventh president of Afghanistan from 2002 to 2014, particularly as the first president of the Islamic Republic of Afghanistan from 2004 to 2014. He also served as chairman of the Afghan Interim Administration from 2001 to 2002.

Born in Kandahar, Karzai graduated from Habibia High School in Kabul and later received a master's degree from Himachal Pradesh University, Summerhill, Shimla, India, in the 1980s. He moved to Pakistan where he was active as a fundraiser for the Afghan mujahideen during the Soviet–Afghan War (1979–1989) and its aftermath. He briefly served as Deputy Foreign Minister in the Islamic State of Afghanistan government. In July 1999, Karzai's father was assassinated and Karzai succeeded him as head of the Popalzai tribe. In October 2001 the United States invasion of Afghanistan began and Karzai led the Pashtun tribes in and around Kandahar in an uprising against the Taliban; he became a dominant political figure after the removal of the Taliban regime in late 2001. During the December 2001 International Conference on Afghanistan in Germany, Karzai was selected by prominent Afghan political figures to serve a six-month term as chairman of the Interim Administration.

He was then chosen for a two-year term as interim president during the 2002 loya jirga (grand assembly) that was held in Kabul, Afghanistan. After the 2004 presidential election, Karzai was declared the winner and became President of Afghanistan. He won a second five-year term in the 2009 presidential election; this term ended in September 2014, and he was succeeded by Ashraf Ghani.

During his presidency, Karzai was known in the international community for being an alliance builder between Afghanistan's multi-ethnic communities. He also strengthened Afghanistan–Pakistan relations. In later years, his relationship with NATO and the United States became increasingly strained. Karzai's stance on extremism and terrorism was criticized. Karzai described the Taliban as his brothers, and warned that the heavy-handed counterinsurgency in Afghanistan would only revive the Taliban insurgency against the former Afghan government. Instead he urged the US to instead focus on subduing Pakistan's support for the Taliban leadership, but the US largely ignored his requests. Karzai was also accused of corruption.

After the Taliban takeover of Kabul in 2021, Karzai stated the Taliban did not capture the city by force, but rather were invited by him in order to prevent chaos. He said that in order to gain international recognition, the new Taliban government needed internal legitimacy, which could be achieved through a general election or loya jirga.

== Early life and beginning of political career ==
Karzai was born on 24 December 1957 in the Karz area of Kandahar City in southern Afghanistan. Hamid belongs to the Popalzai tribe of Durrani Pashtuns and was the local chief of the tribe in Kandahar Province. His father, Abdul Ahad Karzai, served as the Deputy Speaker of the Afghan Parliament during the 1960s. His grandfather, Khair Mohammad Khan, had fought in the 1919 Third Anglo-Afghan War and was the Deputy Speaker of the Senate. The Karzai family were monarchists and remained strong supporters of Mohammed Zahir Shah, the last king of Afghanistan. His uncle, Habibullah Karzai, served as the Afghan representative at the UN and is said to have accompanied King Zahir to the United States in the early 1960s for a special meeting with U.S. President John F. Kennedy.

Hamid Karzai attended Mahmood Hotaki Primary School in Kandahar and Sayed Jamaluddin Afghani School in Kabul. He graduated from Habibia High School in Kabul in 1976. After graduating, he went to India as an exchange student in 1976, and studied for a master's degree in international relations and political science at Himachal Pradesh University in Shimla, obtaining his degree in 1983. Karzai then moved to Pakistan and worked as a fundraiser for the anti-communist Afghan rebels during their 1980s uprising against the rule of Soviet-backed Afghan Mohammad Najibullah.

Hamid Karzai returned to Afghanistan in early October 1988, late in the war, to assist in the rebel victory in Tarinkot. He assisted in mobilizing the Popalzai and the other Durrani tribes and helped to drive Najibullah's regime from the city. Karzai also helped negotiate the defection of five hundred of Najibullah's soldiers. When Najibullah's pro-Soviet government collapsed in 1992, the Peshawar Accords agreed upon by the Afghan political parties established the Islamic State of Afghanistan and appointed an interim government to be followed by general elections. Karzai accompanied the first mujahideen leaders into Kabul after President Najibullah stepped down in 1992. He served as Deputy Foreign Minister in the government of Burhanuddin Rabbani. Karzai was arrested, however, by Mohammad Fahim (who would later become Karzai's vice president) on charges of spying for Gulbuddin Hekmatyar in what Karzai claimed was an effort to negotiate between Hekmatyar's forces and Rabbani's government. Karzai fled from Kabul in a vehicle provided by Hekmatyar and driven by Gul Rahman.

When the Taliban emerged in the mid-1990s, Karzai initially recognized them as the legitimate government because he thought that they would stop the violence and corruption in the country. He was requested by the Taliban to serve as their ambassador, but refused, telling friends that he felt Pakistan's Inter-Services Intelligence (ISI) was wrongly using them. Karzai then wanted to represent the Taliban government for the UN, but the Taliban leader did not trust Karzai due to him having many links with westerners. Karzai lived in the Pakistani city of Quetta among many other Afghan refugees, where he worked to reinstate former Afghan king Zahir Shah, meeting the king in Italy several times. He also visited Western embassies (including the U.S. embassy in Islamabad) several times, talking with UN diplomat Norbert Holl, and attempted to gain American support for "modern, educated Afghans" to weaken the Taliban's views. Karzai's father was reportedly annoyed with him for not making clear-cut choices and wanting to be friends with everyone.

In July 1999, Karzai's father, Abdul Ahad Karzai, was shot dead early in the morning while returning home from a mosque in Quetta. Reports suggest that the Taliban carried out the assassination. Following this incident, Karzai took over as khan of the tribe and decided to work closely with the anti-Taliban Northern Alliance, which was led by Ahmad Shah Massoud.

In 2000 and 2001, he travelled to Europe and the United States to help gather support for the anti-Taliban movement. "Massoud and Karzai warned the United States that the Taliban were connected with al Qaeda and that there was a plot for an imminent attack on the United States, but their warnings went unheeded. On September 9, 2001, two days before the September 11 attacks in the US, Massoud was assassinated by al Qaeda agents in a suicide bombing." As the U.S. Armed Forces were preparing for a confrontation with the Taliban in September 2001, Karzai began urging NATO states to purge his country of al-Qaeda. He said in a BBC interview, "These Arabs, together with their foreign supporters and the Taliban, destroyed miles and miles of homes and orchards and vineyards ... They have killed Afghans. They have trained their guns on Afghan lives ... We want them out."

== President and chairman of a transitional administration ==
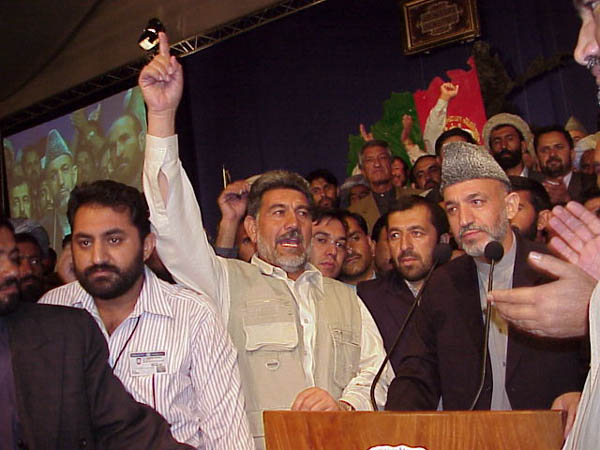
Karzai appointed as President of the Afghan Transitional Administration at the June 2002 loya jirga (grand assembly) in Kabul, Afghanistan

Karzai had been a US CIA contact, and was well regarded by the CIA. After the 7 October 2001 launch of Operation Enduring Freedom, the United Front (Northern Alliance) worked with teams of U.S. special forces and together they overthrew the Taliban regime and mustered support for a new government in Afghanistan. Karzai and his group were in Quetta, where they began a covert operation. Later, many would claim that at this moment the US decided that Karzai should be the next leader of Afghanistan. Before entering Afghanistan, he warned his fighters.

Karzai gathered several hundred fighters from his tribe, but were attacked by the Taliban. Karzai barely survived, and used his contacts with the CIA to call for an airlift. On 4 November 2001, American special operation forces flew Karzai out of Afghanistan for protection. On 5 December 2001, Hamid Karzai and his group of fighters survived a friendly fire missile attack by U.S. Air Force pilots in southern Afghanistan. The group suffered injuries and was treated in the United States; Karzai received injuries to his facial nerves, as can sometimes be noticed during his speeches.

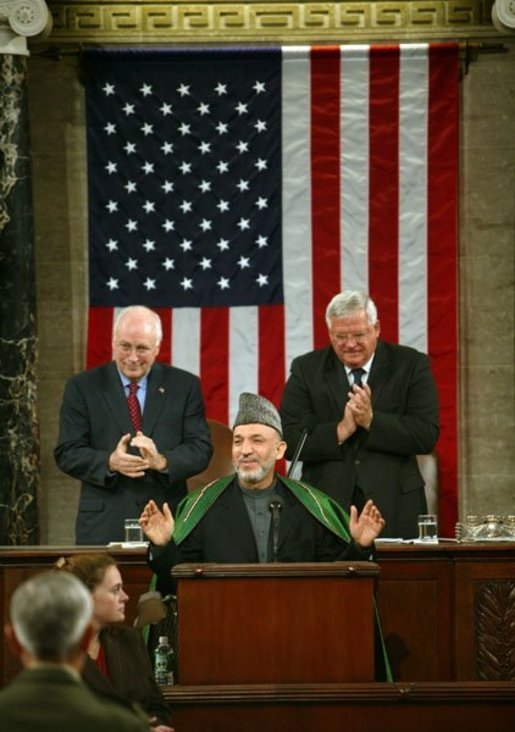
Karzai speaking before the U.S. Congress in June 2004

In December 2001, political leaders gathered in Germany to agree on new leadership structures. Under 5 December Bonn Agreement, they formed an Interim Administration and named Karzai Chairman of a 29-member governing committee. He was sworn in as the leader on 22 December. The loya jirga of 13 June 2002 appointed Karzai as Interim President of the new position as President of the Afghan Transitional Administration. Former members of the Northern Alliance remained extremely influential, most notably Vice President Mohammed Fahim, who also served as the Defense Minister.

Karzai re-enacted the original coronation of Ahmad Shah Durrani at the shrine of Sher-i-Surkh outside Kandahar, where he had leaders of various Afghan tribes, including a descendant of the religious leader (Sabir Shah) who originally selected Ahmad Shah Durrani in 1747, as key players in this event. Further evidence that Karzai views himself fulfilling a Durrani monarch's role arises from statements furnished by close allies within his government. His late brother, Ahmed Wali Karzai, made statements to a similar effect.

As part of his efforts to unite Afghanistan's ethnicities, Karzai favored an Afghan dress that combines traditional design features from the various ethnics – Pashtun-style long shirt and loose trousers, an outer robe popular among the Tajiks and Uzbeks, and most distinctively a karakul hat worn by highlanders from the valley of Panjshir. In 2002 designer Tom Ford, who worked at the time for Gucci, was quoted calling Karzai "the most chic man in the world".

After Karzai was installed into power, his actual authority outside the capital city of Kabul was said to be so limited that he was often derided as the "Mayor of Kabul". The situation was particularly delicate since Karzai and his administration have not been equipped either financially or politically to influence reforms outside of the region around Kabul. Other areas, particularly the more remote ones, have historically been under the influence of various local leaders. Karzai has been, to varying degrees of success, attempting to negotiate and form amicable alliances with them for the benefit of Afghanistan as a whole, instead of aggressively fighting them and risking an uprising.

In 2004, he rejected an international proposal to end poppy production in Afghanistan through aerial spraying of chemical herbicides, fearing that it would harm the economic situation of his countrymen. Moreover, Karzai's younger brother, Ahmed Wali Karzai – who partially helped finance Karzai's presidential campaign – was rumored to be involved in narcotic deals. James Risen of The New York Times and others stated that Ahmed Wali Karzai may have been involved in the Afghan opium and heroin trade. This was denied by Karzai, who called the charges political propaganda and stated he was a "victim of vicious politics".

== 2004 Afghan presidential election ==
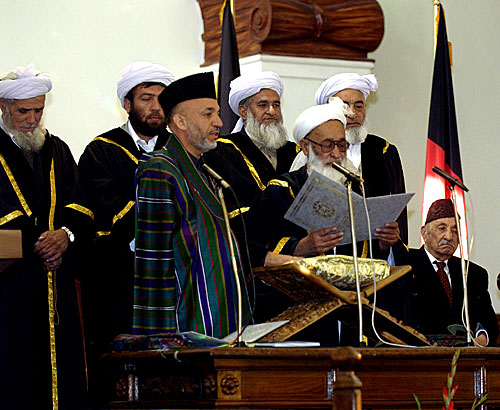
Karzai's inauguration on 7 December 2004, after winning the presidential election

When Karzai was a candidate in the October 2004 presidential election, he won 21 of the 34 provinces, defeating his 22 opponents and becoming the first democratically elected leader of Afghanistan.

Although his campaigning was limited due to fears of violence, elections passed without significant incident. Following an investigation by the United Nations of alleged voting irregularities, the national election commission in early November declared Karzai winner, without a runoff, with 55.4% of the vote. This represented 4.3 million of the total 8.1 million votes cast. The election took place safely in spite of a surge of insurgent activity.

Karzai was sworn in as President of the Islamic Republic of Afghanistan on 7 December 2004, at a formal ceremony in Kabul. Many interpreted the ceremony as a symbolically important "new start" for the war-torn nation. Notable guests at the inauguration included the country's former King, Zahir Shah, three former U.S. presidents, and U.S. Vice President Dick Cheney.

== Presidency ==
=== First term (2004–2009) ===
After winning a democratic mandate in the 2004 election, it was thought that Karzai would pursue a more aggressively reformist path in 2005. However, Karzai proved more cautious than expected. After his new administration took over in 2004, the economy of Afghanistan began growing rapidly for the first time in many years. Government revenue began increasing every year, although it was still heavily dependent on foreign aid.

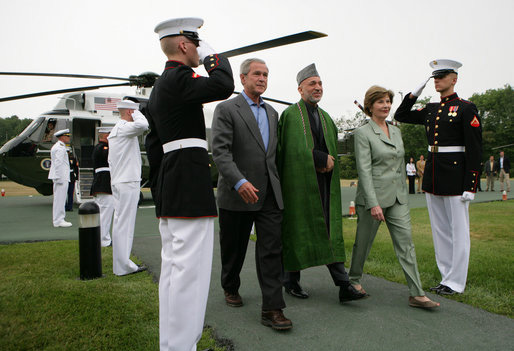
Karzai with U.S. President George W. Bush and wife Laura Bush at Camp David in 2007

During the first term in Karzai's presidency, public discontent grew about corruption and the civilian casualties in the 2001–14. In May 2006, an anti-American and anti-Karzai riot took place in Kabul which left at least seven people dead and 40 injured. In May 2007, after as many as 51 Afghan civilians were killed in a bombing, Karzai asserted that his government "can no longer accept" casualties caused by U.S. and NATO operations.

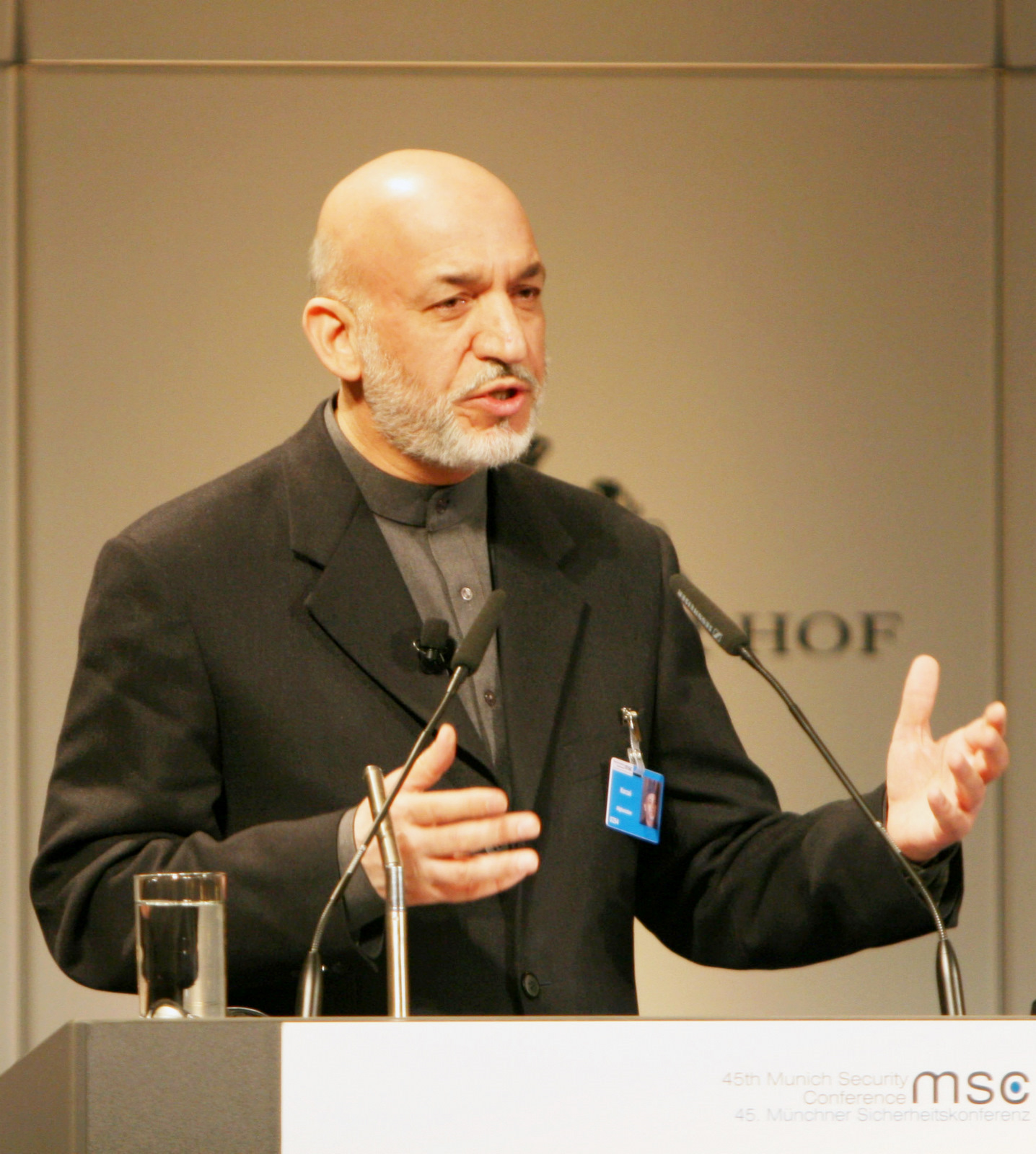
Karzai in February 2009

In September 2006, Karzai told the United Nations General Assembly that Afghanistan had become the "worst victim" of terrorism. Karzai said terrorism was rebounding in his country, with militants infiltrating the borders to wage attacks on civilians. He stated, "This does not have its seeds alone in Afghanistan. Military action in the country will, therefore, not deliver the shared goal of eliminating terrorism." He demanded assistance from the international community to destroy terrorist sanctuaries inside and outside Afghanistan. "You have to look beyond Afghanistan to the sources of terrorism", he told the UN General Assembly, and "destroy terrorist sanctuaries beyond" the country, dismantle the elaborate networks in the region that recruit, indoctrinate, train, finance, arm, and deploy terrorists. These activities are also robbing thousands of Afghan children of their right to education, and prevent health workers from doing their jobs in Afghanistan. In addition, he promised to eliminate opium-poppy cultivation in his country, which was possibly helping fuel the ongoing Taliban insurgency. He repeatedly demanded that NATO forces take more care to avoid civilian casualties when conducting military operations in residential areas. In a September 2006 video broadcast, Karzai stated that if the money wasted on the Iraq War had been actually spent on rebuilding Afghanistan, his country would "be in heaven in less than one year".

=== 2009 re-election and second term ===
On the eve of the presidential election on 20 August, Karzai seemed at once deeply unpopular but also likely to win the majority of the votes. He was blamed by many for the failures that plagued the reconstruction of Afghanistan after the toppling of the Taliban government in 2001, from the widespread corruption and the resurgence of the (neo-)Taliban to the explosion of the poppy trade. His unpopularity and the likelihood of his victory formed an atmosphere of national demoralization, which could have discouraged many Afghans from voting and dashed hopes for substantial progress after the election.

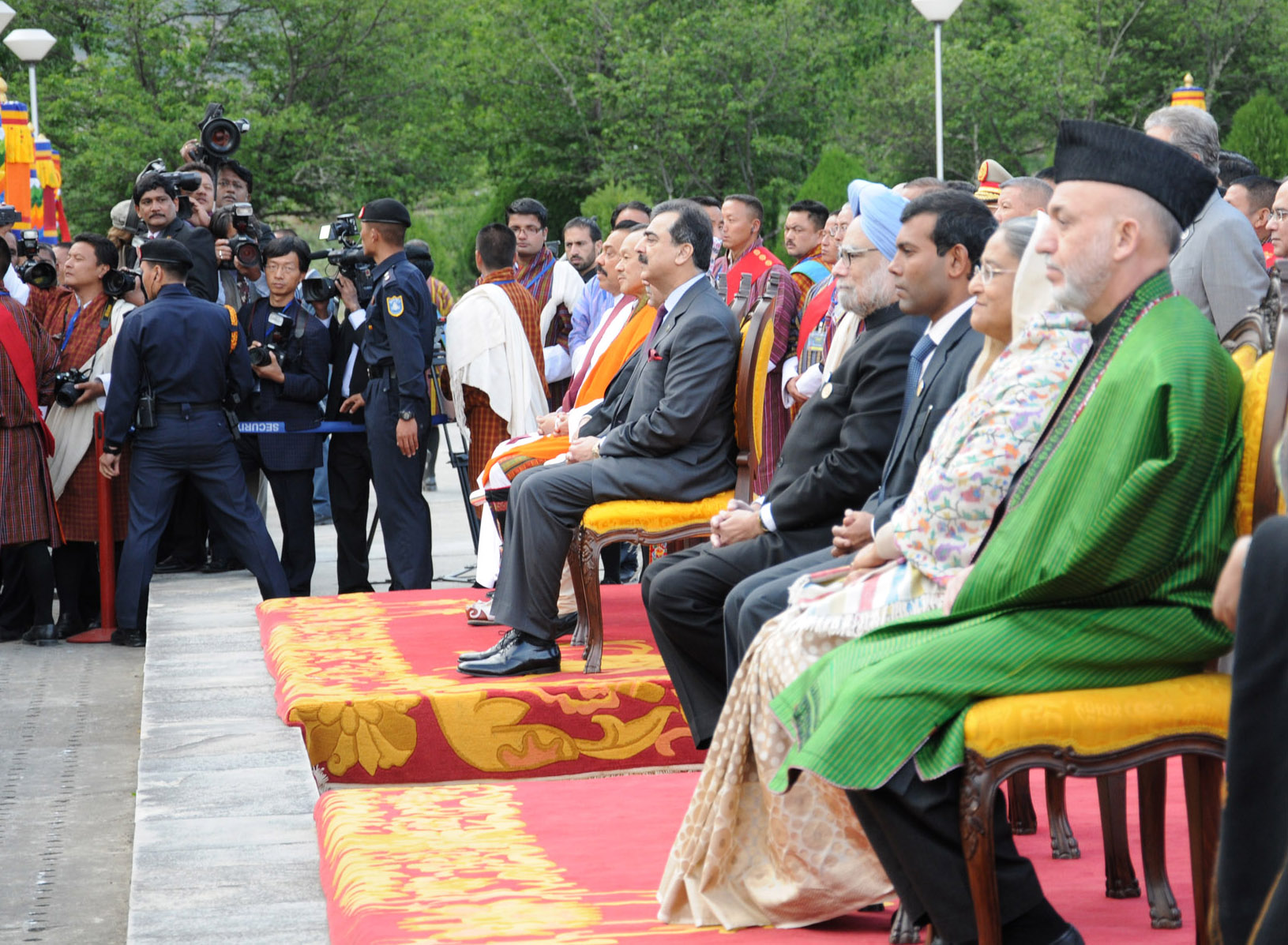
Hamid Kazarai in Bhutan, 2010

In this second presidential election, Karzai was announced to have received over 50% of the votes. The election was tainted by lack of security, low voter turnout and widespread ballot stuffing, intimidation, and other electoral fraud.

Two months later Karzai accepted calls for a second round run-off vote, which was scheduled for 7 November 2009.

During the runoff, he secured the support of influential power brokers, including the Ismailis in Afghanistan, represented locally by Sayed Mansur Naderi. Naderi facilitated two significant campaign rallies for him, one in Kayan, his birthplace, and another in the Kabul stadium. Both events attracted nearly a hundred thousand attendees, including men, women, and youths, demonstrating the support of the Afghan Ismailis for Hamid Karzai.

On 2 November 2009, Karzai's run-off opponent, Abdullah Abdullah, withdrew from the race and election officials announced the cancellation of the run-off race. Karzai, the only remaining contender, was declared the winner a short time later.

Karzai presented his first list of 24 cabinet nominees to the Afghan parliament on 19 December 2009; however, on 2 January 2010, the parliament rejected 17 of these. According to the parliament, most of the nominees were rejected due to having been picked for reasons other than their competency. A member of parliament said that they had been picked largely based on "ethnicity or bribery or money".

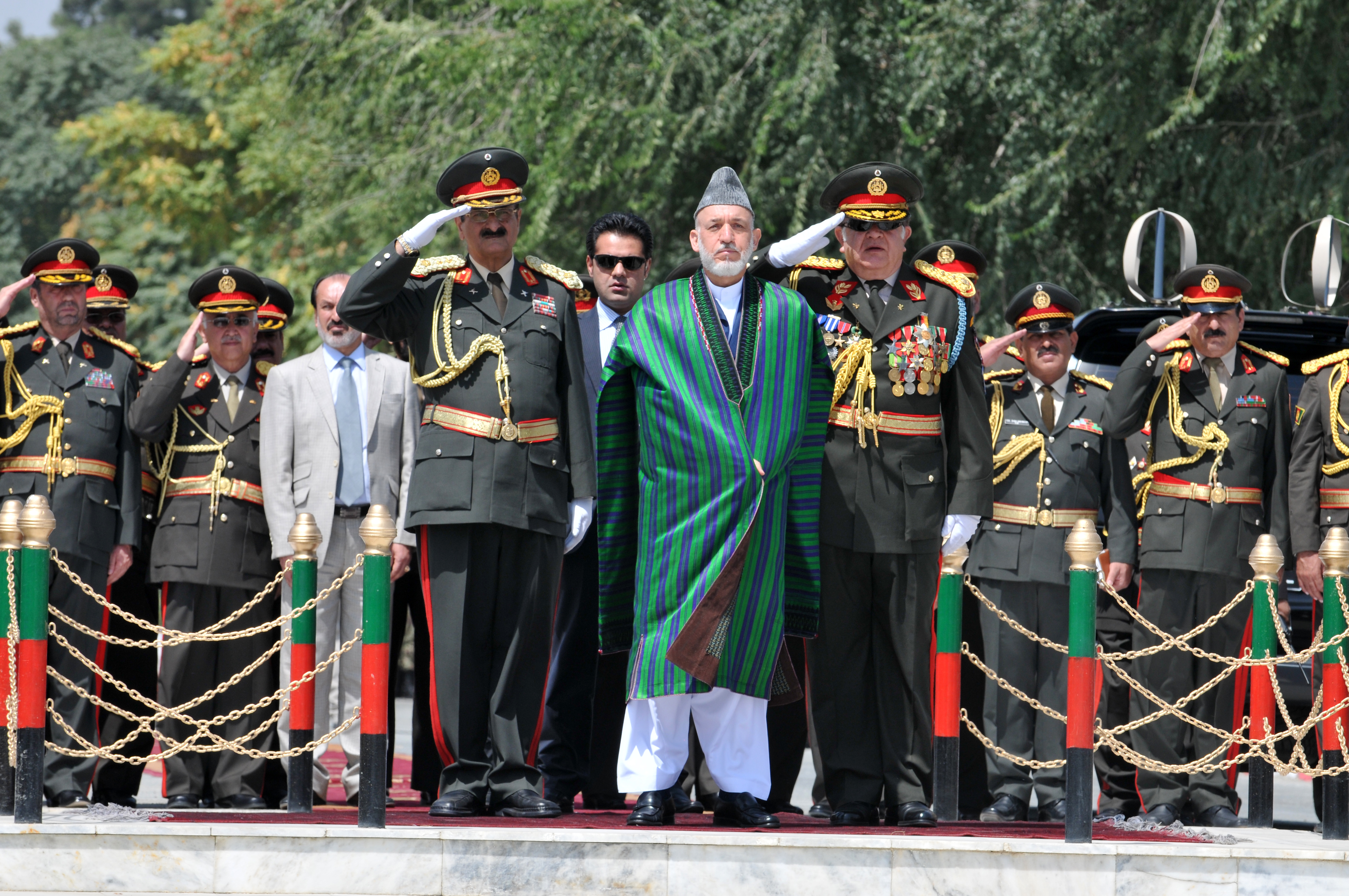
Karzai at the 2011 Afghan Independence Day in Kabul, which is held every year on 19 August to commemorate Afghanistan's independence from British control over its foreign affairs.

On 16 January 2010, the Afghan parliament rejected 10 of the Karzai's 17 replacement picks for the cabinet. MPs complained that Karzai's new choices were either not qualified for their posts or had close connections to Afghan warlords. Despite the second setback, by mid-January Karzai had 14 out of the 24 ministers confirmed, including the most powerful posts at foreign, defense and interior ministries. Shortly afterward, the parliament began its winter recess, lasting until 20 February, without waiting for Karzai to select additional names for his cabinet. The move not only extended the political uncertainty in the government but also dealt Karzai the embarrassment of appearing at the London Conference on Afghanistan with nearly half of his cabinet devoid of leaders.

Since late 2001 Karzai has been trying for peace in his country, going as far as pardoning militants that lay down weapons and join the rebuilding process. However, his offers were not accepted by the militant groups. In April 2007, Karzai acknowledged that he spoke to some militants about trying to bring peace in Afghanistan. He noted that the Afghan militants are always welcome in the country, although foreign insurgents are not. In September 2007, Karzai again offered talks with militant fighters after a security scare forced him to end a commemoration speech. Karzai left the event and was taken back to his palace, where he was due to meet visiting Latvian President Valdis Zatlers. After the meeting, the pair held a joint news conference, at which Karzai called for talks with his Taliban foes. "We don't have any formal negotiations with the Taliban. They don't have an address. Who do we talk to?" Karzai told reporters. He further stated: "If I can have a place where to send somebody to talk to, an authority that publicly says it is the Taliban authority, I will do it."

In December 2009 Karzai announced to move ahead with a Loya Jirga (large assembly) to discuss the Taliban insurgency in which the Taliban representatives would be invited to take part in this Jirga. In January 2010, Karzai set the framework for dialogue with Taliban leaders when he called on the group's leadership to take part in the jirga to initiate peace talks. A Taliban spokesman declined to talk in detail about Karzai's offer and only said the militants would make a decision soon. In April 2010, Karzai urged Taliban insurgents to lay down their arms and air their grievances while visiting a violent northern province, adding that foreign forces would not leave the country as long as fighting continued. In July 2010, Karzai approved a plan intended to win over Taliban foot soldiers and low-level commanders. Karzai was hesitant to apply capital punishment during his tenure, signing few death warrants in his presidency, including that of serial killer Abdullah Shah in 2004 and of teenage terrorist Zar Ajam in June 2011. In mid-August 2013, Attorney General Mohammad Ishaq Aloko was said to have been fired after meeting with Taliban officials in the U.A.E. after being told not to meet with them. However, unnamed senior cabinet officials tried to persuade Karzai to not fire him, while an official in Aloko's office denied the dismissal saying instead that he was at the Presidential Palace "celebrating Independence Day".

=== Foreign relations ===
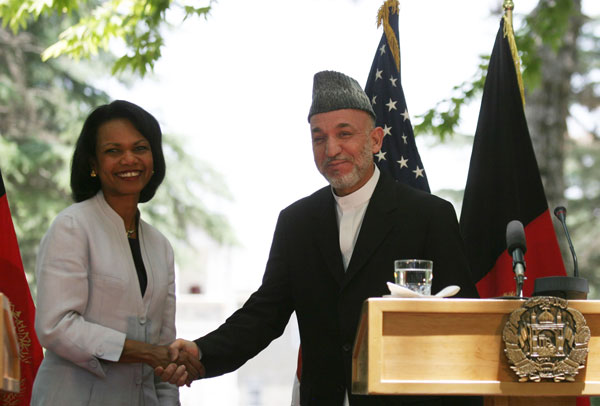
Karzai with U.S. Secretary of State Condoleezza Rice in June 2006.

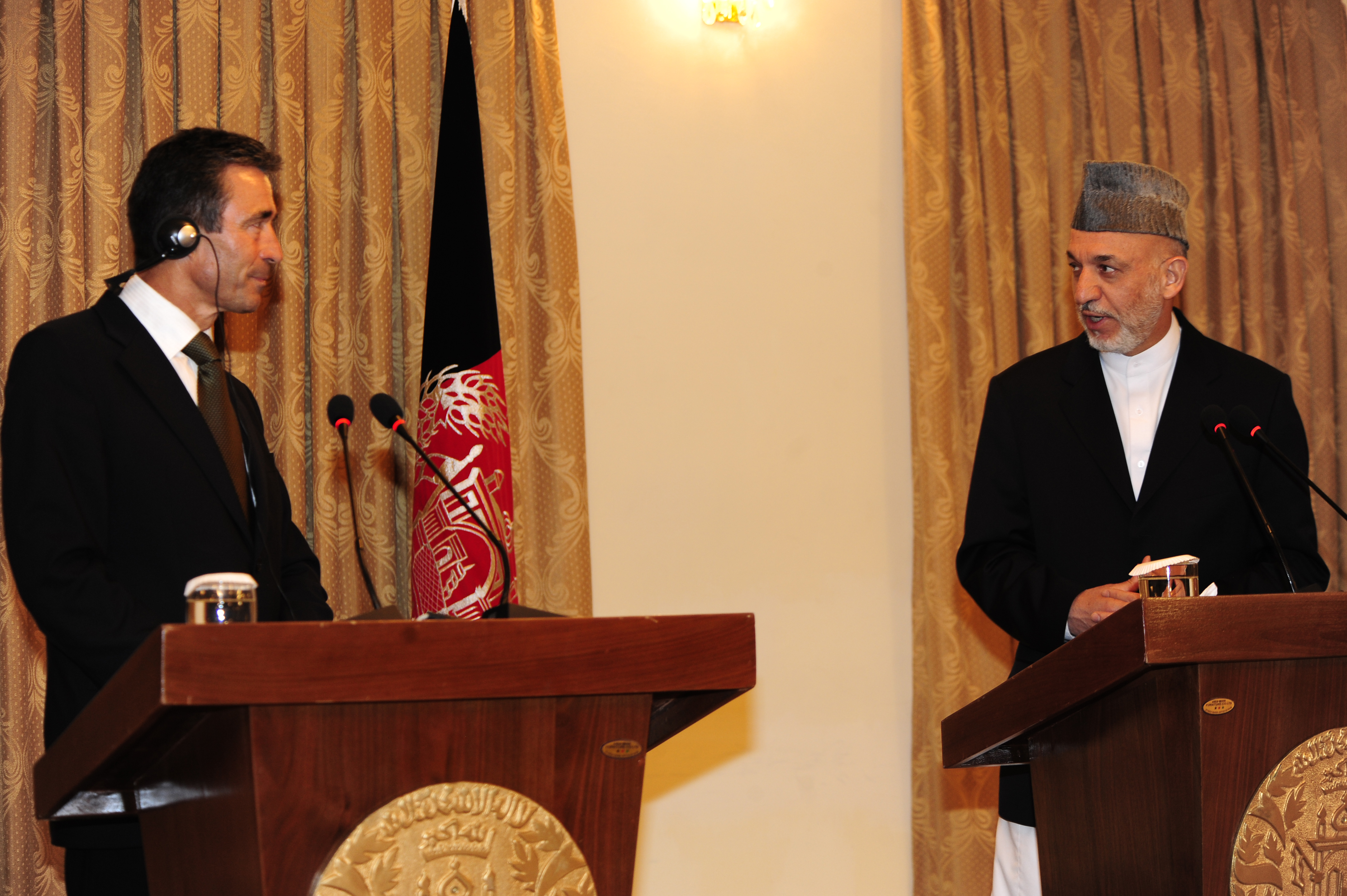
Anders Fogh Rasmussen with Karzai in 2009

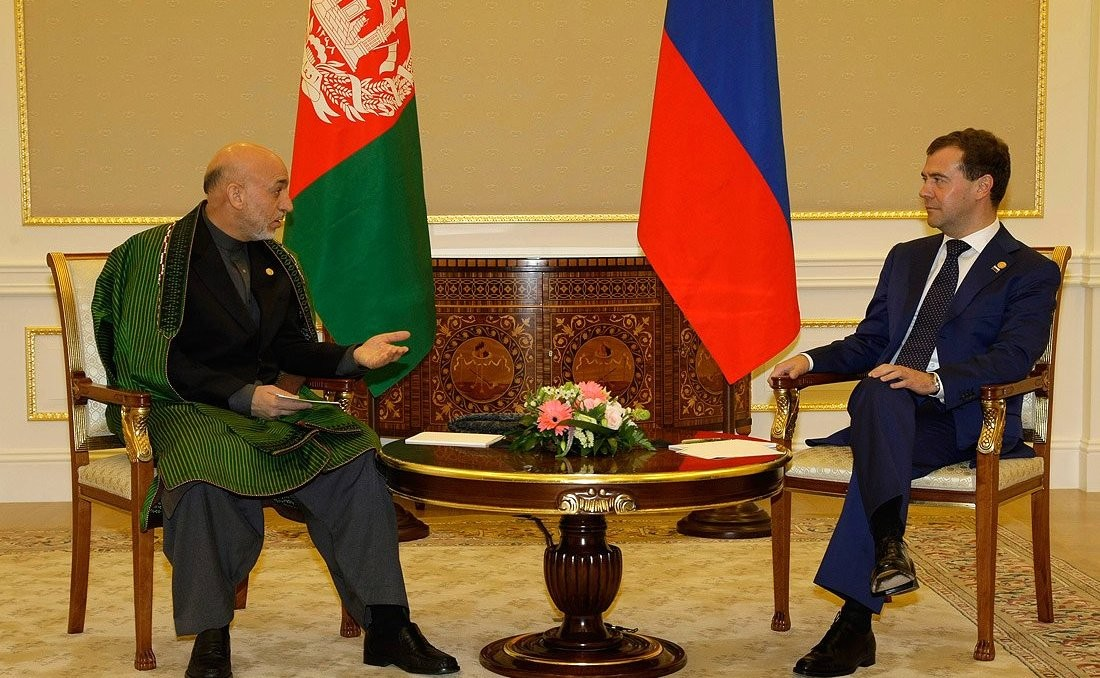
Karzai with Russian President Dmitry Medvedev in 2010

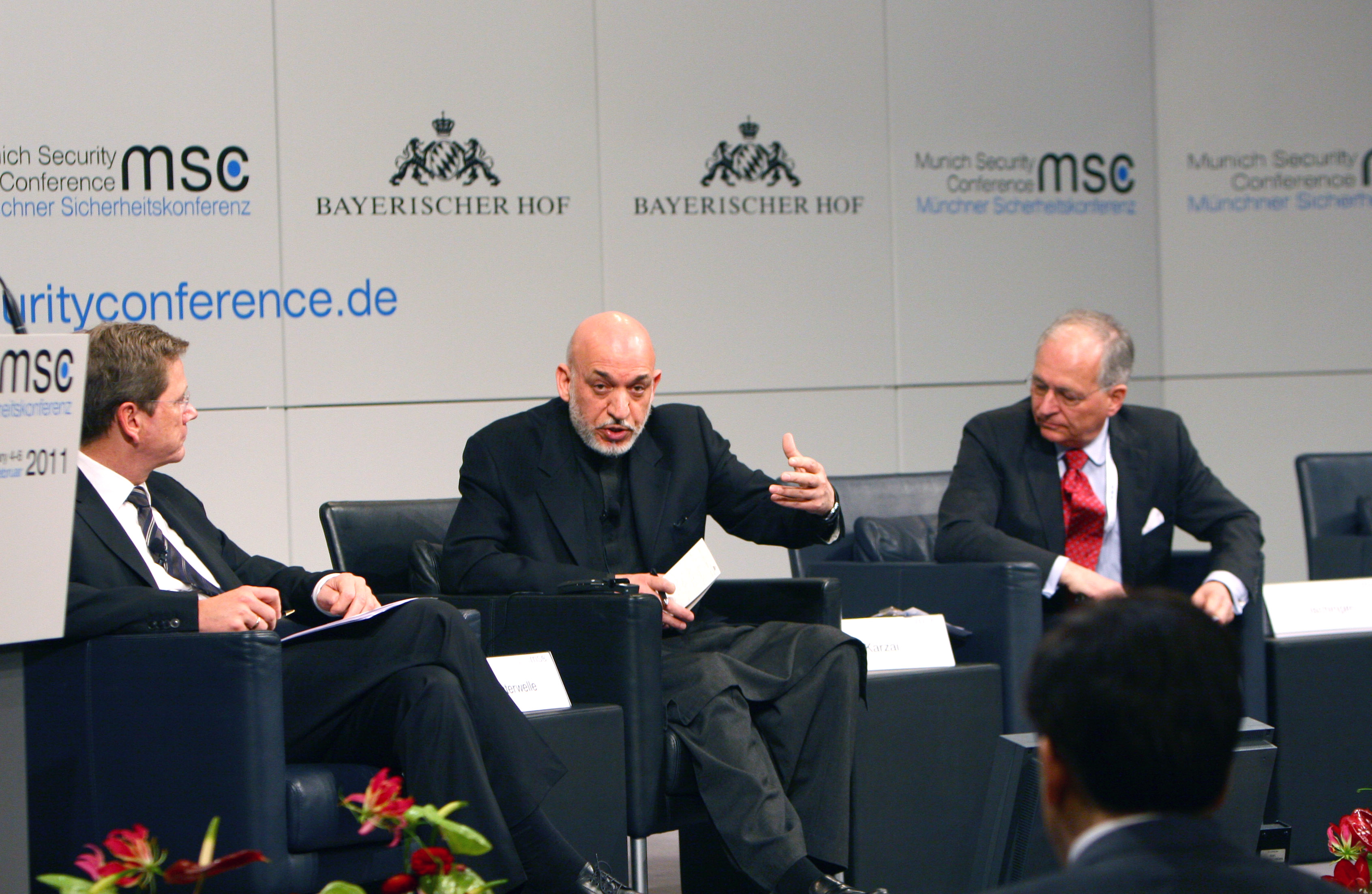
Karzai speaking at the 47th Munich Security Conference in 2011

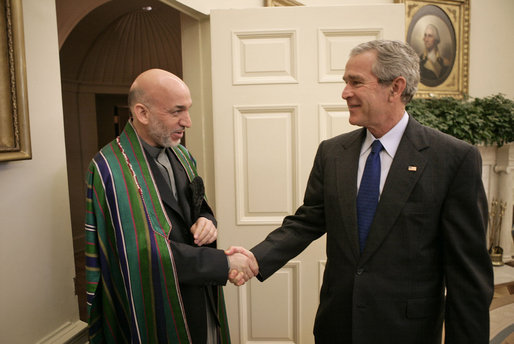
Karzai greeting U.S. President George W. Bush at the White House in 2006

Karzai's relations with NATO countries was strong, especially with the United States, due to the fact that it was the leading nation helping to rebuild war-torn Afghanistan. Karzai enjoyed a very friendly and strong strategic partnership with the United States, despite various disagreements. The U.S. had supported him since late 2001 to lead his nation. He has made many important diplomatic trips to the United States and other NATO countries. In August 2007, Karzai was invited to Camp David in Maryland, USA, for a special meeting with U.S. President George W. Bush. The United States has set up a special envoy for Afghanistan and Pakistan, which is headed by Marc Grossman. His task is to serve as a mediator and solve issues between the three nations.

However, in later years the relations between U.S. and Karzai had become strained, particularly Karzai had been very critical of U.S. military because of their high-level of civilian casualties. In 2019 he described a "major fight" he had with American military officials back in 2007, when Karzai repeatedly told them: "If you want to fight terrorism and bad people, I won't stop you, but please leave the Afghan people alone". In a retrospective interview, Karzai claimed he felt that he was being used as a tool by the United States.

Further strain in relations with the United States resulted in 2014, when Afghanistan, joined Cuba, Nicaragua, North Korea, Syria, and Venezuela as the only countries to recognize the Russian annexation of Crimea. The United States, European countries, and most other nations wholeheartedly condemned the Russian takeover, as well as the validity of the subsequent Crimean Referendum on its annexation to Russia. Citing "the free will of the Crimean people", the office of President Hamid Karzai said, "We respect the decision the people of Crimea took through a recent referendum that considers Crimea as part of the Russian Federation."

Karzai's relations with neighboring Pakistan were generally friendly, especially with the Awami National Party (ANP) and Pakistan Peoples Party (PPP). He often describes his nation and Pakistan as "inseparable twin brothers", a reference to the disputed Durand Line border between the two states, despite the many border skirmishes that occurred during his presidency. In December 2007, Karzai and his delegates traveled to Islamabad, Pakistan, for a usual meeting with Pervez Musharraf on trade ties and intelligence sharing between the two Islamic states. Karzai also met and had a 45-minute talk with Benazir Bhutto on the morning of 27 December, hours before her trip to Liaquat National Bagh, where she was assassinated after her speech. After Bhutto's death, Karzai called her his sister and a brave woman who had a clear vision "for her own country, for Afghanistan, and for the region – a vision of democracy, prosperity, and peace". In September 2008, Karzai was invited on a special visit to witness the swearing-in ceremony of Asif Ali Zardari, who became the President of Pakistan. Relations between Afghanistan and Pakistan have improved after the PPP party took over in 2008. The two nations often make contacts with one another concerning the war on terrorism and trade. Pakistan even allowed NATO forces stationed in Afghanistan to launch attacks on militant groups in Pakistan. This was something strongly opposed by the previous government of Pakistan. The two states finally signed into law long-awaited Afghanistan–Pakistan Transit Trade Agreement in 2011, intended to improve trade. Karzai acknowledges Pakistan's meddling in Afghanistan's wars, but said in a 2015 interview that Afghanistan wants a "friendly relationship but not to be under Pakistan's thumb".

Karzai believed that Iran is a friend although the U.S. often claims that neighboring Iran is meddling in Afghanistan's affairs.

In 2007, Karzai said that Iran, so far, had been a helper in the reconstruction process. He acknowledged in 2010 that the Government of Iran had been providing millions of dollars directly to his office. In October 2007, Karzai again rejected Western accusations against Iran, stating, "We have resisted the negative propaganda launched by foreign states against the Islamic Republic, and we stress that aliens' propaganda should not leave a negative impact on the consolidated ties between the two great nations of Iran and Afghanistan." Karzai added, "The two Iranian and Afghan nations are close to each other due to their bonds and commonalities, they belong to the same house, and they will live alongside each other for good."

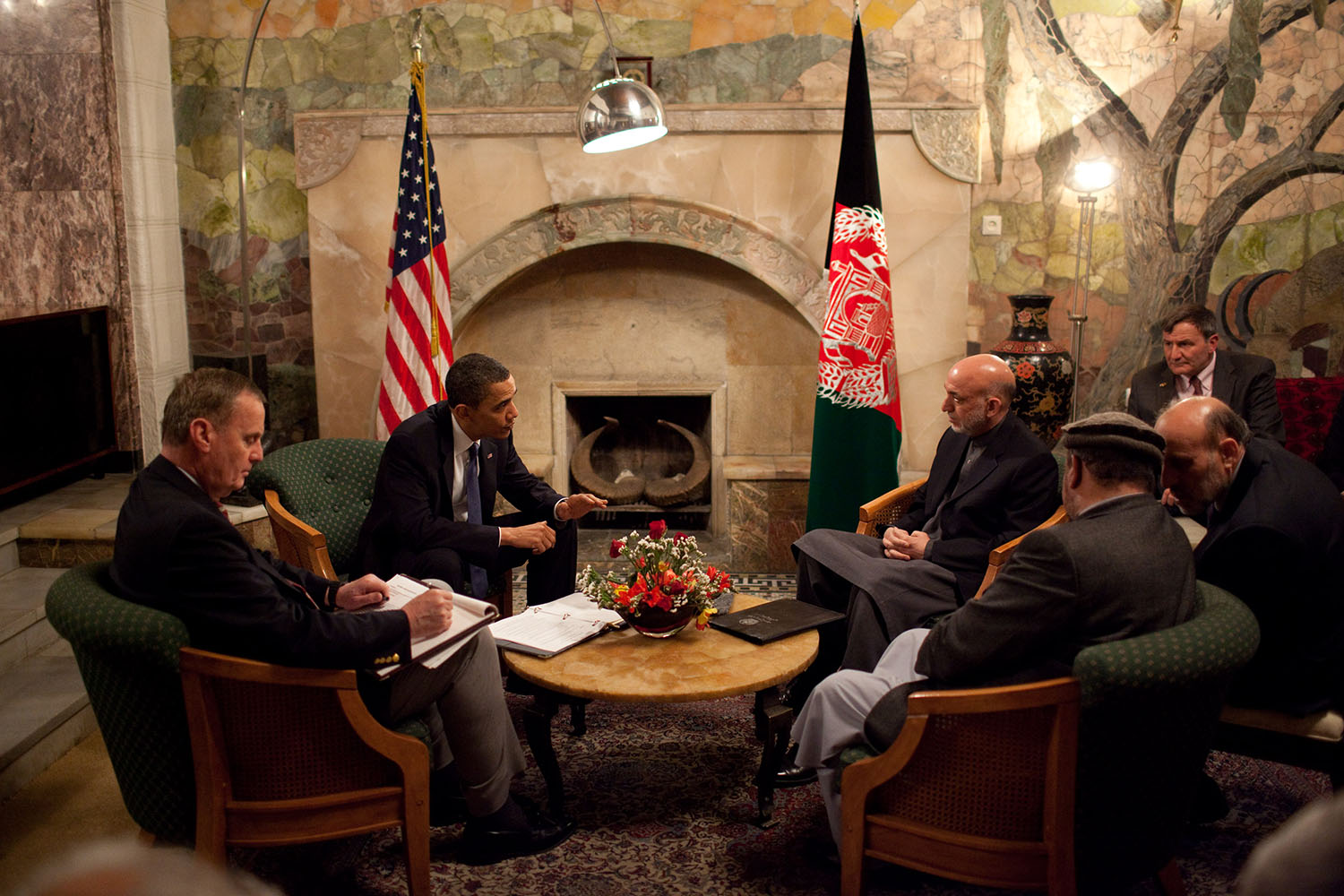
Barack Obama meets with Karzai at the Presidential Palace in Kabul, Afghanistan

Some international criticism has centered around the government of Karzai in early 2009 for failing to secure the country from Taliban attacks, systemic governmental corruption, and widespread claims of electoral fraud in the 2009 Afghan presidential election. Karzai staunchly defended the election balloting, stating that some statements criticizing the balloting and vote count were "totally fabricated". He told the media that, "There were instances of fraud, no doubt ... There were irregularities ... But the election as a whole was good and free and democratic." He further went on to say that, "Afghanistan has its separate problems and we have to handle them as Afghanistan finds it feasible ... This country was completely destroyed ... Today, we are talking about fighting corruption in Afghanistan, improved legal standards ... You see the glass half empty or half full. I see it as half full. Others see it as half empty." A 2019 Washington Post report described Karzai as ruling a "corrupt" government that was tolerated by the United States.

In June 2010, Karzai travelled to Japan for a five-day visit where the two nations discussed a new aid provided by the hosting nation and the untapped mineral resources recently announced. Karzai invited Japanese companies such as Mitsubishi and others to invest in Afghan mining projects. He told Japanese officials that Japan would be given priority in the bid to explore its resources. He stated, "morally, Afghanistan should give access as a priority to those countries that have helped Afghanistan massively in the past few years." While in Japan, Karzai also made his first visit to Hiroshima to pray for the atomic bomb victims. Japan has provided billions of dollars in aid to Afghanistan since the beginning of 2002.

On 16 July 2014, President Karzai held a special cabinet meeting where he condemned the Israeli attacks on Gaza and the killings of civilians while pledging US$500,000 in aid to Gaza.

Relations between Karzai and India were generally friendly; he attended university there. Afghanistan–India relations began getting stronger in 2011, especially after the death of Osama bin Laden in Pakistan. In October 2011, Karzai signed a strategic partnership agreement with Indian Prime Minister Manmohan Singh. During his speech at the RK Mishra Memorial in New Delhi, Karzai told the audience that "The signing of the strategic partnership with India is not directed against any country. It is not directed against any other entity. This is for Afghanistan to benefit from the strength of India."

=== Assassination attempts ===
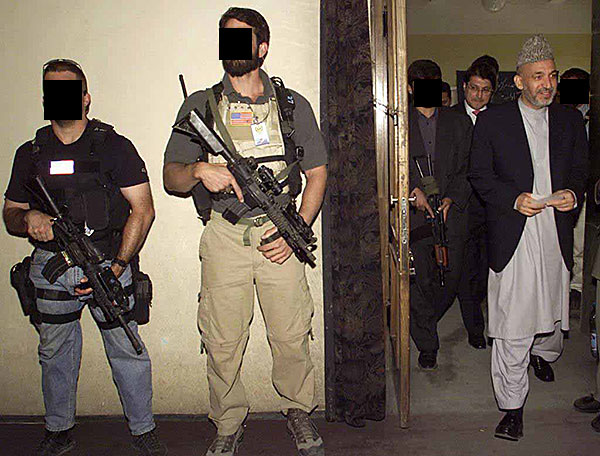
Bodyguards from United States Naval Special Warfare Development Group provide close protection for Karzai.

Many people have plotted to assassinate Karzai, especially the Taliban's Quetta Shura and the Taliban-allied Haqqani network which allegedly receives support and guidance from Pakistan's Inter-Services Intelligence (ISI) spy network. As recent as October 2011, while Karzai was visiting India to sign an important strategic partnership agreement with Indian Prime Minister Manmohan Singh, Afghan agents of the National Directorate of Security (NDS) arrested 6 people in Kabul for planning to assassinate Karzai. Among those involved in the assassination plot were four Kabul University students and one of its professors, Dr. Aimal Habib, as well as Mohibullah Ahmadi who was one of the guards outside the Presidential Palace in Kabul. The alleged group of assassins were associates of al Qaida and the Haqqani network, and were paid $150,000 by Pakistani-based Islamic terrorists. A U.S. official said that "Our understanding is that the threat against President Karzai was real, was credible, but it was only in the early stages of planning." The following is a list of other failed assassination attempts:

- 5 September 2002: An assassination attempt was made on Karzai in the city of Kandahar. A gunman wearing the uniform of the new Afghan National Army opened fire, wounding Gul Agha Sherzai (former governor of Kandahar) and an American Special Operations officer. The gunman, one of the President's bodyguards, and a bystander who knocked down the gunman were killed when Karzai's American bodyguards returned fire. Some pictures of the United States Naval Special Warfare Development Group (DEVGRU) responding to the attempt have surfaced.
- 16 September 2004: An attempted assassination on Karzai took place when a rocket missed the helicopter he was flying in while en route to the city of Gardez in eastern Afghanistan.
- 10 June 2007: Taliban insurgents attempted to assassinate Karzai in Ghazni where he was giving a speech to elders. Insurgents fired approximately 12 rockets, some of which landed 200 metres (220 yd) away from the crowd. Karzai was not hurt in the incident and was transported away from the location after finishing his speech.
- 27 April 2008: Insurgents, reportedly from the Haqqani network, used automatic weapons and rocket-propelled grenades to attack a military parade that Karzai was attending in Kabul. Karzai was safe, but at least three people were killed, including a parliamentarian, a ten-year-old girl and a minority leader, and ten injured. Others attending the event included government ministers, former warlords, diplomats and the military top brass, all of whom had gathered to mark the 16th anniversary of the fall of the Afghan communist government to the mujahideen. Responding to the attack during the ceremony, the UN said the attackers "have shown their utter disrespect for the history and people of Afghanistan". Taliban spokesman Zabiullah Mujahid claimed responsibility for the attack, stating, "We fired rockets at the scene of the celebration." He went on to say there were six Taliban at the scene and that three were killed. "Our aim was not to directly hit someone", Mujahed said when asked if the intention was to kill Karzai. "We just wanted to show to the world that we can attack anywhere we want to". The ability of the attackers to get so close to Karzai suggested they had inside help. Defense minister Wardak confirmed that a police captain was connected with the group behind the assassination attempt and that an army officer supplied the weapons and ammunition used in the attack. Warlord insurgent Gulbuddin Hekmatyar also reportedly claimed responsibility.

== Views on the Taliban ==
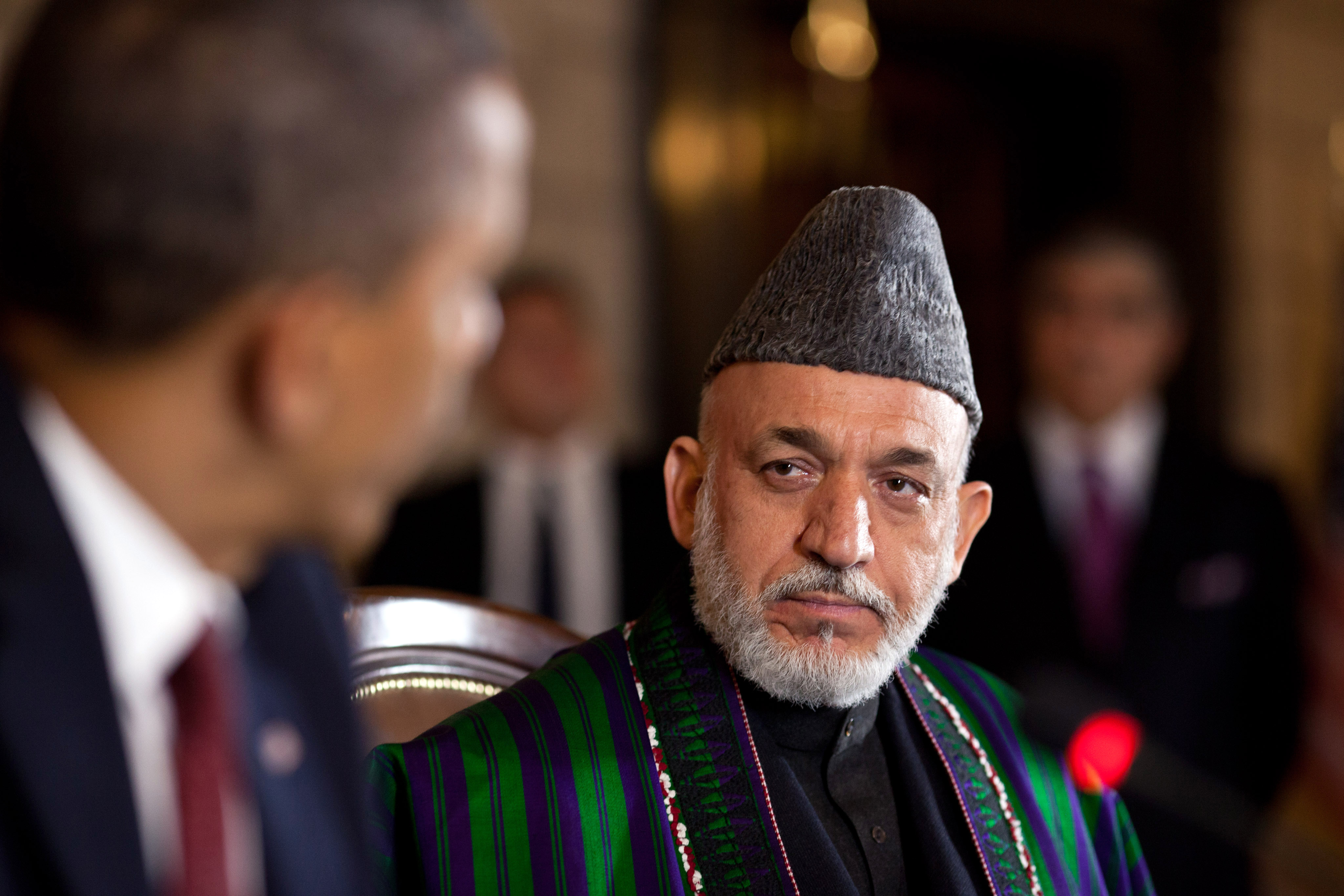
Karzai in 2012

In a 2013 interview with Al Jazeera, Karzai called the Taliban his 'brothers'. He claimed that the Afghan government and Afghan people did not want to eliminate the Taliban, but rather reintegrate the Taliban into society. It was not the first time he called the Taliban his brothers. Previously he called them brothers during his victory speech in 2009, a day after he was declared president.

=== Attack on a Taliban training camp ===
On 14 September 2015, provincial police chief Gen. Daud Ahmadi claimed that Hamid Karzai had stopped an attack on a Taliban training camp in Logar province of Afghanistan. The camp was used as a launching pad and a military operation was being planned to deal with the camp. However, Karzai stopped them from attacking the camp. Ahmadi further claimed there were around 200 militants who were being trained at the camp at that time.

== Post-presidency ==
After the 2017 Nangarhar airstrike, Karzai condemned his successor, President Ashraf Ghani, labeling him a traitor.

Following the fall of the Islamic Republic of Afghanistan to the Taliban on 17 August 2021, the leader of the Taliban-affiliated Hezb-e-Islami party Gulbuddin Hekmatyar met with Karzai and Abdullah Abdullah, chairman of the High Council for National Reconciliation and former chief executive, in Doha, seeking to form an interim government with the Taliban. Unlike many other Afghan government officials who fled the country during the Taliban takeover, Karzai remained in Afghanistan with his family.

In February 2022, Karzai condemned the Biden administration's decision to unfreeze $7 billion of Da Afghanistan Bank's assets and to divide the money between humanitarian aid to Afghanistan and the victims of the attacks on 11 September 2001. Karzai labelled the decision as an "atrocity" and, while saying that Afghans sympathized with the victims of 9/11, the money belonged to the Afghan people, who had also suffered from the attacks' consequences.

Travel restrictions were imposed on Karzai, preventing his departure from Afghanistan despite receiving official invitations from multiple countries. The restrictions reportedly extended to his meetings with foreign delegations, with authorities citing security concerns. In May 2024, sources reported that the travel restrictions had been lifted.

== Personal life and tribal lineage ==
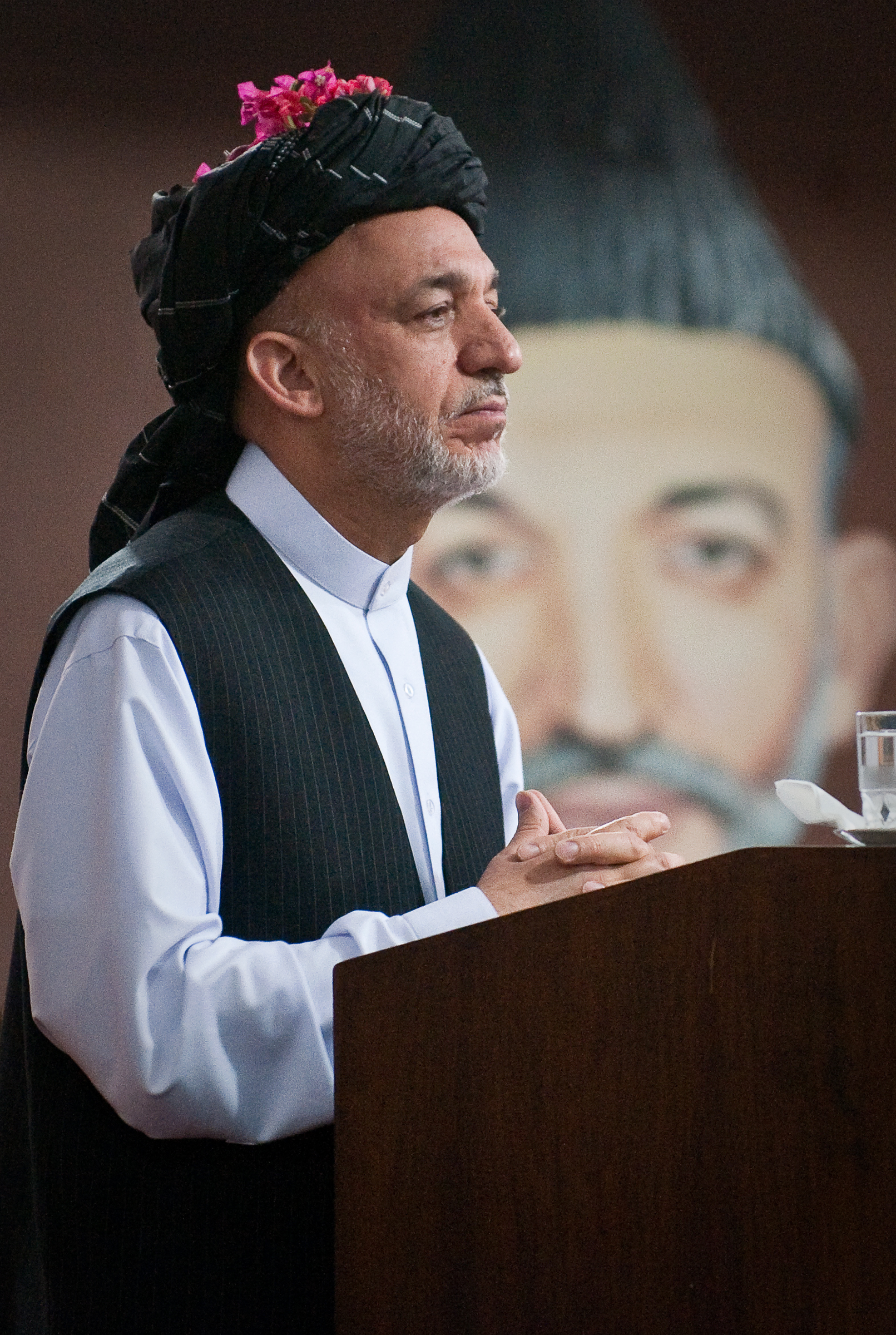
Karzai speaking at a shura to tribal and religious leaders in his native Kandahar, in southern Afghanistan

In 1999, Hamid Karzai married Zeenat Quraishi, a gynaecologist by profession who was working as a doctor with Afghan refugees living in Pakistan. They have a son, Mirwais, who was born in January 2007, a daughter, Malalai, born in 2012 and another daughter, Howsi, born in March 2014 in Gurgaon, India. He became a father once again at the age of 58 when another daughter was born in September 2016 in Apollo Hospital, New Delhi. According to a declaration of his assets by an anti-graft body, Karzai earns $525 monthly and has less than $20,000 in bank accounts. Karzai does not own any land or property.

Karzai has six brothers, including Mahmood Karzai and Qayum Karzai, as well as Ahmed Wali Karzai, deceased, who was the representative for the southern Afghanistan region. Qayum is also the founder of the Afghans for a Civil Society. Karzai has one sister, Fauzia Karzai. The family owns and operates several Afghan restaurants on the East Coast of the United States and in Chicago.

In initial biographical news reporting, there was confusion regarding his clan lineage; it was written that his paternal lineage derived from the Sadduzai clan. This confusion might have arisen from sources stating he was chosen as the tribal chief of the Popalzai. Traditionally, the Popalzai tribe has been led by members of the Sadozais. The first King of Afghanistan, Ahmad Shah Durrani, was the leader of the Sadozais, and the Sadozai lineage continued to rule Afghanistan until 1826 when the Barakzais ascended to the throne.

Karzai is believed to be from the Shamizai subtribe of the Popalzais. His grandfather, Khair Muhammad Karzai, was a head of the Popalzai tribe from Kandahar who relocated to Kabul and ran the business of a guest house. This allowed Karzai's father Abdul Ahad, to gain a foothold in the royal family, and subsequently, the parliament. These actions and upwards movement within the Popalzai tribal system, led to the Karzai family furnishing a viable Shamizai clan alternative to Sadozai leadership in the aftermath of the Soviet invasion when the Sadozai clan failed to provide a tribal leader. He is often seen wearing a Karakul hat, something that has been worn by many Afghan kings in the past.

Following the Fall of Kabul in 2021, Karzai decided to remain in Kabul with his daughters and he appealed to the Taliban to respect his life and that of his family as well as the civilians in Afghanistan.

On 27 August 2021, prominent activist Fatima Gailani criticized him whereas the United States urged the Taliban to include him in the new government along with Abdullah Abdullah.

On 1 September 2021, sources close to the Taliban said that it was "unlikely" for Karzai to be part of the new government, with a spokesperson for the group saying that the group was "ready to recruit them", referring also to Abdullah but added that the Taliban did not want "old horses" in apparent reference to Karzai.

== Honorary degrees and awards ==
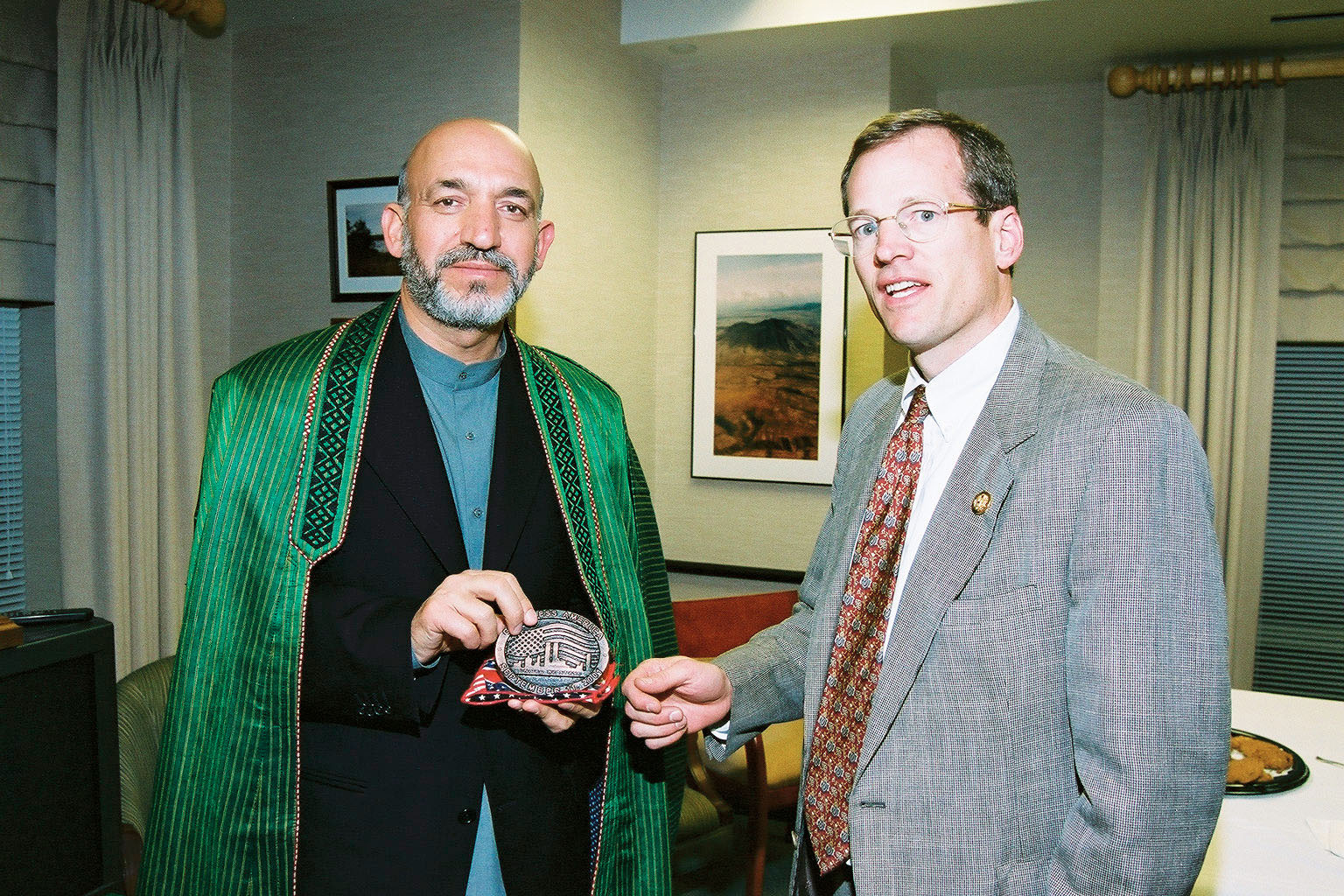
Karzai receiving a commemorative medallion of 11 September 2001 attacks from Jack Kingston. The medallion was forged from steel salvaged from the World Trade Center site

Over the years Hamid Karzai has gained international recognition, receiving awards and honorary degrees from governments and educational institutions, including:

- A commemorative medallion of 11 September 2001 attacks from the United States House of Representatives, presented to him by member of the House Jack Kingston on 29 January 2002.
- On 7 March 2003, Karzai was awarded an honorary doctorate in literature from Himachal Pradesh University in India, his alma mater.
- On 6 June 2003, Karzai was created an Honorary Knight Grand Cross of the Order of St Michael and St George by Queen Elizabeth II.
- On 4 July 2004, Karzai was awarded the Philadelphia Liberty Medal in Philadelphia, Pennsylvania. In his acceptance speech, Karzai stated: "Where Liberty dies, evil grows. We Afghans have learned from our historical experiences that liberty does not come easily. We profoundly appreciate the value of liberty ... for we have paid for it with our lives. And we will defend liberty with our lives."
- On 22 May 2005, he received an honorary Doctor of Laws Degree from Boston University.
- On 25 May 2005, he received an honorary degree from the Center for Afghan Studies at the University of Nebraska at Omaha.
- On 25 September 2006, he received an honorary Doctor of Laws Degree from Georgetown University.
- In June 2012, he received an honorary Doctorate from Nippon Sport Science University.
- Lovely Professional University conferred an honorary Doctorate on Karzai on 20 May 2013.

== Controversies ==
In August 2011, Karzai pardoned dozens of children, the youngest of whom was 8 years old, who were caught attempting suicide bombing. In February 2012, two boys among those pardoned were rearrested in Kandahar Province along with three adult militant suspects, and that they told intelligence officers they had been recruited for suicide missions.

Karzai has been accused of nepotism, corruption, electoral fraud, and being involved with his late half brother Ahmed Wali Karzai in the drug trade.

In 2009, Karzai antagonized the women's movement and NATO leaders by signing a draconian Shia Personal Status Law seen as legalizing marital rape within Afghanistan's minority Shia Muslim community.

=== Electoral fraud ===
Under Karzai's administration, electoral fraud was so apparent that Afghanistan's status as a democratic state came into question. Furthermore, a special court set up personally by Karzai in defiance of constitutional norms sought to reinstate dozens of candidates who were removed for fraud in the 2010 parliamentary elections by the Independent Electoral Commission.

=== Financial ties with CIA and the government of Iran ===
On 28 April 2013, The New York Times revealed that from December 2002 up to the publication date, Karzai's presidential office was funded with "tens of millions of dollars" of black cash from the CIA in order to buy influence within the Afghan government. The article stated that the cash "does not appear to be subject to the oversight and restrictions." An unnamed American official was quoted by The New York Times as stating that "The biggest source of corruption in Afghanistan was the United States."

On 17 June 2013, Senator Bob Corker put a hold on $75 million intended for electoral programs in Afghanistan after his inquiries of 2 May 14 May and 13 June to the Obama Administration regarding the CIA "ghost money" remained unanswered.

Karzai also admitted that his office received millions of dollars in cash from the Iranian government. Karzai stated that the money was given as gifts and intended for renovating his Presidential Palace in Kabul. "This is transparent. This is something that I've even discussed while I was at Camp David with President Bush."

=== Corruption ===
According to The New York Times, many members of the Karzai family have mixed their personal interests with those of the state and become hugely influential and wealthy by murky means. In 2012 Afghanistan was tied with Somalia and North Korea at the bottom of Transparency International's Corruption Perception Index,, and in 2014 it ranked 172nd out of 175.

Mahmoud Karzai, the brother of President Karzai, was implicated in the 2010 Kabul Bank crisis. Mahmud Karzai was the 3rd largest shareholder in the bank with a 7% stake. Kabul Bank incurred huge losses on its investments in villas in Palm Jumeirah in Dubai. The real estate investments were registered in the name of Kabul Bank chairman Sherkhan Farnood. Mahmud Karzai bought one such villa from Farnood for 7 million dirhams using money borrowed from Kabul Bank and in a matter of months sold it for 10.4 million dirhams. Mahmud Karzai's purchase of the 7% stake in Kabul Bank was also financed entirely through money lent by Kabul Bank with the shares as collateral.

Karzai has admitted that there is widespread corruption in Afghanistan, but has blamed the problem largely on the way contracts are awarded by the international community, and said that the "perception of corruption" is a deliberate attempt to weaken the Afghan government.

=== Unocal connection ===
There has been much debate over Karzai's alleged consultant work with Unocal (Union Oil Company of California, acquired by Chevron in 2005). In 2002, when Karzai became the subject of heavy media coverage as one of the frontrunners to lead Afghanistan, it was reported that he was a former consultant for them. Spokesmen for both Unocal and Karzai have denied any such relationship, although Unocal could not speak for all companies involved in the consortium. The original claim that Karzai worked for Unocal originates from a 6 December 2001 issue of the French newspaper Le Monde,

Barry Lane, UNOCAL's manager for public relations, stated in an interview on the website Emperor's Clothes, "He was never a consultant, never an employee. We've exhaustively searched through all our records." Lane did, however, say that Zalmay Khalilzad, the former United States Ambassador to the United Nations, was a Unocal consultant in the mid-1990s.

=== Communication with Taliban ===
In October 2013, Karzai's administration and the Afghan Intelligence agency were found to be communicating with the Pakistani Taliban about the shifting of power that was expected to occur if the U.S. forces withdrew in 2014. Karzai himself was in London at the time of the discovery, to participate in talks with Pakistan and the U.S. on the possible location of Taliban leader Mullah Baradar. At the time, it was unknown if Karzai was directly involved or even knew of such communications.

In May 2021, Karzai spoke with German newspaper Der Spiegel, where he expressed his sympathy with the Taliban, criticized the role of the United States in Afghanistan, and praised the role of the European Union, at the same time saying that the future of Afghanistan relied heavily on neighboring Pakistan. He also considered the Taliban "victims of foreign forces" and said that Afghans were being manipulated to be "each against the other". In November 2021, he told Yalda Hakim of BBC News that he considered the Taliban "brothers".

=== View on ISIS in Afghanistan ===
Karzai, during an interview with Voice of America in April 2017, claimed that ISIS in Afghanistan was a tool for the United States. He further claimed that he did not differentiate at all between ISIS and the United States.

During an interview with Fox News a few weeks later, Karzai claimed that ISIS in Afghanistan was a product of the United States. He claimed that he routinely received reports regarding unmarked helicopters dropping supplies to support the terror faction. He asked for an explanation from the United States regarding the unmarked helicopter flights. He also claimed that the United States had made Afghanistan a testing ground for its weapons.

In November 2017, during an interview with Al Jazeera, Karzai again criticized the United States. He accused the United States of working with ISIS in Afghanistan. Moreover, he said that the United States government had allowed ISIS to flourish in Afghanistan and had used ISIS as an excuse to drop the GBU-43 (Mother of all Bombs) in Afghanistan.

Karzai also accused Pakistan of supporting ISIS during an interview with ANI.

== In popular culture ==
- In the film War Machine, Karzai was portrayed by Ben Kingsley.

== See also ==
- List of heads of state of Afghanistan
- Politics of Afghanistan
- Mahmoud Karzai
- Ahmed Wali Karzai
- Kabul Bank crisis
- Afghan Peace Jirga 2010
- Hamid Karzai International Airport

== Books/Articles ==
- Dam, Bette. A Man and a Motorcycle, Ipso Facto Publ., Sept. 2014.
- Dam, Bette. "The Misunderstanding of Hamid Karzai", Foreign Policy, October 3, 2014.
- Partlow, Joshua (2016). A Kingdom of Their Own: The Family Karzai and the Afghan Disaster. Knopf. ISBN 978-0307962645.

Political offices
Preceded by Burhanuddin Rabbani	4th President of Afghanistan; 2002–2014	Succeeded by Ashraf Ghani
