= Mahmud Karzai =

Afghan businessman

Mahmood Karzai (Pashto: محمود کرزی) also spelled Mahmud Karzai, or Mahmoud Karzai (born 1957) is an Afghan businessman. He was the third of the six children and son of a prominent political figure, Abdul Ahad Karzai who was a member of the Afghan National Assembly during King Zahir Shah's time. Mahmood Karzai is currently the Chairman and President of the AFCO International LLC. He is the elder brother of the former president of Afghanistan, Hamid Karzai and he is also the brother of Ahmed Wali Karzai, a politician in Afghanistan who served as Chairman of the Kandahar Provincial Council and was killed by his bodyguard in Afghanistan.

== Early life and education ==
In 1973, Mohammad Daoud Khan overthrew Abdul Ahad's first cousin His Majesty Mohammad Zahir Shah in coup d'état and declared himself as president of Afghanistan. Since Mahmood's father was a close aide of The King, Mohammad Daoud Khan removed many prominent members of the Karzai family from the government. Worrying about the safety of his family, Abdul Ahad advised his son to leave for America till the current political storm would calm down.

Mahmood Karzai left for the United States in February 1976, where he attended Montgomery College in Montgomery County, Maryland to pursue his education in computer science. During this time, the communist government of Afghanistan seized all of Karzai family's assets leaving them vulnerable. Soon after, Mahmood chose to drop out of college to fully pursue his entrepreneurial ambitions.

== Entrepreneurial career ==
=== America ===
Mahmood was working two jobs from 1977 till 1983 and managed to save $60,000 which he invested in establishing a restaurant called "The Helmand" in Chicago in the year 1985. Seeing that there is a market opportunity for Afghan cuisine and the local's appetite to try new cuisines, 'The Helmand' was an instant success.

After the initial success of 'The Helmand' restaurant, Mahmood decided to turn this new venture into a chain of restaurants. A couple of years after the opening of the first branch, Mahmood traveled to San Francisco. The second restaurant was also met with immense success and later in October 1994, Mahmood opened his final chain of 'The Helmand' restaurants in Cambridge Massachusetts.

In the year 1996, Mahmood Karzai saw an upcoming trend of Mexican food becoming popular in America. Seeing this opportunity in the market, Mahmood Karzai opened his first Tex-Mex Grill called 'Viva Burrito' in Boston, MA.

His final investment in the restaurant business was when he opened a Mexican restaurant in Maryland called 'Tampico Mexican Grill'.

=== Afghanistan ===
After the fall of the Taliban, Mahmood travelled back and forth to Afghanistan frequently. Seeing the current business environment in Afghanistan, Mahmood decided to spend the majority of his time trying to rebuild his home country. Because of his constant and prolonged travel to Afghanistan, Mahmood had to sell his restaurant chains in the US and use the funds from the sale to start-up new businesses in Afghanistan.

==== ACCI (Afghan Chamber of Commerce and Industries) ====
Mahmood noticed a lack of representation for the business community in Afghanistan. To address this issue, Mahmood started working on the formation of Afghanistan Chambers of Commerce & Industry (ACCI). The sole purpose of this organization was to forward the concerns of private investors, entrepreneurs, and other businesses, to the government and other relevant authorities to make the businesses thrive. Mahmood believed that for the chamber of commerce to function efficiently it had to be an independent entity based on memberships, election, and without the government's intervention. Therefore, Mahmood and a group of Afghan entrepreneurs proposed USAID and the Afghan government in [2003] to reestablish this organization under the name of Afghanistan Chamber of Commerce and Industries (ACCI). Which later became an independent organization, which promotes domestic production and trade in all provinces. Currently, ACCI has more than 65,000 business members, 255 business unions, and several associations and cooperatives. ACCI advocates for the interest of the business community and supports the free market economy and free trade in Afghanistan.

==== Kabul Bank ====
Mahmood Karzai was a shareholder in Kabul Bank, owning 20,548 shares, which represents 7.41% of the bank. Kabul Bank faced a big crisis in the year 2011 in which the Chairman and the CEO of the Bank were found to be involved in 'Ponzi Scheme'. The bank was bailed out from Collapsing in 2011 and was renamed as New Kabul Bank. All the shares of the bank were dissolved and it was nationalised soon after the bailout.

==== Toyota dealership ====
In the year 2006, Mahmmod Karzai along with Habib Gulzar, another Afghan entrepreneur, opened the first official Toyota dealership in Afghanistan. Afghanistan's automotive sales industry primarily consisted of new or used cars imported either by individuals or small businesses. Spare parts and service for the local cars were carried out by untrained local mechanics who lack the tools to carry out proper maintenance and repairs of the vehicles. The business paved the way for other Afghan entrepreneurs to bring in motor dealerships and even though the Toyota dealership grew gradually, Mahmood Karzai sold his shares to his partner Habib Gulzar.

==== Afghanistan investment company & purchase of "Ghori Cement" ====
Mahmood saw the cement industry of Afghanistan in disarray and inoperable. He planned on making Afghanistan's first and only cement production plant operational again so that it could help in the development of the country.

As Mahmmod was an integral part of the Afghan Chamber of Commerce and Industries (ACCI), he informed all the businessmen about the importance of having a local cement production plant "Ghori Cement", and Mahmood tried to raise capital by appealing to those businessmen. Mahmmod succeeded in his effort and was able to raise $25 Million from the businessmen in ACCI.

The funds were transferred into a newly formed company 'Afghanistan Investment Company' (AIC). Because the company was established with the help of some Afghan businessmen, a board of directors was created in which each of the shareholders had a seat. During the initial meeting, the shareholders decided to elect Mahmood Karzai as the CEO of AIC. Mahmmod Karzai used the funds to invest in the factory to make it operational and to increase its production. After a couple of years of successfully leading AIC towards progress and profitability, Mahmood resigned as the CEO of 'AIC' to pursue his other goals.

==== Ayno Maina ====
In the year 2003, Mahmood had the idea to build a city with all modern amenities including, sewer lines, clean water network, new electricity, and a communication system. These amenities also included paved roads, sidewalks, clinic/hospitals, schools, a university & public parks. Mahmood named this new real estate project "Ayno Maina.". Building a city with the size of Ayno Maina required a considerable amount of capital investment to start the planning and design phase of the town. Mahmood worked on a business plan in which he wrote where this new city will be built and how many apartments it will have and what facilities will it offer for its residents. Mahmood used his contacts at ACCI and his other friends to gather support to finance the first stage of this new development. One of the institutions to which Mahmood submitted his business plan was the Overseas Private Investment Corporation (OPIC) which is the United States government's development finance institution.

After reviewing the business plan and all the relevant documents attached with it, OPIC approved the finance of $3 Million to start the initial stage of building this new city. This capital would be used to draw a complete map of the town including the designs of the apartments and the rooms inside it, sewage system, clean water network, electricity distribution grid and many other necessities that are readily available in any well-developed country.

== Controversies and scandals ==
=== IRS (Internal Revenue Service) ===
In October 2010, the Washington Post reported that Karzai could soon be indicted for tax evasion in the U.S., by the Internal Revenue Service though he is aware of the investigation, telling the newspaper: "I'm giving any charges", and insisting his only interest is "rebuilding Afghanistan." To date, no charges have been brought against Karzai.

In 2011, investigative reporters reported that Karzai was under review by a U.S. grand jury for alleged racketeering, extortion and tax evasion. He reportedly hired a Washington, D.C.-based criminal defense attorney as a result of the grand jury investigation.

=== Kabul Bank ===
Mahmood Karzai is closely tied to the Kabul Bank scandal and other controversies. As a 7% shareholder and being the elder brother of the ex-president Hamid Karzai, Mahmood's involvement drew criticism from everywhere. The Washington Post and other investigative newspapers reported about the Kabul Bank scandal and Mahmood Karzai's role as shareholder of the bank. The newspaper also reported on the freezing of the Bank's assets in 2010. During the September 2010 run on the bank Mahmood Karzai reportedly told the Boston Globe that "America should do something."

=== American citizenship ===
In 2013, Karzai, who has resided in Afghanistan since 2002, renounced his American citizenship to assume a bigger role in Afghan politics. The move was perceived as Mahmood expressing interest in running in the 2014 Presidential Election.

=== Ghori Cement scandal ===
the Ghori Cement Factory, which investigative news reporters have found to have a host of troubling issues involving alleged corruption, cronyism, insider dealings involving the Kabul Bank scandal, unsafe working conditions and very low wages ($3 per day in 2010). Independent news reporters have raised serious questions about the link between Mahood Karzai and his elder brother, President Hamid Karzai, especially as they relate to the cement factory scandal and alleged questionable ties between Karzai family, and public, finances.
