= Satellite Town =

Satellite Town or Satellite City may refer to:

- Satellite city, a concept of urban planning
- Satellite City, a 1994 Welsh sitcom
- Satellite Town, Lagos, Nigeria
- Satellite Town, Chiniot, Pakistan
- Satellite Town, Gujranwala, Pakistan
- Satellite Town, Jhang, Pakistan
- Satellite Town, Quetta, Pakistan
- Satellite Town, Rawalpindi, Pakistan
- Satellite Town Ring Road, Bangalore, India
