= Qazi Amin Waqad =

Afghan politician (1947–2021)

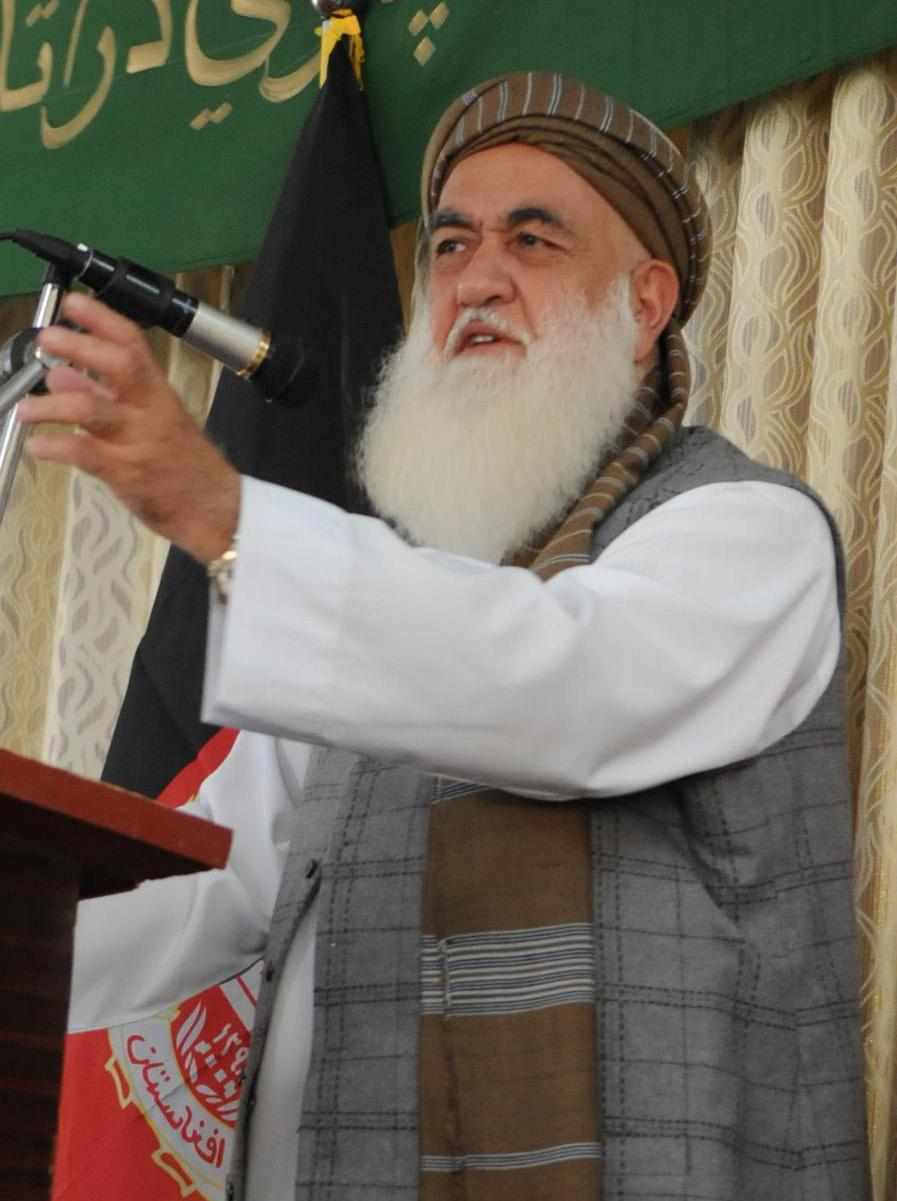
Qazi Amin Waqad in May 2011

Qazi Muhammad Amin Waqad (1947 – June 14, 2021) was an Afghan politician who has held a variety of political and military offices.

An ethnic Mohmand Pashtun from Nangrahar Province, Qazi Amin attended a madrasah in Pakistan, before graduating at the Islamic Law Faculty of Kabul University. While at university, he became an active member of the Islamist Muslim Youth movement. In 1975, following the repression of the Islamist movement by Daoud Khan, Qazi Amin escaped to Peshawar. During the late 1970s and early 1980s he served several times as leader of Hezbi Islami Gulbuddin, though he was more often deputy leader to Gulbuddin Hekmatyar. In 1985, he quit HIG and founded his own party, which had only a limited influence. After the fall of the Democratic Republic of Afghanistan in 1992, he held an appointment as Minister of Communications from 1994 to 1997.

Later, he became a leading member of the National Front, a political party opposed to the Karzai administration.

Since the U.S. led invasion of Afghanistan, Waqad has faced unsuccessful assassination attempts on his life by the Taliban, including one in 2017.

Waqad died on June 14, 2021.
