= Mohammad Panah =

Military personnel

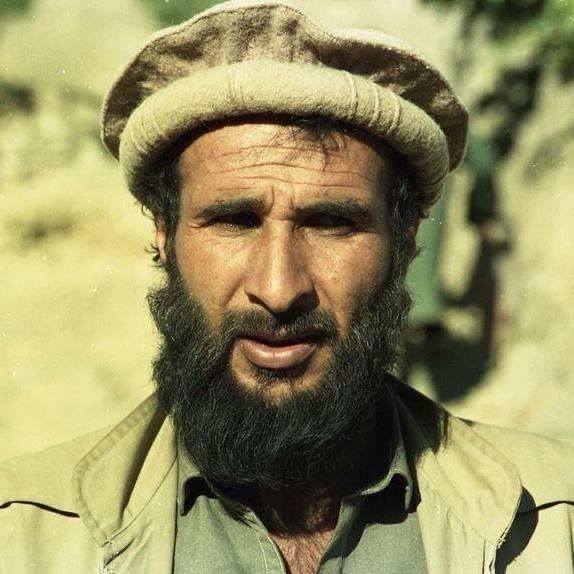

Personal details
- Born: 11 January 1957 Safidchehr Village, Panjsher Province
- Died: 15 March 1995 (aged 38) Paghman Valley, Kabul Province
- Party: Jamiat-E-Islami
- Occupation: Military commander
- Ethnicity: Tajik
- Religion: Sunni Islam

Military service
- Years of service: 25
- Rank: Lieutenant General
- Battles/wars: Afghan Civil War (1992–1996) Soviet–Afghan War

General Mohammad Panah was an Afghan military commander who was loyal to Ahmad Shah Massoud. Panah was famous for successfully fighting Soviet incursions in the Panjsher Valley and other northern areas of Afghanistan. Following the withdrawal of USSR forces from Afghanistan and the subsequent collapse of the Communist regime in Kabul, Panah fought Hezb-e-islami and the Taliban. He was killed in Paghman District during a Taliban offensive in Kabul.

== Early years ==
Mohammad Panah was born in Safidchechr, Panjshir province, he studied religion in his home village. He joined Massoud early on and quickly climbed the ranks, he was involved with operations in Panjshir, Salang, Takhar, Baghlan, Parwan, and Kapisa against the Soviet Union.

== Military career ==
He was appointed as a senior general and played a prominent and decisive role in repelling invasions from the Red Army in Panjshir.

At the height of the Red Army's bloody attacks on the Panjshir Valley, Mohammad Panah commanded the Chamalwarde camp, which was one of the most important bases for the Mujahideen. He was responsible for inflicting crushing blows on the Soviets.

Mohammad Panah was appointed as the commander of Salang, he planned and carried out several operations and confrontational attacks against the invading Soviet forces. With the forces under his command, he destroyed hundreds of vehicles, enemy armor, and weapons, captured hundreds of weapons of the aggressors, and took dozens of Soviet officers and soldiers prisoner.

Mohammad Panah's accomplishments in the Salang Valley became popular among the Afghan people and became a sign of the bravery of the Mujahideen across the country. The heavy blows of General Panah and the forces under his command on the soldiers of the Red Army caused the Afghan Communist Government to sentence Panah to death in absentia.

In 1364, General Mohammad Panah went to Baghlan Province for planning and carrying out attacks on the aggressor and puppet forces of the Soviet Union. He established his command centre in the mountainous areas of Nahrin and, for a year in that province, he was busy directing and managing the Mujahideen forces.

General Panah played a prominent and decisive role in the conquests of the Farkhar Garrison, the Kalfgan Garrison, the Nahrin Sect, the conquest of Taloqan, the capital of Takhar Province, and several other guerrilla operations in the northern parts of the country.

After the expulsion of the Red Army from the country and the expansion of the areas under the control of the Mujahideen, General Panah was appointed as the commander of the first unit of the central formation of the Islamic State of Afghanistan, taking Takhar and Kunduz soon after.

Panah played a key and decisive role in the victory for the Afghan Mujahideen against the Democratic Republic of Afghanistan. After capturing the districts of Jabal Siraj, Charikar, and Bagram, he entered Kabul as the first commander of the Mujahideen, playing an important role in the process.

Panah was involved in the power struggle that engulfed Kabul, fighting against rival factions for control of the city, eventually dying in combat to the Taliban in 1995.

== See also ==
- Ahmad Shah Massoud
- Qasim Fahim
- Ahmad Massoud
- Hasib Qoway Markaz
- Burhanuddin Rabbani
