= Mawlawi Mir Hamza =

Mawlawi Mawlawi Mir Hamza
- مولوی میر حمزه

Vice President of Afghanistan
- In office August 1992 – 12 January 1993
- President: Burhanuddin Rabbani
- Preceded by: Abdul Rasul Sayyaf
- Succeeded by: Mohammad Shah Fazli

Personal details
- Born: c. 1943-1944
- Died: 12 January 1993 (aged 50) Peshawar, Pakistan
- Political party: Jamiat-e Islami

Mawlawi Mir Hamza was an islamist politician from Afghanistan who served as Vice President of Afghanistan in Mujahideen government in 1990s.

He was born ca 1943-1944. He was a Mawlawi from a madrasa. He became a member of Jamiat-e Islami in 1969. He was Minister of Education in the Pakistani-located mujahideen government of Ahmad Shah Ahmadzai in 1988. He was chosen as Vice President of Burhanuddin Rabbani in 1992. He died in office on 12 January 1993 at the age of 50, in a hospital in Peshawar, Pakistan.
