= United National Front =

United National Front may refer to:

- United National Front (Afghanistan)
- United National Front (Pakistan)
- United National Front (Sri Lanka)
- United National Front (Singapore), a political party in Singapore
