= Islamic State of Afghanistan =

Afghan state from 1992 to 2002

Coordinates: 37°7′03″N 70°34′47″E

Islamic State of Afghanistan: د افغانستان اسلامي دولت (Pashto) Də Afğānistān Islāmi Daulat; دولت اسلامی افغانستان (Dari) Dawlat-i Islāmī-yi Afġānistān
- 1992–1996; 1996–2001: in Northern Alliance zone only 2001–2002
- Flag (Note: Both orientations were used due to lack of standardization.) Emblem
- Motto: لا إله إلا الله محمد رسول الله lā ʾilāha ʾillà l-Lāh, Muḥammadun rasūlu l-Lāh "There is no god except Allah, Muhammad is the messenger of Allah"
- Anthem: قلعه اسلام قلب اسیا "Fortress of Islam, Heart of Asia" (1992–1999; 2002)
- Status: Government-in-exile controlling a rump state (1996–2001)
- Capital: Kabul ('1992–1996, 2001–2002)
- Capital-in-exile: Taloqan (1996–2000); Fayzabad (2000–2001)
- Official languages: Dari and Pashto
- Religion: Islam (official)
- Demonym: Afghan
- Government: Unitary semi-presidential Islamic state
- President
  - 1992 (acting): Sibghatullah Mojaddedi
  - 1992–2001: Burhanuddin Rabbani
  - 2001–2002 (acting): Hamid Karzai
- Vice President
  - 1992: Abdul Rasul Sayyaf
  - 1992–1993: Mawlawi Mir Hamza
  - 1993–1994: Mohammad Shah Fazli
  - 1993–1996: Mohammad Nabi Mohammadi
- Prime Minister
  - 1992: Abdul Kohistani
  - 1993–1994: Gulbuddin Hekmatyar
  - 1994–1995 (acting): Arsala Rahmani Daulat
  - 1995–1996 (acting): Ahmad Shah Ahmadzai
  - 1996–1997: Gulbuddin Hekmatyar
  - 1997: Abdul Rahim Ghafoorzai
- Historical era: Afghan conflict
  - Peshawar Accords: 24 April 1992
  - State proclaimed: 28 April 1992
  - Taliban capture Kabul: 27 September 1996
  - Northern Alliance: 1996–2001
  - American invasion: 7 October 2001
  - Kabul retaken: 13 November 2001
  - Transitional Islamic State of Afghanistan established: 19 June 2002
- Currency: Afghani (AFN)
- Calling code: +93
- ISO 3166 code: AF
Preceded by
1992: Republic of Afghanistan
1992: Afghan Interim; Government
2001: Islamic Emirate of Afghanistan
Succeeded by
1996: Islamic Emirate of Afghanistan
2002: Transitional Islamic; State of Afghanistan

The Islamic State of Afghanistan (Dari: دولت اسلامی افغانستان, Dawlat-i Islāmī-yi Afġānistān, Pashto: دا افغانستان اسلامی دولت, Da Afghanistan Islami Dowlat) was a unitary Islamic state that was established in April 1992 under the Peshawar Accord. Its power was limited due to the country's second civil war, which was won by the Taliban, who seized Kabul in September 1996. The Islamic state then transitioned to a government-in-exile and led the anti-Taliban Northern Alliance. It remained the internationally recognized government of Afghanistan at the United Nations until 2001, when the Transitional Islamic State of Afghanistan was created and an Afghan Interim Administration took control of Afghanistan with US and NATO assistance following the overthrow of the first Taliban government. The Transitional Islamic State was subsequently transformed into the Islamic Republic, which existed until the Taliban seized power again in 2021 following a prolonged insurgency.

== Background ==
In March 1992, President Mohammad Najibullah, having lost the Russian support that upheld his government, agreed to resign and make way for a neutral, interim government. Several mujahideen parties started negotiations to form a national coalition government. But one group, the Hezb-e Islami led by Gulbuddin Hekmatyar, presumably supported and directed by Pakistan's Inter-Services Intelligence (ISI), did not join the negotiations and announced its intent to conquer Kabul alone. Hekmatyar moved his troops to Kabul, and was allowed into the town soon after 17 April. This left the other mujahideen groups no choice but to enter Kabul, on 24 April, to prevent Hekmatyar from taking over national government.
This ignited a civil war between five or six rival armies, (nearly) all backed by foreign states. Several mujahideen groups proclaimed an 'interim government' on 26 April 1992 but this never attained real authority over Afghanistan. Many Afghan mujahideen parties participated in its creation, after the fall of the socialist government.

== History ==
=== Rabbani and Hekmatyar ===
President Mohammad Najibullah, leader of the Democratic Republic of Afghanistan, was forced to resign on 15 April 1992. The Peshawar Accord of 25 April 1992, which established a power-sharing interim government to take control of Kabul, was signed by six of the seven major Afghan anti-Soviet resistance parties (notably excluding the Hezb-e Islami ["Islamic Party"] faction of Gulbuddin Hekmatyar, a Pashtun, who refused to sign the Accord), and supported by some remnants of the Najibullah administration. An Islamic state was proclaimed, Islamic law introduced, bars were closed, and women were ordered to wear the hijab. In June, Burhanuddin Rabbani, leader of the Tajik-dominated Jamiat-e Islami ("Islamic Association") faction, was made interim-president of the new Islamic State of Afghanistan, and on 30 December 1992 he was elected head of the 7-member Government Council for a two-year term. However, Hekmatyar's Hezb-e Islami rebel faction (which had split from Jamiat-e Islami in 1976) demanded a share in power as well, and started clashing with Rabbani's troops. After months of fighting, they signed an agreement in March 1993 making Hekmatyar the Prime Minister of Afghanistan in June, and shortening Rabbani's presidency from 2 years to 1.5 year. Fighting between different rebel factions continued, however, and Kabul was largely destroyed.

=== Rise of the Taliban ===
In late 1994, a new Pashtun-dominated Islamic fundamentalist militia called the Taliban (lit. '"Religious students"') managed to conquer large parts of southern Afghanistan with the support of Pakistan. Making steady gains throughout 1995 and 1996, the Taliban were able to seize control of the capital city of Kabul in September 1996, driving the Rabbani government and other factions northward, and by the end of the year occupying two-thirds of Afghanistan. Former president Najibullah was arrested and executed in public by hanging on 27 September 1996.

The Taliban renamed the country the Islamic Emirate of Afghanistan, and imposed an even more strict version of Sharia and purdah on the population they controlled. This especially negatively impacted women, who were forced to wear a burqa, stay indoors and banned from working outside the house with rare exceptions. Almost all girls lost access to education, increasing illiteracy rates. Movie theaters, soccer stadiums, and television stations were now closed as well.

=== Northern Alliance ===
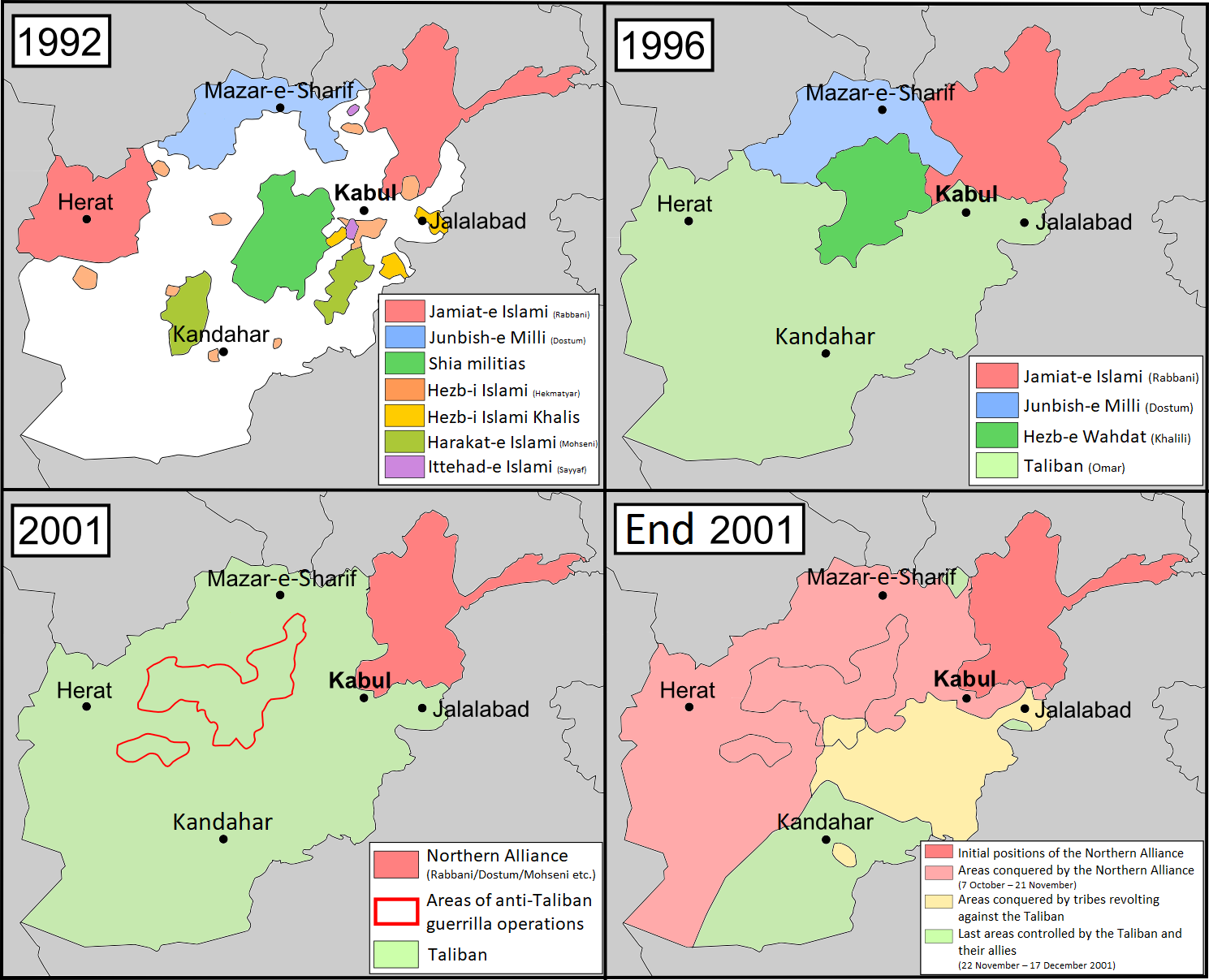
Progress of the war (1992–2001)

The ousted Rabbani government formed a political coalition with Tajik leader Ahmed Shah Massoud, Uzbek warlord Abdul Rashid Dostum, and the Shia Hizb-i-Wahdat faction (dominated by Hazaras) of Karim Khalili. Its formal name was United Islamic Front for the Salvation of Afghanistan, known in the Western world as the Northern Alliance, and its goal was to take back the country from the Taliban.

By the end of May 1997, the Taliban offensive came to a halt due to a number of strategic victories by the Northern Alliance. International pressure forced both sides to negotiate, but the demands posed by either party were so high that the differences were irreconcilable, and a political impasse ensued. The country was in a dire state according to a 1997 United Nations report, which found that the infant mortality rate was 25%, numerous civil casualties due to landmines, economic blockades imposed by the militias causing hunger, and international humanitarian organisations being unable to carry out their work. A February 1998 earthquake in northeastern Afghanistan killed 4,500 people.

In the first half of 1998, the negotiations appeared to reach a peace settlement, but then the Northern Alliance fell apart. Taking advantage of the resistance factions' disunity the Taliban launched a campaign, rapidly conquering the provincial capital cities of Maimana, Sheberghan, and finally Mazar-i-Sharif (8 August 1998). Taliban fighters committed a massacre amongst the Shia population of the last city, also killing eight Iranian diplomats and journalists. This aroused international outrage, and brought the Taliban regime on the brink of war with Iran.

The Northern Alliance drove the Taliban away in December 2001, following the United States invasion of Afghanistan. The Islamic State of Afghanistan was succeeded by the interim Transitional Islamic State of Afghanistan in 2002.

== Gallery ==
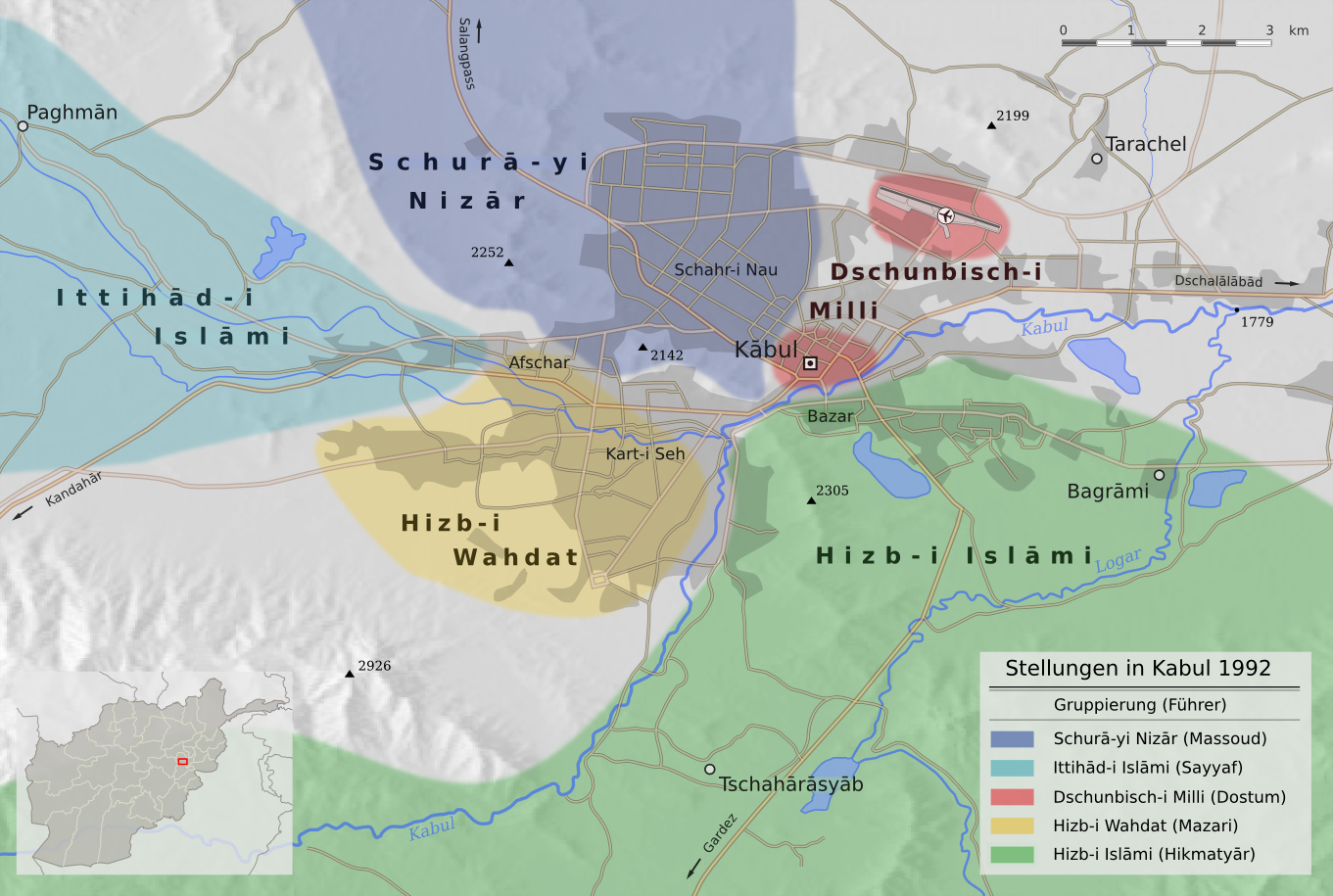
Faction control in Kabul (1992)

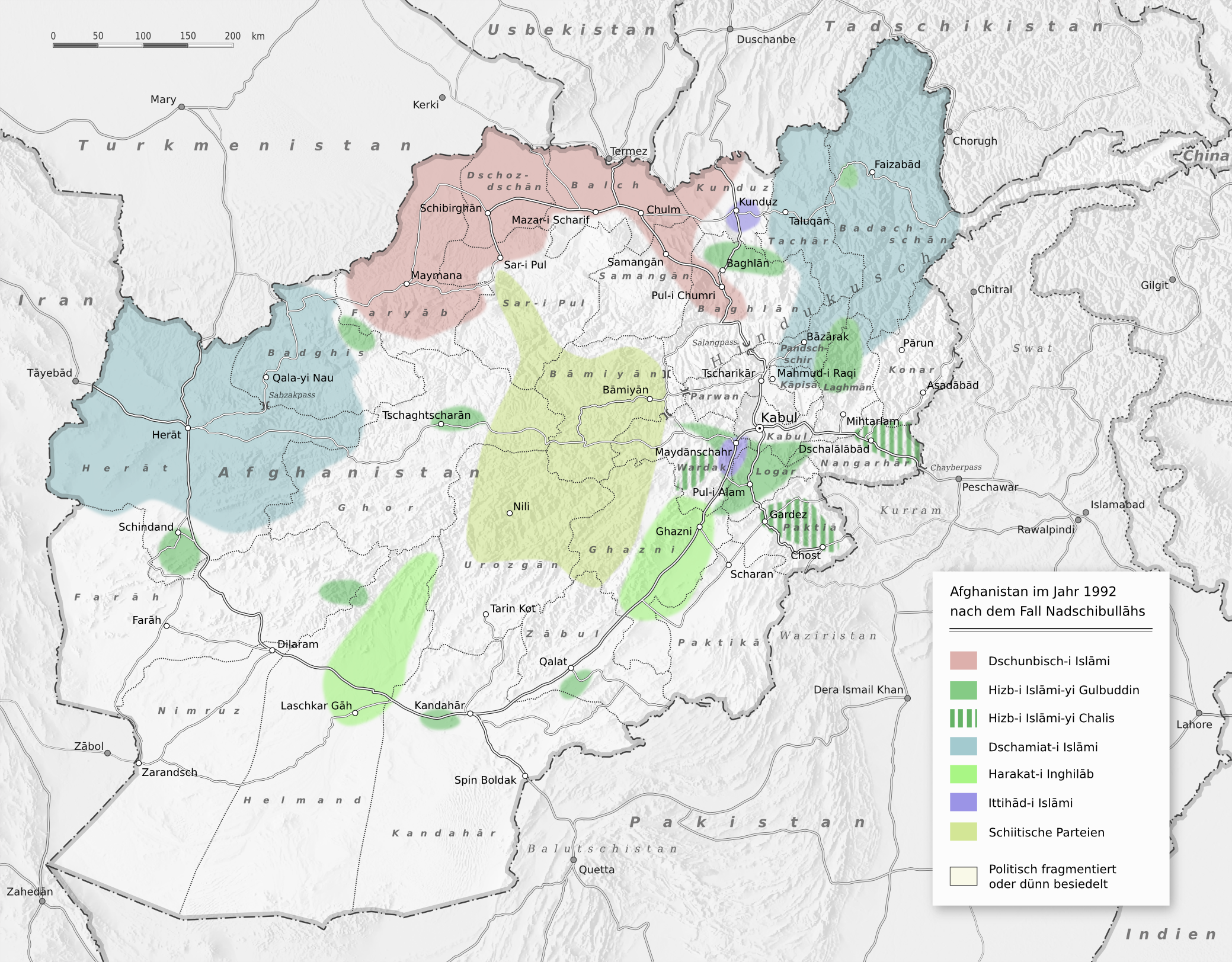
Factions after the fall of Najibullah (1992)

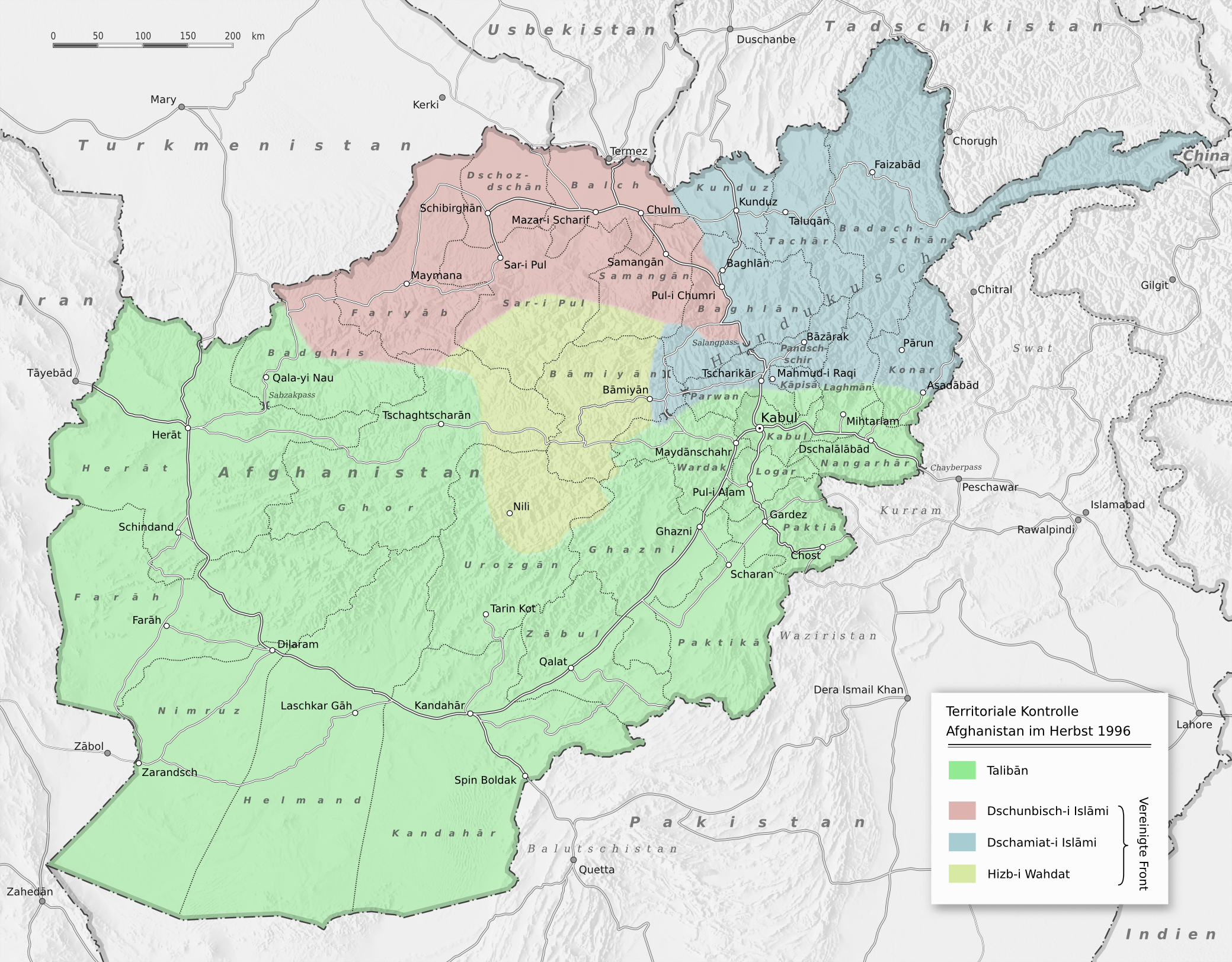
Factions after Taliban conquered Kabul (1996)

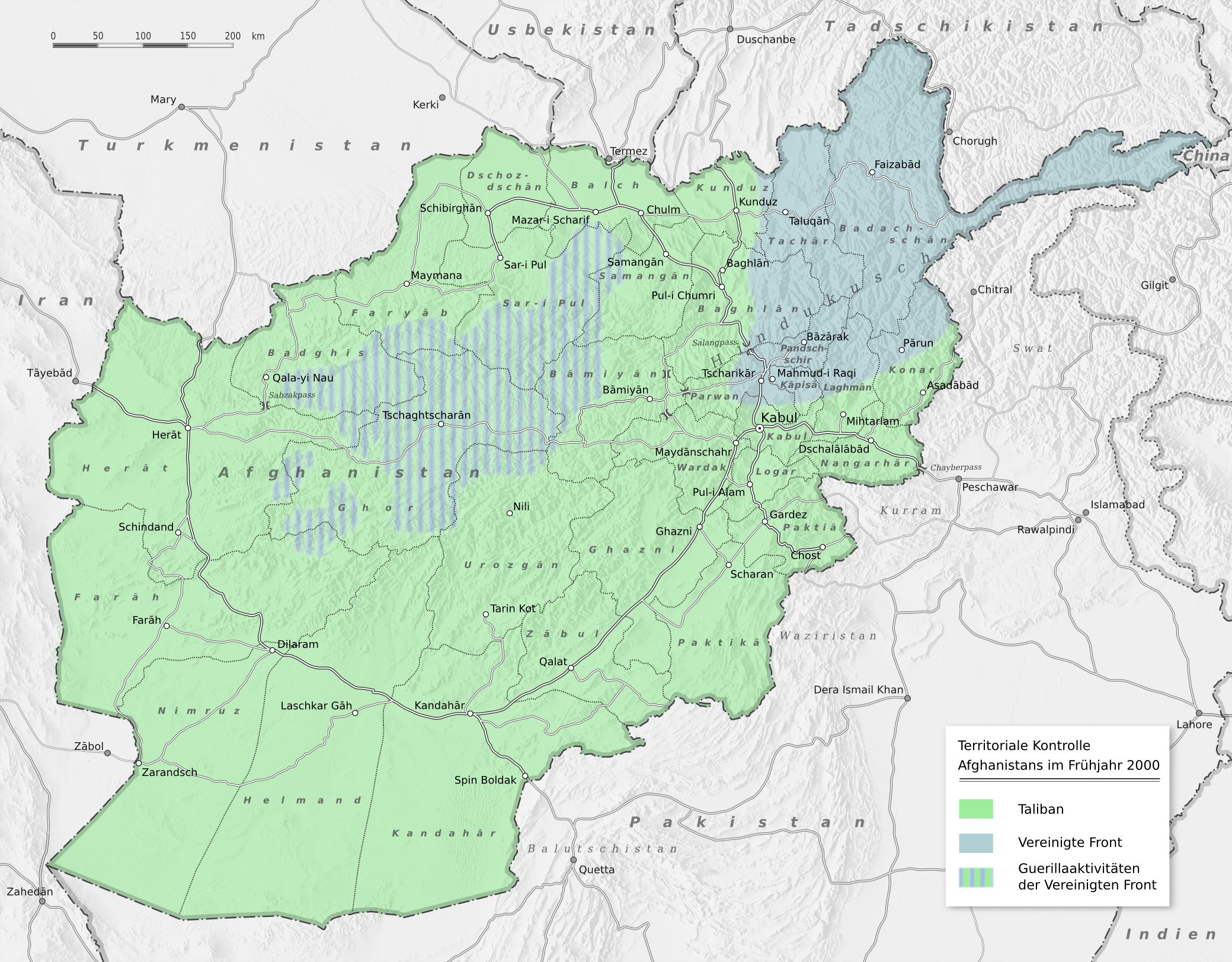
Taliban–Northern Alliance war (2000)

== Bibliography ==
- Saikal, Amin (2004). Modern Afghanistan: A History of Struggle and Survival. I.B.Tauris. ISBN 978-0-85771-478-7.

Preceded by Republic of Afghanistan	Islamic State of Afghanistan; 1992–1996	Succeeded by Islamic Emirate of Afghanistan
Preceded by Islamic Emirate of Afghanistan	Islamic State of Afghanistan; 2001–2002	Succeeded by Transitional Islamic State of Afghanistan
