= Burhanuddin Rabbani =

President of Afghanistan from 1992 to 2001

- برهان‌الدین ربانی
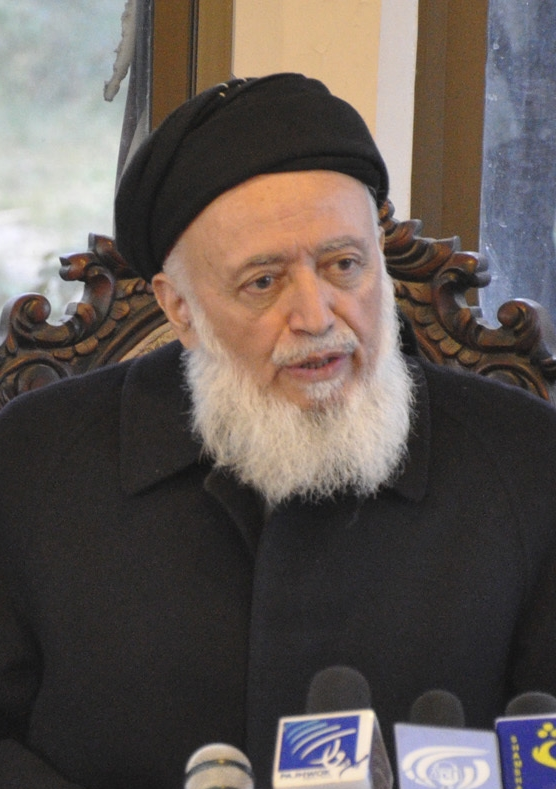
- Rabbani in 2010

6th President of Afghanistan
- In office 28 June 1992 – 22 December 2001; Disputed by Mullah Omar (as Supreme Leader) from 27 September 1996 – 13 November 2001
- Prime Minister: Abdul Sabur Farid Kohistani; Gulbuddin Hekmatyar; Arsala Rahmani (acting); Ahmad Shah Ahmadzai (acting); Abdul Rahim Ghafoorzai
- Vice President: Abdul Rasul Sayyaf; Mawlawi Mir Hamza; Mohammad Shah Fazli; Mohammad Nabi Mohammadi
- Preceded by: Mohammad Najibullah
- Succeeded by: Hamid Karzai

Personal details
- Born: 20 September 1940 Yaftal, Fayzabad District, Badakhshan, Kingdom of Afghanistan
- Died: 20 September 2011 (aged 71) Kabul, Islamic Republic of Afghanistan
- Party: Jamiat-e Islami
- Children: 4, including Salahuddin
- Education: Kabul University (BA); Al-Azhar University (MA, PhD)
- Occupation: Politician, teacher, Mujahideen leader
- Awards: Order of Ismoili Somoni – posthumously awarded on 2 September 2014

Military service
- Allegiance: Afghanistan

Burhanuddin Rabbani (Note: Dari: برهان‌الدین ربانی, romanized: Burhānuddīn Rabbānī, Dari pronunciation: [bʊ'rɑː.nʊ'd̪íːn räb.bɑː'ni], Pashto: برهان الدين رباني, Pashto pronunciation: [bu.rɑ.'nu.din ra.bɑ.ni]) (20 September 1940 – 20 September 2011) was an Afghan politician and teacher who served as the sixth president of Afghanistan from 1992 to 1996, and again from November to December 2001 (in exile from 1996 to 2001).

Born in the Badakhshan Province, Rabbani studied at Kabul University and worked there as a professor of Islamic theology. He formed the Jamiat-e Islami at the university which attracted then-students Gulbuddin Hekmatyar and Ahmad Shah Massoud, both would eventually become the two leading commanders of the Afghan mujahideen in the Soviet–Afghan War from 1979. Rabbani was chosen to be the President of Afghanistan after the end of the former communist regime in 1992. Rabbani and his Islamic State of Afghanistan government was later forced into exile by the Taliban, and he then served as the political head of the Northern Alliance, an alliance of various political groups who fought against the Taliban regime in Afghanistan. During his time in the office, there were a lot of internal clashes between different fighting groups.

After the Taliban government was toppled during Operation Enduring Freedom, Rabbani returned to Kabul and served briefly as president from 13 November to 22 December 2001, when Hamid Karzai was chosen as his succeeding interim leader at the Bonn International Conference. In later years he became head of Afghanistan National Front (known in the media as United National Front), the largest political opposition to Karzai's government.

On 20 September 2011, Rabbani was assassinated by a suicide bomber entering his home in Kabul. As suggested by the Afghan parliament, Afghanistan's President Hamid Karzai gave him the title of "Martyr of Peace". His son Salahuddin Rabbani was chosen in April 2012 to lead efforts to forge peace in Afghanistan with the Taliban.

== Early life and education ==
Rabbani, son of Muhammed Yousuf, was born on 20 September 1940 in the village of Yaftal, Fayzabad District, Badakhshan. His ethnicity was Tajik. After finishing school in his native province, he went to Darul-uloom-e-Sharia (Abu-Hanifa), a religious school in Kabul. When he graduated from Abu-Hanifa, he attended Kabul University to study Islamic Law and Theology, graduating in 1963.

Soon after his graduation in 1963, he was hired as a professor at Kabul University. In order to enhance himself, Rabbani went to Egypt in 1966, and he entered the Al-Azhar University in Cairo where he developed close ties to the Muslim Brotherhood leadership. In two years, he received his master's degree in Islamic Philosophy. He resumed his position at the university and became closely associated with his fellow professor, Gholam Mohammad Niazi, whom he served as secretary in 1969 and 1970. Rabbani was one of the first Afghans to translate the works of Sayyid Qutb into Persian. Later he returned to Egypt to complete his PhD in Islamic philosophy and his thesis was titled "The Philosophy and Teachings of Abd al-Rahman Muhammad Jami." In 2004 he received Afghanistan's highest academic and scientific title "Academician" from the Academy of Sciences of Afghanistan. He could speak six languages.

== Political career ==
Rabbani returned to Afghanistan in 1968, where the High Council of Jamiat-e Islami gave him the duty of organizing the university students. Due to his knowledge, reputation, and active support for the cause of Islam, in 1972, a 15-member council selected him as head of Jamiat-e Islami of Afghanistan; the founder of Jamiat-e Islami of Afghanistan, Gholam Mohammad Niazi was also present. Jamiat-e Islami was primarily composed of Tajiks.

In the spring of 1974, the police came to Kabul University to arrest Rabbani for his pro-Islamic stance, but with the help of his students the police were unable to capture him, and he managed to escape to neighboring Pakistan. There, Rabbani gathered important people and established the party. Sayed Noorullah Emad, who was then a young Muslim in the University of Kabul, became the General Secretary of the party and, later, its deputy chief. Rabbani alongside Ahmad Shah Massoud and others planned to take action either against the Daoud government or people who they deemed communist in 1975, but failed.

Among ourselves we decided that Daoud personally was not a communist, but a Muslim, surrounded by communists, who should be eliminated. For that purpose we prepared a list of eighty military and civilian communists and instructed our companions to carry it out.…Surprisingly news of the failure of the uprising in Laghman and other regions reached us in Peshawar.

When the Soviets intervened in 1979, Rabbani helped lead Jamiat-e Islami in resistance to the People's Democratic Party of Afghanistan regime. Rabbani's forces were the first Mujahideen elements to enter Kabul in 1992 when the PDPA government fell from power. He took over as president from 1992 in accordance to the Peshawar Accords. Rabbani was the third ethnic Tajik leader of modern Afghanistan after Habibullah Kalakani in 1929 and Abdul Qadir in 1978 (and possibly including Babrak Karmal, whose ethnicity was disputed). His rule was limited since the country was fractured by civil war between different sides. Rabbani was forced to flee following the Taliban's conquest of Kabul in 1996. Rabbani operated his government in exile, following the establishment of the Taliban rule of the Islamic Emirate of Afghanistan. In this period between 1996 and 2001, the Rabbani government of the Islamic State of Afghanistan remained the internationally recognized government, despite only controlling about 10% of Afghan territory. For the next five years, he and the Northern Alliance, commanded by Ahmad Shah Massoud and others, were fighting the Taliban until the 2001 US-led Operation Enduring Freedom toppled the Taliban government. Rabbani was head of Afghanistan's High Peace Council, which had been formed in 2010 to initiate peace talks with the Taliban and other groups in the insurgency, until his death.

== Assassination ==
Rabbani was killed in a suicide bombing at his home in Kabul on 20 September 2011, his 71st birthday. Two men posing as Taliban representatives approached him to offer a hug and detonated their explosives. At least one of them had hidden the explosives in his turban. The suicide bomber claimed to be a Taliban commander, said he bore a "very important and positive message" from Taliban leaders in Pakistan, and said he wanted to "discuss peace" with Rabbani. Four other members of Afghanistan's High Peace Council were also killed in the blast. Rabbani was buried in the Wazir Akbar Khan cemetery.

Afghan officials blamed the Quetta Shura, which was the leadership of the Afghan Taliban allegedly hiding in the affluent Satellite Town of Quetta in Pakistan. The Pakistani government confirmed that Rabbani's assassination was linked to Afghan refugees in Pakistan. A senior Pakistani official stated that over 90% of terrorist attacks in Pakistan were traced back to Afghan elements and that their presence in the country was "an important issue for [peace in] Pakistan" and "a problem for Afghanistan". Pakistani foreign minister Hina Rabbani Khar stated that Pakistan was "not responsible if Afghan refugees crossed the border and entered Kabul, stayed in a guest house and attacked Professor Rabbani".

In 2011, just days before he died, Rabbani was trying to persuade Islamic scholars to issue a religious edict denouncing suicide bombings. The former president's 28-year-old daughter said in an interview that her father died shortly after he spoke at a conference on "Islamic Awakening" in Tehran. "Right before he was assassinated, he talked about the suicide bombing issue," Fatima Rabbani told Reuters. "He called on all Islamic scholars in the conference to release a fatwa" against the tactic.

Government minister Nematullah Shahrani said Rabbani is irreplaceable because "he had relations with all these tribes."

United States President Barack Obama and several NATO military leaders condemned the assassination. Japan also offered its condolences at the Sixty-sixth session of the United Nations General Assembly. Afghan President Hamid Karzai cut short his trip for the General debate of the sixty-sixth session of the United Nations General Assembly following Rabbani's assassination. Rabbani's son Salahuddin then took over chairmanship of the High Peace Council from his father.

== Books and booklets ==
Rabbi had written books and booklets in both Dari and Pashto, including:

- The Birth of Light [Dari], Jamiat-i-Islami Afghanistan, Peshawar, 1988 (1367), 78 p.
- Destiny of Revolution behind the Conflicts [Dari], Jamiat-i-Islami Afghanistan, [Peshawar], 1988 (1367), 44 p.
- Message to Commanders and Countrymen [Dari], Jamiat-i-Islami Afghanistan, [Peshawar], 1988 (1367), 23 p.
- Mujahed Guide: address of Burhanuddin Rabbani on the occasion of Eid-e-Sayed Fiter [Pashtu], Jamiat-i-Islami Afghanistan, Peshawar, 1989 (1409), 38 p.
- Reconstruction of Afghanistan [Dari], Ministry of Reconstruction, [Peshawar], 1990 (1369), 47 p.
- Direction of the Jihad: collections of interviews of addresses by the leader of Jamait Islami Afghanistan [Dari], Jamiat-i-Islami Afghanistan, Tehran, 1990 (1369), 364 p.
- The First four Caliphs [Pashtu], Jamiat-i-Islami Afghanistan, [Peshawar], 1991 (1370), 61 p.
- Islamic Revolution, the outcome of the 14-year struggle of our people [Dari], Kabul, Government Printing Press, 1993 (1372), 31 p.
- Learning according to the direction of the Islamic revolution [Dari], Jamiat-i-Islami Afghanistan, [Kabul], 1993 (1372), 44 p.
- Drugs are the enemy of human health [Dari], Jamiat-i-Islami Afghanistan, Kabul, Government Printing Press, 1996 (1375), 16 p.

== Honors and awards ==
- Tajikistan :
  - Order of Ismoili Somoni – posthumously awarded on 2 September 2014

== See also ==
- Ahmad Shah Massoud
- Mohammad Panah
- Salahuddin Rabbani
- Gholam Mohammad Niazi
- Badaber Uprising
- Jamiat-e-Islami (Afghanistan)

== Notes ==
Political offices
Preceded by Mohammad Najibullah	3rd President of Afghanistan; 1992 – December 2001; Disputed by Mullah Omar (as Supreme Leader) from 1996 – November 2001; Reason for dispute: Afghan Civil War (1996–2001)	Succeeded by Hamid Karzai
