= The Last Ambassador =

2025 Austrian documentary film

- Official Poster
- German: Die letzte Botschafterin
- Directed by: Natalie Halla
- Screenplay by: Natalie Halla
- Produced by: Peter Drössler; Arash T. Riahi; Sabine Grubler; Natalie Halla
- Cinematography: Natalie Halla; Jordan Bryon; Judith Benedikt
- Edited by: Birgit Foerster
- Music by: Karwan Marouf
- Release date: 22 March 2025 (CPH:DOX)
- Running time: 1hr 17 mins
- Country: Austria
- Languages: Dari, English

The Last Ambassador (German: Die letzte Botschafterin) a 2025 Austrian documentary film directed by Natalie Halla. It profiles Manizha Bakhtari, Afghanistan’s ambassador to the Vienna based organizations of UN and OSCE and the Republic of Austria, who became the country’s only female ambassador following the Taliban’s return to power in 2021.

The film examines Bakhtari's diplomatic role and advocacy for women’s rights while in exile, including her refusal to represent the Taliban-led government, which is not internationally recognized. It also documents her initiatives such as the "Daughters" program, aimed at providing education to Afghan schoolgirls in secret, alongside her participation in international forums addressing the situation in Afghanistan.

== Summary ==
Afghanistan's last female ambassador, Manizha Bakhtari, is risking everything in her fight for the rights of girls and women in Afghanistan.

== Production ==
The Last Ambassador was filmed in Dari and English, and shot between 2021 and 2024 in Austria, Afghanistan, Canada, Tajikistan, and the United States. Director Halla stated that the project originated after she saw Bakhtari in a television interview following the Taliban's return to power in Afghanistan, and sought to document her experiences.

Filming began with the intention of covering the early transitional weeks after the Taliban takeover, but continued for several years as Bakhtari remained in her post despite a formal recall by the Taliban government. Halla described the challenge of creating a visually compelling narrative around the work of a diplomat, which she considered a profession with limited visual drama. Working with editor Birgit Foerster and Jordan Bryon as consultant, the production emphasized personal and human moments to maintain audience engagement.

== Release ==
It had its world premiered on March 22, 2025, at the Copenhagen International Documentary Film Festival (CPH:DOX), within the F:ACT Competition section. It was subsequently screened at Hot Docs 2025 on April, 2025 and later at Biografilm Festival, where it was nominated for International Competition and received a Special Mention.

On July 1, 2025, The Last Ambassador was screened at the Filmcasino in Vienna, as part of an event organized by the Maltese delegation to the Organization for Security and Co-operation in Europe to mark the International Day of Women in Diplomacy.

The theatrical release of the film is scheduled for August 15, 2025. International distribution is handled by The Party Filmsales.

== Reception ==
=== Critical review ===
Amber Wilkinson of Eye for Film noted that while Bakhtari may not be widely known, The Last Ambassador makes a compelling case for why she should be. Wilkinson highlighted director Halla's use of a day-count motif — tracking the days since the Taliban's takeover — as a device that gives the documentary a strong sense of momentum.

Andrew Parker of TheGATE.ca described The Last Ambassador as a documentary that “dutifully documents one woman’s fight to stand up against a totalitarian regime in a country she loves deeply, but is unable to return to.” He observed that while the documentary outlines the dangers faced by women in Afghanistan and portrays Bakhtari's resilience, it offers limited detail on her specific programs. Parker commended the film for its examination of the political situation in Afghanistan, including the impact of the 2020 Doha Agreement, and for providing a broad view of why Bakhtari's advocacy remains significant.

Rachel Ho of POV Magazine described The Last Ambassador as a powerful documentary that follows Bakhtari in her fight to amplify women's voices in her home country. Ho praised director Halla for making a strong case for renewed global attention on Afghanistan, adding that films like The Last Ambassador make it clear that “everything is not fine” and call on audiences to take action, whether through raising awareness, protesting, or engaging with political representatives.
