= Muslim Youth =

Muslim Youth سازمان جوانان مسلمان
- Leader: Habibur Rahman; Saifuddin Nasratyar; Gulbuddin Hekmatyar.
- Founded: 1969
- Dissolved: 1975
- Succeeded by: Hezb-e Islami
- Headquarters: Kabul
- Ideology: Islamism; Qutbism; Pashtun Interests; Tribalism; Republicanism; Anti-communism
- Political position: Right-wing
- Religion: Sunni Islam

Muslim Youth (Dari: سازمان جوانان مسلمان Sāzmān-e Jawānān-e Musulmān) was an Islamist group founded in 1969 in Kabul by several Afghan junior professors and a handful of students at Kabul University. Many of the leading figures of the Soviet–Afghan War were members of this group, including Professor Mawlavi Habibur Rahman, Engineer Habibur Rahman, Saifuddin Nasratyar, and Engineer Gulbuddin Hekmatyar.

== History ==
The Muslim Youth Organization was founded in 1969 in Kabul, at a critical point in Afghanistan's history, with proponents of communism and Qutb-inspired Islamism vying fiercely to gain supremacy in determining the direction of the state and society. Kabul University was a center of this conflict, with both Marxists and Islamists on the faculty and corresponding student organizations dedicated to the respective ideologies. One professor of the Shar`ia faculty (the department for the study of Islamic law), the future mujahidin leader Burhanuddin Rabbani, had recently translated Sayyid Qutb's Milestones (Ma`alim fi'l-tariq) into Dari and was teaching this text at the university.

It was in this context that the Muslim Youth Organization was formed, and at its founding Rabbani was named its chairman, Sayyaf its vice-chairman, and Hekmatyar—though still in prison for the murder of a Maoist student—its political director. The group, in this form anyway, was short-lived; after a failed uprising attempt in Panjshir Valley in 1975 where it failed to gain local support, the Republic's government of Sardar Mohammed Daoud Khan cracked down on Islamists, leading to all of the Muslim Youth leaders fleeing to Pakistan and the Organization itself ceased to exist. Its leaders continued to pursue its mission, however, and eventually went on to lead a successful insurgency war against the Marxist Democratic Republic of Afghanistan, backed by the Soviet Union, between 1979 and 1989.
