= Saydal Sokhandan =

Afghan Maoist activist

Saydal Sokhandan was an Afghan poet, a Maoist activist, and a student leader. He was studying at the Kabul University in the early-1970s. He organized students from Progressive Youth Organization in the university. PYO is considered the first revolutionary communist formation in Afghanistan with Maoist ideology.

Sokhandan was assassinated by Gulbuddin Hekmatyar in the early 1970s.

== Poetry ==
Saydal Sokhandan has many poems in the Pashto language. One of his poems is:

په ټوپک او په برچه دی استعمار پاره پاره کړه
شابه شابه ای کارګره خپل ایمان غیرت ښکاره کړه

Translation:

Tear apart colonialism with your gun and knife
Bravo Bravo Workers show your faith and determination
