= Panah Khan Panjshiri =

Afghan military commander

- Born: Afghanistan
- Military career
- Allegiance: Jamiat-e Islami.
- Rank: General

Commander Panah Khan was one of the top commanders of Ahmed Shah Massoud's Jamiat-e Islami during the civil war in Afghanistan. He is reportedly deceased.

== Soviet resistance ==
On 18 July 1986, a regime-staged court proceeding in Kabul sentenced Panah Khan to death in absentia, along with other resistance commanders Ahmad Shah Massoud, Ismail Khan, Alaudin Khan, Haqqani and Sayed Mansour Hussainyar.
