= Manizha Bakhtari =

Afghan ambassador

Manizha Bakhtari منیژه باختری
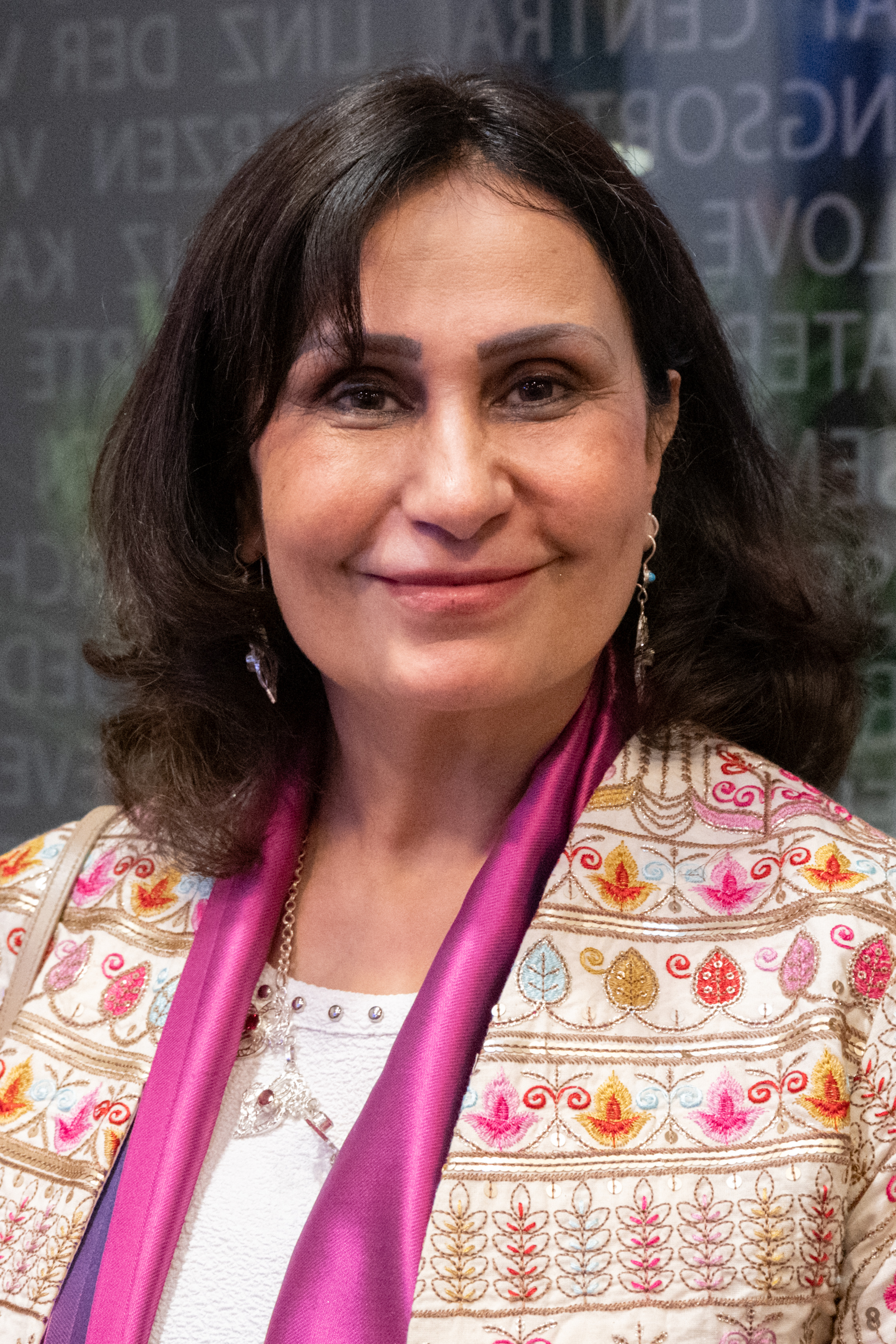

Afghanistan Ambassador to Austria
- Incumbent
- Assumed office September 2020
- President: Ashraf Ghani

Afghanistan Ambassador to the Nordic Countries
- In office September 2009 – August 2015
- President: Hamid Karzai
- Preceded by: Jawed Ludin
- Succeeded by: Shukria Barakzai

Afghan Ministry of Foreign Affairs Chief of Staff
- In office 2007–2009

Personal details
- Born: Kabul, Afghanistan
- Spouse: Naser Hotaki
- Children: Mustafa Hotaki, Nosheen Hotaki, Parnian Hotaki
- Education: Kabul University

Manizha Bakhtari (Pashto : منیژه باختری) is an Afghan diplomat, author and journalist renowned for her contributions to the country's literary and political landscape. She is currently the Afghan ambassador to Austria, leading one of Afghanistan's most significant diplomatic representations. Bakhtari previously served as the country's ambassador to the Nordic countries (Norway, Sweden, Denmark, Iceland and Finland), as well as the chief of staff for Afghanistan's Ministry of Foreign Affairs.

Prior to her diplomatic career, Bakhtari served as a lecturer at Kabul University's Journalism Faculty, which is her alma mater. She is particularly recognized for her fight against gender discrimination and apartheid in Afghanistan, a cause to which she has dedicated her literary and professional careers. Her activism intensified in response to the Taliban's resurgence in 2021, during which she was outspoken about the rights of women and girls in Afghanistan. She is one of the few women in the country to have been ranked ambassador, and has used her platform to advocate for international support and attention to the plight of Afghan women.

== Diplomatic career ==
Between 2007 and 2009, Bakhtari was the chief of staff at the Ministry of Foreign Affairs.

Bakhtari was Ambassador to the Nordic countries from September 2009.

After the Taliban took Afghanistan over again in 2021, they sent Bakhtari a letter of dismissal, which she ignored, and cut off funding. However, she remains the accredited ambassador of Afghanistan to Austria as of 2025, making her the only woman still serving as an Afghan ambassador.

Bakhtari was the subject of the 2025 documentary The Last Ambassador, directed by Austrian filmmaker Natalie Halla, which chronicled her continued diplomatic work in exile and her advocacy for the rights of Afghan women under Taliban rule.

== Bibliography ==
Bakhtari’s contributions as an author span both academic and literary fields.

Academic Work:

- Jahan-e Del Angize Khabar (Persian: جهان دل‌ انگیز خبر)
- Angabin Neshkhand wa Sharang Noshkhand (Persian: انگبین نیشخند و شرنگ نوشخند)
- Akhlaq wa Huquq dar Journalism (Persian: اخلاق و حقوق در ژورنالیزم)
- Rozname Negari Adabi (Persian: روزنامه نگاری ادبی)
- 93 Sal Rasana wa Qanun (Persian: (Persian: سال رسانه و قانون ۹۳)

Literary Work:

- Se Pari (Persian: سه پری)
- Char Dukhtare Zardusht (Persian: چار دختر زردشت)
- Khakestar-e Shirin (Persian: خاکستر شیرین)
- Dastina Ha (Persian: دستینه ها)

In addition, Bakhtari served as the editor-in-chief of Parnian, a cultural and literature quarterly publication she started.

== Personal life ==
Bakhtari is married to Naser Hotaki, an Afghan businessman and sports executive. They have four children together: Mariam, Mustafa, Nosheen, and Parnian Hotaki. Bakhtari's mother-in-law, Benazir Hotaki.
