= Khalida Furugh =

Afghan poet and academic

Khalida Furugh (born 1972; Dari: خالده فروغ) is an Afghan poet and academic. She is considered one of the country's leading female poets.

== Biography ==
Khalida Furugh was born in Kabul in 1972. After graduating high school, she studied literature at Kabul University.

Early in her career, she joined Radio Afghanistan's arts and literature department, eventually becoming head of the literature section in 1994. She left Afghanistan during the Taliban's rule in the 1990s and early 2000s, living in Pakistan, and then returning after their fall.

Furugh is best known for her work as a poet. Her writing is popular in Afghanistan. She has been described as one of the "most promising poets of her generation," and she is considered one of her country's leading female poets.

Her writing is tied to her Persian background and identity, incorporating elements of Persian mythology. She seeks to reconcile Afghanistan's past and present. Her work also deals with women's roles in society, although she rejects the idea that there is a distinct "feminine" or "masculine" form of poetry, arguing poetic writing is not inextricably linked to a gender binary. She has published at least six books of poetry, including "Resurrection of Mithra" (1994), "Always Five in the Afternoon" (2007), "In Streets of Sleep and Memories" (2001), "Cemetery Is Endless Novel" (2009), "In World's Empty Alley" (2009), and "My Tomorrow Happened Yesterday" (2012).

Furugh is a faculty member at Kabul University, where she teaches Persian language and literature. She has also written works of literary criticism and produced a literary program for the TOLO TV channel. During her time in Pakistan, she ran the magazine Sadaf. She is also a notable member of the PEN Afghanistan Center.
