= United National Front (Afghanistan) =

2006–2011 political party in Afghanistan

- Leader: Burhanuddin Rabbani
- Founded: 2006 (no longer active)
- Ideology: National Unity; Electoral reform

The United National Front was a coalition of various political parties in Afghanistan. The group was a broad coalition of former and current strongmen, commanders from the anti-Soviet resistance, ex-Communist leaders, and various social and ethnic groups. Its leader was former President of Afghanistan Burhanuddin Rabbani. Many of its members were formerly part of the similarly named United Islamic Front (Northern Alliance).

Reports of when the group was founded vary. Stratfor reported the group was founded on April 3, 2006. Ron Synovitz reported on February 6, 2008 that the group was founded in 2007.

The UNF wanted to secure unity in the divided country. It wanted to amend the 2003 constitution to allow political parties to stand in elections, to change the electoral system from a single non-transferable vote system to a party-list electoral system, and to hold direct elections for provincial governors.

Members included Mustafa Zahir (grandson of former king Mohammad Zahir Shah), ex-defense minister Mohammad Qasim Fahim, parliamentary speaker Yunus Qanuni, Vice President Ahmad Zia Massoud, former general Abdul Rashid Dostum, former Communist-era generals, Sayed Mohammad Gulabzoy and Nur ul-Haq Olumi, and Hezb-Islami commanders, like Qazi Amin Waqad. The Front's exact size was unknown, but it claimed to be backed by 40% of Afghanistan's parliament.

In February 2008, Synovitz reported that Uzbek members of the United National Front suggested that charges filed against their leader Abdul Rashid Dostum could lead to civil war.

Burhanuddin Rabbani was assassinated in late 2011 by a Taliban supposed "peace emissary" who detonated a bomb while embracing Rabbani.

The United National Front as such is no longer active. Vice President Mohammad Qasim Fahim remains in an alliance with President Hamid Karzai. Meanwhile, in late 2011, Ahmad Zia Massoud, Haji Mohammad Mohaqiq, and Abdul Rashid Dostum created the National Front of Afghanistan as a reformation of the United Front (Northern Alliance) to oppose a return of the Taliban to power and to demand reforms from the Karzai government.

== Electoral history ==
=== Presidential elections ===
Election	Party candidate	Votes	%	Result
2009	Abdullah Abdullah	1,406,242	30.59%	Lost ✗
