= Abdul Sabur Farid Kohistani =

Afghan politician (1952–2007)

Abdul Sabur Farid Kohistani عبدالصبور فريد کوهستاني

Prime Minister of Afghanistan
- In office 6 July 1992 – 15 August 1992
- President: Burhanuddin Rabbani
- Preceded by: Fazal Haq Khaliqyar as Chairman of the Council of Ministers
- Succeeded by: Gulbuddin Hekmatyar (1993)

Personal details
- Born: 1952 Kohistan, Kapisa, Kingdom of Afghanistan
- Died: 2 May 2007 (aged 54–55) Kabul, Islamic Republic of Afghanistan
- Party: Hezb-e-Islami Gulbuddin

Abdul Sabur Farid Kohistani (Dari/Pashto عبدل صبور فرید کوهستانی ) (1952 – May 2, 2007) briefly served as Prime Minister of Afghanistan from July 6, 1992, until August 15, 1992. He was a member of Gulbuddin Hekmatyar's Hezbi Islami.

He later served as a member of the upper house of the National Assembly of Afghanistan until he was assassinated in a shooting outside his home in Kabul on May 2, 2007. Police said his assassins had set up an ambush for him when he left his home to go to a mosque.
