= Satellite Town, Chiniot =

Pakistani town

Satellite Town
- Town
- Location within Pakistan
- Coordinates: 31°36′13″N 72°43′35″E
- Country: Pakistan
- Province: Punjab
- District: Chiniot

Satellite Town is a town and a union council of Chiniot district in Punjab, Pakistan. It is located in Chiniot city. According to the 2017 census, Chiniot city population, including Satellite Town, is 278,747.

Until 2009, Chiniot Tehsil was part of Jhang District, when Chiniot Tehsil was upgraded to a district by the government.

== Facilities ==
Election commission office, Sui Gas office, Post Office, Passport Office, Hockey Ground, Excise and Taxation office, Zakat distribution office, Deaf & Dumb School are located in Satellite Town.
