= Satellite Town, Jhang =

Satellite Town
- Town
- Location within Pakistan
- Coordinates: 31°15′36″N 72°21′02″E
- Country: Pakistan
- Province: Punjab
- District: Jhang
- Time zone: UTC+5 (PST)

Satellite Town is a town in Jhang city in Punjab, Pakistan. It is located at the coordinates 31°15'36"N and 72°21'2"E.
