= Mohammad Shah Fazli =

Mawlawi Mohammad Shah Fazli
- محمد شاه فضلی

Vice President of Afghanistan
- In office January 1993 – 1994
- President: Burhanuddin Rabbani
- Preceded by: Mawlawi Mir Hamza
- Succeeded by: Mohammad Nabi Mohammadi

Personal details
- Party: Harakat-i Inqilab-i Islami

Mohammad Shah Fazli is an Islamist politician from Afghanistan who served as Vice President of Afghanistan and chief justice of Supreme Court of Afghanistan.

He was also deputy leader of Harakat-i Inqilab-i Islami.
