= Gulbuddin Hekmatyar =

Afghan politician and drug trafficker (born 1949)

- ګلبدین حکمتیار
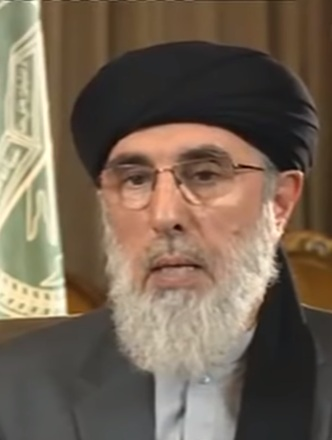
- Hekmatyar in 2019

Prime Minister of Afghanistan
- In office 26 June 1996 – 11 August 1997; Disputed by Mohammad Rabbani from 27 September 1996
- President: Burhanuddin Rabbani
- Preceded by: Ahmad Shah Ahmadzai (acting)
- Succeeded by: Abdul Rahim Ghafoorzai (Islamic State); Mohammad Rabbani (Islamic Emirate)
- In office 17 June 1993 – 28 June 1994
- President: Burhanuddin Rabbani
- Preceded by: Abdul Sabur Farid Kohistani (1992)
- Succeeded by: Arsala Rahmani Daulat (acting)

Personal details
- Born: 1 August 1949 (age 77) Imam Sahib District, Kingdom of Afghanistan
- Party: Hezb-e Islami Gulbuddin
- Education: Kabul University
- Military career
- Allegiance: Hezbi Islami (1975–1977); Hezb-e Islami Gulbuddin (1977–2016)
- Service years: 1975–2016
- Conflicts: Soviet–Afghan War; Afghan Civil War; First Nagorno-Karabakh War; War in Afghanistan (2001–2021)

Gulbuddin Hekmatyar (Note: Pashto: حکمتیار; Dari: گلبدین حکمتیار) (born 1 August 1949) is an Afghan politician, and former mujahideen commander and drug trafficker. He is the founder and current leader of the Hizb-i-Islami Afghanistan political party. He twice served as prime minister during the 1990s.

Born to a Ghilzai Pashtun family, Hekmatyar joined the Muslim Youth organization as a student in the early 1970s, where he was known for his Islamic radicalism rejected by much of the organization. He spent time in Pakistan before returning to Afghanistan when the Soviet–Afghan War began in 1979, at which time the CIA began funding his rapidly growing Hezb-e Islami organization through the Pakistani intelligence service, Inter-Services Intelligence. It was the largest of the Afghan mujahideen and Hekmatyar received more CIA funding than any other mujahideen leader during the Soviet-Afghan War.

In the late 1980s, Hekmatyar and his organization used the funds and weapons provided to them by the CIA to start trafficking opium, and later moved into manufacturing heroin. He established himself and his group amongst the leading heroin suppliers in the Middle East. Given the CIA's connection, this became a subject of diplomatic embarrassment for the US foreign service. Following the ouster of Soviet-backed Afghan President Mohammad Najibullah in 1992, Hekmatyar declined to form part of the Islamic State of Afghanistan and, with other warlords, engaged in the Afghan Civil War, leading to the death of around 50,000 civilians in Kabul alone. Hekmatyar was accused of bearing the most responsibility for the rocket attacks on the city. In the meantime, as part of the peace and power-sharing efforts led by Ahmad Shah Massoud, Hekmatyar became Prime Minister of Afghanistan from 1993 to 1994 and again briefly in 1996, before the Taliban takeover of Kabul forced him to flee to Iran's capital Tehran.

Sometime after the Taliban's fall in 2001 he went to Pakistan, leading his paramilitary forces into an unsuccessful armed campaign against Hamid Karzai's government and the international coalition in Afghanistan. In 2016, he signed a peace deal with the Afghan government and was allowed to return to Afghanistan after almost 20 years in exile.

Following the collapse of the Islamic Republic of Afghanistan, on 17 August 2021, Hekmatyar met with both Karzai and Abdullah Abdullah, former chairman of the High Council for National Reconciliation and former chief executive, in Doha, seeking to form a government. However, they were subdued as the Taliban formed a non-inclusive government in September 2021. Hekmatyar remained in Afghanistan under Taliban restrictions until going to Malaysia for medical treatment in December 2025.

== Early life ==
Gulbuddin Hekmatyar was born in 1949 in Imam Saheb, Kunduz province, in the north of what was then the Kingdom of Afghanistan, a member of the Kharoti tribe of Ghilji Pashtuns. His father, Ghulam Qader, who migrated to Kunduz, is originally from the Ghazni province. Afghan businessman and Kharoti tribal leader Gholam Serwar Nasher deemed Hekmatyar to be a bright young man and sent him to the Mahtab Qala military academy in 1968, but he was expelled due to his political views two years later. From 1969 to 1972, Hekmatyar attended Kabul University's engineering department. During his first year at the university he wrote a 149-page book entitled The Priority of Sense Over Matter, where he refutes communists denying the existence of God by quoting European philosophers and scientists like Hegel or Francesco Redi. Though he did not complete his degree, his followers still address him as "Engineer Hekmatyar".

During his years in university, Hekmatyar joined the Sazman-i Jawanan-i Musulman ("Organization of Muslim Youth") which was gaining influence because of its opposition to the Soviet influence in Afghanistan increasing through the PDPA elements in Daoud's government. He was one of the foundational members of the organization. He may have also been influenced by the ideological teachings of Muslim Brotherhood member Sayyid Qutb. By his own account he became an Islamist when he heard of Qutb's death in 1966, on radio, and also contradicts that he was a communist during his youth. In 1972, Hekmatyar assassinated student leader Saydal Sokhandan. Although sources report that Hekmatyar threw acid at multiple female students, others have attributed this claim to the Soviet KGB's black propaganda. Hekmatyar's radicalism put him in confrontation with elements in the Muslim Youth surrounding Ahmad Shah Massoud, also an engineering student at Kabul University. In 1975, trying to assassinate a rival for the second time in three years, Hekmatyar with Pakistani help tried to assassinate Massoud, then 22 years old, but failed. In 1975, the "Islamic Society" split between supporters of Massoud and Burhanuddin Rabbani, who led the Jamiat-e Islami, and elements surrounding Gulbuddin Hekmatyar, who then founded the Hezb-i Islami. Akbarzadeh and Yasmeen describe Hekmatyar's approach as "radical" and antagonistic as opposed to an "inclusive" and "moderate" strategy by Rabbani.

== Exile in Pakistan ==
The arrival of Afghan opposition militants in Peshawar coincided with a period of diplomatic tension between Pakistan and Afghanistan, due to Daoud's revival of the Pashtunistan issue. Under the patronage of Pakistani General Naseerullah Babar, then governor of the Khyber Pakhtunkhwa, and with the blessing of Prime Minister Zulfikar Ali Bhutto, camps were set up to train Hekmatyar and other anti-Daoud Islamists. The Islamist movement had two main tendencies: the Jamiat-e islami ("Islamic society") led by Burhanuddin Rabbani, that advocated a gradualist strategy to gain power, through infiltration of society and the state apparatus. Rabbani advocated for the "building of a widely based movement that would create popular support". The other movement, called Hezb-i Islami ("Islamic Party"), was led by Hekmatyar, who favored a radical approach in the form of violent armed conflict. Pakistani support largely went to Hekmatyar's group, who, in October 1975, undertook to instigate an uprising against the government. Without popular support, the rebellion ended in complete failure, and hundreds of militants were arrested.

Hekmatyar's Hezb-e-Islami was formed as an elitist avant-garde based on a strictly disciplined Islamist ideology within a homogeneous organization that Olivier Roy described as "Leninist", and employed the rhetoric of the Iranian Revolution. It had its operational base in the Nasir Bagh, Worsak and Shamshatoo refugee camps in Pakistan. In these camps, Hezb-i Islami formed a social and political network and operated everything from schools to prisons, with the support of the Pakistani government and their Inter-Services Intelligence (ISI). From 1976 to 1977 Afghan President Daoud made overtures to Pakistan which led to reconciliation with Pakistani leader Bhutto. Bhutto's support to Hekmatyar, however, continued and when Bhutto was removed from power in Pakistan by Zia-ul-Haq in 1977, Zia continued supporting Hekmatyar.

== Soviet war in Afghanistan ==
During the Soviet–Afghan War, Hekmatyar received large amounts of aid from Saudi Arabia, Pakistan and the United States. Hekmatyar also gained the support of the British MI6 and even met Margaret Thatcher in Downing Street. According to the ISI, their decision to allocate the highest percentage of covert aid to Hekmatyar was based on his record as an effective anti-Soviet military commander in Afghanistan. Others describe his position as the result of having "almost no grassroots support and no military base inside Afghanistan", and thus being the much more "dependent on Pakistani President Zia-ul-Haq's protection and financial largesse" than other mujahideen factions.

Author Peter Bergen states that "by the most conservative estimates, $600 million" in American aid through Pakistan "went to the Hizb party ... Hekmatyar's party had the dubious distinction of never winning a significant battle during the war, training a variety of militant Islamists from around the world, killing significant numbers of mujahideen from other parties, and taking a virulently anti-Western line. In addition to hundreds of millions of dollars of American aid, Hekmatyar also received the lion's share of aid from the Saudis."

Hekmatyar's constant scheming against all of the mujahideen factions led Pakistani general and leader Muhammad Zia-ul-Haq to warn Hekmatyar that it was Pakistan that made him an Afghan leader and that Pakistan could and would destroy him if he resisted operational control by ISI.

== Heroin trafficking ==
As the Soviet-Afghan War was coming to its end, Hekmatyar used the funds and weapons provided to him by the CIA and ISI to establish his organization as one of the leading heroin producers in the Middle East. Hekmatyar first became involved in the narcotics trade in the summer of 1988, as it became apparent that the Soviets were intending to withdraw. Initially becoming involved in trafficking opium, Hekmatyar's was the first of the mujahideen groups to establish and operate heroin production factories in the region. Hekmatyar's involvement in the production and distribution of illegal narcotics became a subject of diplomatic embarrassment for the United States Foreign Service. The CIA officer with responsibility for its operations in Afghanistan at the time, Charles Cogan, said "Every situation has its fallout...There was fallout in terms of drugs, yes. But the main objective was accomplished."

== Warfare with other Afghan groups ==
Hezb-i Islami men are like cancer, that is why one has to treat the cancer first.
– Ahmad Shah Massoud following a truce with the Soviet Army, c. 1983

Hezb-e-Islami distinguished itself among the mujahideen by its practice of takfir, or pronouncing apostasy against other Muslims. On that basis it regularly attacked other mujahideen factions as well as the Soviet occupation. Hekmatyar's conflict with Jamiat-e Islami and its commander Ahmad Shah Massoud was particularly contentious. Massoud was arrested in Pakistan for espionage in 1976 with Hekmatyar's cooperation. Later Massoud and Hekmatyar agreed to stage a takeover operation in the Panjshir valley. Hekmatyar at the last minute refused to engage his part of the offensive, leaving Massoud open and vulnerable. Massoud's forces barely escaped with their lives. In July 1989 Hezb-e-Islami commander Sayyed Jamal ambushed and killed 30 commanders of Massoud's Shura-ye-Nazar at Farkhar in Takhar province. The attack was typical of Hekmatyar's strategy of trying to cripple rival factions, and incurred widespread condemnation among the mujahideen.

Hekmatyar's faction also attacked non-combatants such as British cameraman Andy Skrzypkowiak, who was killed in 1987 while carrying footage of Massoud's successes to the West. Despite protests from British representatives, Hekmatyar did not punish the culprits, and instead rewarded them with gifts. The same year Médecins Sans Frontières reported that Hekmatyar's guerrillas hijacked a 96-horse caravan bringing aid into northern Afghanistan, stealing a year's supply of medicine and cash that was to be distributed to villagers. This would have allowed the villagers to buy food. French relief officials also asserted that Thierry Niquet, an aid coordinator bringing cash to Afghan villagers, was killed by one of Hekmatyar's commanders in 1986. It is thought that two American journalists traveling with Hekmatyar in 1987, Lee Shapiro and Jim Lindelof, were killed not by the Soviets, as Hekmatyar's men claimed, but during a firefight initiated by Hekmatyar's forces against another mujahideen group.

Hekmatyar made an unlikely alliance with hardline communist and Minister of Defence Shahnawaz Tanai who launched a failed coup attempt in March 1990 against President Najibullah. Many senior members of his party resigned in protest of the coalition, and other Mujahideen groups ridiculed Hekmatyar for uniting with Khalqists to oust the Parcham government. In addition, there were frequent reports throughout the war of Hekmatyar's commanders negotiating and dealing with pro-Communist local militias in northern Afghanistan.

Overall, Hekmatyar has been accused of spending "more time fighting other Mujahideen than killing Soviets." Through the anti-Soviet war and beyond, he remained a controversial yet persistently influential figure whom The New York Times described as "perhaps the most brutal of a generally brutal group".

== Post-DRA civil war ==
A highly controversial commander, Hekmatyar has been dubbed the "Butcher of Kabul", accused of being responsible for the destruction and civilian deaths Kabul experienced in the early 1990s.

According to the U.S. Special Envoy to Afghanistan in 1989–1992, Peter Tomsen, Gulbuddin Hekmatyar was hired in 1990 by the Pakistani Inter-Services Intelligence (ISI) to conquer and rule Afghanistan in the benefit of Pakistani interests. The plan was delayed until 1992 due to US pressure to cancel that plan.

In April 1992, as the Democratic Republic of Afghanistan began to collapse, government officials joined the mujahideen, choosing different parties according to their ethnic and political affinities. For the most part, the members of the khalq faction of the PDPA, who were predominantly Pashtuns, joined with Hekmatyar. With their help, he began on 24 April to infiltrate troops into Kabul, and announced that he had seized the city, and that should any other leaders try to fly into Kabul, he would shoot their plane down. The new leader of the "Islamic Interim Government of Afghanistan", Sibghatullah Mojaddedi, appointed Ahmad Shah Massoud as defense minister, and urged him to take action. This he did, taking the offensive on 25 April, and after two days heavy fighting, the Hezb-i Islami and its allies were expelled from Kabul. A peace agreement was signed with Massoud on 25 May 1992, which made Hekmatyar Prime Minister. However, the agreement fell apart when he was blamed for a rocket attack on President Mojaddedi's plane. The following day, fighting resumed between Burhanuddin Rabbani's and Ahmed Shah Massoud's Jamiat, Abdul Rashid Dostum's Jumbish forces and Hekmatyar's Hezb-i Islami forces.

From 1992 to 1996, the warring factions destroyed most of Kabul and killed thousands, many of them civilians, during the Afghan civil war. All the different parties participated in the destruction, but Hekmatyar's group was responsible for most of the damage, because of his practice of deliberately targeting civilian areas. Hekmatyar is thought to have bombarded Kabul in retaliation for what he considered its inhabitants' collaboration with the Soviets, and out of religious conviction. He once told a New York Times journalist that Afghanistan "already had one and a half million martyrs. We are ready to offer as many to establish a true Islamic Republic." His attacks also had a political objective: to undermine the Rabbani government by proving that Rabbani and Massoud were unable to protect the population. In 1994 Hekmatyar would shift alliances, joining with Dostum as well as Hizb-e-Wahdat, a Hazara Shi'a party, to form the Shura-i Hamahangi ("Council of coordination"). Together they laid Siege on Kabul, unleashing massive barrages of artillery and rockets that led to the evacuation of U.N. personnel from Kabul, and caused several government members to abandon their posts. However the new alliance did not spell victory for Hekmatyar, and in June 1994, Massoud had driven Dostum's troops from the capital.

== Relations with the Taliban ==
The Pakistani military had supported Hekmatyar until then in the hope of installing a Pashtun-dominated government in Kabul, which would be friendly to their interests. By 1994, it had become clear that Hekmatyar would never achieve this, and that his extremism had antagonised most Pashtuns, so the Pakistanis began turning towards the predominantly Pashtun Taliban. After capturing Kandahar in November 1994, the Taliban made rapid progress towards Kabul, making inroads into Hezb-e Islami positions. They captured Wardak on 2 February 1995, and moved on to Maidan Shahr on 10 February and Mohammed Agha the next day. Very soon, Hekmatyar found himself caught between the advancing Taliban and the government forces, and the morale of his men collapsed. On 14 February, he was forced to abandon his headquarters at Charasiab, from where rockets were fired at Kabul, and flee in disorder to Surobi.

Nonetheless, in May 1996, Rabbani and Hekmatyar finally formed a power-sharing government in which Hekmatyar was made prime minister. Rabbani was anxious to enhance the legitimacy of his government by enlisting the support of Pashtun leaders. However, the Mahipar agreement did not bring any such benefits to him as Hekmatyar had little grassroots support, but did have many adverse effects: it caused outrage among Jamiat supporters, and among the population of Kabul, who had endured Hekmatyar's attacks for the last four years. Moreover, the agreement was clearly not what the Pakistanis wanted, and convinced them of Hekmatyar's weakness, and that they should shift their aid entirely over to the Taliban. Hekmatyar took office on 26 June, and immediately started issuing severe decrees on women's dress that struck a sharp contrast with the relatively liberal policy that Massoud had followed until then. The Taliban responded to the agreement with a further spate of rocket attacks on the capital. The Rabbani/Hekmatyar regime lasted only a few months before the Taliban took control of Kabul in September 1996. Many of the Hezb-e Islami local commanders joined the Taliban, "both out of ideological sympathy and for reason of tribal solidarity." Those that did not were expelled by the Taliban. In Pakistan, Hezb-e Islami training camps "were taken over by the Taliban and handed over" to Jamiat Ulema-e-Islam (JUI) groups such as the Sipah-e-Sahaba Pakistan (SSP). Hekmatyar then fled to Massoud's stronghold in Panjshir who, despite Hekmatyar's history of animosity towards him, helped him flee to Iran in 1997, where he is said to have resided for almost six years. Isolated from Afghanistan he is reported to have "lost ... his power base back home" to defections or inactivity of former members. He was also distrusted by the Iranian Government, who found him too unpredictable, unreliable, and an unnecessary liability, considering its tense relations at the time with the Taliban and the Pakistani government. Despite his pleas, the Iranian Revolutionary Guards refused to establish a proxy through any of his organizations or assist him in any way. Allegedly, they even cut his phone lines and turned away anyone who wished to see him in his villa in North Tehran.

== Activities in the Islamic Republic ==
After the 9/11 attacks in the United States Hekmatyar, who had allegedly "worked closely" with bin Laden in the early 1990s, declared his opposition to the US campaign in Afghanistan and criticized Pakistan for assisting the United States. After the U.S. entry into the anti-Taliban alliance and the fall of the Taliban, Hekmatyar rejected the U.N.-brokered accord of 5 December 2001 negotiated in Germany as a post-Taliban interim government for Afghanistan. As a result of pressure by the U.S. and the Karzai administration, on 10 February 2002 all the offices of Hezb-e-Islami were closed in Iran and Hekmatyar was expelled by his Iranian hosts.

The United States accused Hekmatyar of urging Taliban fighters to re-form and fight against Coalition troops in Afghanistan. He was also accused of offering bounties for those who kill U.S. troops. He has been labeled a war criminal by members of the U.S.-backed President Hamid Karzai's government. ISAF identified Hekmatyar in 2002 as the number one security threat, ahead of the Taliban or al-Qaeda. He was also a suspect behind the 5 September 2002 assassination attempt on Karzai in Kandahar and a bomb the same day that killed more than a dozen people in Kabul. That same month, he released newsletters and tape messages calling for jihad against the United States. One of his commanders commented that there "will be suicide attacks [...] against soldiers". On 25 December 2002, news broke that American spy organizations had discovered Hekmatyar attempting to join al-Qaeda. According to the news, he had said that he was available to aid them. However, in a video released by Hekmatyar 1 September 2003, he denied forming alliances with the Taliban or al-Qaeda, but praised attacks against U.S. and international forces.

On 10 February 2003, the Afghan government reported that Hekmatyar was planning an alliance with Taliban and al-Qaeda factions. His group was involved in an intense battle with the U.S. army near Spin Boldak. On February 19, 2003, the United States State Department and the United States Treasury Department jointly designated Hekmatyar a "global terrorist." This designation meant that any assets Hekmatyar held in the U.S., or held through companies based in the U.S., would be frozen. The U.S. also requested the United Nations Committee on Terrorism to follow suit, and designate Hekmatyar an associate of Osama bin Laden. In October 2003, he declared a ceasefire with local commanders in Jalalabad, Kunar, Logar and Surobi, and stated that they should only fight foreigners. Hekmatyar was classified as a terrorist organization in Canada in 2005, and is one of two individuals on Canada's list; his party Hezb-e Islami Gulbuddin was added in 2006.

In May 2006, he released a video to Al Jazeera in which he accused Iran of backing the U.S. in the Afghan conflict and said he was ready to fight alongside Osama bin Laden and blamed the ongoing conflicts in Palestine, Iraq and Afghanistan on U.S. interference. In an audiotape released the same month, he called for revolt against U.S. forces and Karzai's "puppet government", and directly threatened to kill Lt. General Karl Eikenberry. In September 2006, he was reported as captured, but the report was later retracted. In December 2006, a video was released in Pakistan, where Hekmatyar claimed "the fate Soviet Union faced is awaiting America as well." In January 2007 CNN reported that Hekmatyar claimed "that his fighters helped Osama bin Laden escape from the mountains of Tora Bora five years ago." BBC news reported a quote from a December 2006 interview broadcast on GEO TV, "We helped them [bin Laden and Zawahiri] get out of the caves and led them to a safe place."

=== 2008 resurgence ===
In May 2008, the Jamestown Foundation reported that after being "sidelined from Afghan politics" since the mid-1990s, Hekmatyar's HIG group had "recently reemerged as an aggressive militant group, claiming responsibility for many bloody attacks against Coalition forces at the time, primarily the International Security Assistance Force and the administration of President Hamid Karzai." The re-emergence of him as an "experienced guerrilla strategist" came at a propitious time for insurgency, following the killing of Taliban commander Mullah Dadullah, when some elements of the Taliban were becoming "disorganized and frustrated." HIG claimed responsibility for and is thought to have at least assisted in a 27 April 2008 attempt on the life of President Karzai in Kabul that killed three Afghan citizens, including a member of parliament. Other attacks for which it was thought to be responsible included the 2 January 2008 shooting down in Laghman province of a helicopter containing foreign troops; the shooting and forcing down of a U.S. military helicopter in Sarubi district of Kabul on 22 January; and blowing up a Kabul police vehicle in March 2008, killing 10 soldiers.

In interviews he demanded "all foreign forces to leave immediately unconditionally." Offers by President Hamid Karzai to open talks with "opponents of the government" and hints that they would be offered official posts "such as deputy minister or head of department", were thought to be directed at Hekmatyar. It was reported in 2008 that Hekmatyar lived in an unknown location in southeastern Afghanistan, close to the Pakistani border. In 2008, he denied any links with the Taliban or al-Qaeda and was even considered for prime minister. At the time, Hekmatyar was believed to shuttle between hideouts in Pakistan's mountainous tribal areas and northeast Afghanistan.

In January 2010, he was still considered one of the three main leaders of the Afghan insurgency. By then, he held out the possibility of negotiations with President Karzai and outlined a roadmap for political reconciliation. This contrasted with the views of Taliban leader Mullah Omar and allied insurgent chief Sirajuddin Haqqani, who refused any talks with Kabul as long as foreign troops remained in the country, Hekmatyar appeared less reluctant.

On 10 February 2014, Hekmatyar's HIG group executed an attack which killed two US civilians, Paul Goins and Michael Hughes, and wounded two other Americans and seven Afghan nationals. HIG was also responsible for a 16 May 2013 suicide VBIED attack in Kabul, which destroyed a US armored SUV and killed two US soldiers, four US civilian contractors, eight Afghans—including two children—and wounded at least 37 others. The attack marked the deadliest incident against US personnel in Kabul in 2013.

=== 2016 peace deal and pardon ===
On 22 September 2016, Hekmatyar was pardoned by the Afghan government as part of a peace deal between Hezb-i-Islami and the government. The deal also allowed for the release of Hezb-i-Islami prisoners and the return of Hekmatyar to public life. The deal led a group of young activists to organise a protest against the pardoning less than a mile away from the signing ceremony. Human Rights Watch called the deal "an affront to victims of grave abuses". Hezb-i-Islami agreed to cease hostilities, cut ties to extremist groups and respect the Afghan Constitution in exchange for government recognition of the group and support for the removal of United Nations and American sanctions against Hekmatyar, who was also promised an honorary post in the government.

The agreement was formalised on 29 September 2016 with both Afghan President Ashraf Ghani and Hekmatyar, who appeared via a video link in the presidential palace, signing the agreement. UN sanctions on him were formally lifted on 3 February 2017. On 4 May 2017, he returned to Kabul along with his fighters to meet President Ghani after spending two decades in hiding.

He has then called on the Taliban to end their insurgency and lay down arms. Hekmatyar ran in the 2019 Afghan presidential election and finished a distant third.

== During and after U.S. withdrawal ==
Hekmatyar and his organization are reported to have joined the Council of Reconciliation formed by the Taliban. After the Taliban's return to power he voiced in September 2021 his support for the Taliban even if he and his party will not be included in governance. In October 2022, Hekmatyar told a sermon in Kabul that the talks of Bonn (2001) and Doha (2019–2020) failed to bring peace to Afghanistan because of the influence of "foreigners". He proposed intra-Afghan talks to form an inclusive government to replace the current interim Taliban government.

In 2024, the Taliban cracked down on Hekmatyar, forcing him out of his government residence and shutting down his weekly sermons and the TV station that aired them. On December 8, 2025, it was reported that he traveled to Malaysia. In September 2026, he called upon members of Hizb-i Islami to cut any ties with the Taliban.

== Relatives ==
Some of Hekmatyar's relatives have served or are suspected of serving as his deputies.

Hekmatyar's relatives
Name	Relation	Role	Notes
Shahabuddin Hekmatyar	brother		Arrested due to his ties with Gulbuddin in August 2008. Released in January 2009.
Abdullah Shabab Hekmatyar	nephew		Son of Gulbuddin Hekmatyar's brother, Shahabuddin; Captured in 2007.
Salahuddin Hekmatyar	nephew	Director of Islamic University	Son of Gulbuddin Hekmatyar's brother, Shahabuddin
Habiburahman Hekmatyar	son	spokesman	Gave interviews describing Gulbuddin's position in peace negotiations in 2010.
Ghairat Baheer	son-in-law		A medical doctor who spent four years in CIA custody.
Jamal Jamaluddin Hikmatyar	son		Founded the Youths Reforming Organization.
Firoz Feroz Hekmatyar	son	diplomat	Represented the HiG at a peace conference in the Maldives in 2010.
Ahktar Muhammed Hekmatyar	brother		Gulbuddin's brother.
Houmayoun Jarir Jareer	son in-law		Either Gulbuddin's son-in-law, or the son-in-law of Ahktar Muhammed, Gulbuddin's brother.
Habibullah Shahab Hekmatyar	nephew		Born in 1995, he was killed by a US airstrike on April 21, 2011. He was reported to have played a role in "the jihad against US Forces".

== Books ==
Hekmatyar has been described as a "prolific writer" who, "despite rarely ceasing to fight, has authored more than 60 (reportedly 79) books on linguistics, Pashto grammar, comparative religion and political analysis." His publications include:

- Buḥrān-i mushkīlāt-i rāhhā-yi ḥal, 2000, 194 p. Politics and government in Afghanistan during 1989 to 1998, when Taliban extended their control to most parts of Afghanistan.
- Shiʻr va ʻirfān dar miḥak-i Qurʼān va shaqāyiq-i adabī, 2001, 104 p. On good and bad poetry and mysticism in light of the teachings of the Qur'an.
- Būdā az sharm furūʹnarīkht, takhrīb shud : dar pāsukh-i Makhmalbāf, 2003, 196 p. Critical study of "Būdā dar Afghānistān takhrīb nashud, az sharm furūʹrīkht" a book by prominent Iranian writer Mohsen Makhmalbaf on the history, jihad and Afghan refugees and other articles on Afghanistan.
- Tawhīd aw shirk, 2004, 254 p. On the Oneness of God and polytheism as interpreted in Qur'an.
- Da Qurʼān palwashe, 2006–2011, 8 volumes. Translation into Pashto and commentary of the Qur'an.
- Bāʼībal da Qurʼān pah raṇā ke, 2006, 871 p. Analytical study of Bible in the light of Qur'an.
- Islāmī taḥrīk : Nādirī k̲h̲ānadān ko iqtidār men̲ lāne se Rūsiyon̲ ke ink̲h̲ilāʼ tak, 2008-, multiple volumes. Historical study of Afghanistan from King Mohammed Nadir Shah regime of 1929 up to Russian withdrawal from Afghanistan in 1989.
- Rātlūnkay Islāmī niẓām bah ṡangah wī? mashar bah ʼī ṡok wī? ṡangah bah ghwarah kīẓhī?, 2009, 167 p. Government and politics according to Islamic teachings.

== Notes ==
Political offices
Preceded by Abdul Sabur Farid Kohistani	Prime Minister of Afghanistan; 1993–1994	Succeeded by Arsala Rahmani Daulat (acting)
Preceded by Ahmad Shah Ahmadzai (acting)	Prime Minister of Afghanistan; 1996–1997; Disputed by Mohammad Rabbani from September 1996; Reason for dispute: Afghan Civil War (1996–2001)	Succeeded by Abdul Rahim Ghafoorzai (Islamic State)
Preceded by Ahmad Shah Ahmadzai (acting)	Prime Minister of Afghanistan; 1996–1997; Disputed by Mohammad Rabbani from September 1996; Reason for dispute: Afghan Civil War (1996–2001)	Succeeded by Mohammad Rabbani (Islamic Emirate)
