= Satellite Town, Quetta =

Satellite Town
- Town
- Location within Pakistan
- Coordinates: 30°10′52″N 67°01′59″E
- Country: Pakistan
- Province: Balochistan
- District: Quetta District
- Time zone: UTC+5 (PST)

Satellite Town is an upscale neighborhood and residential suburb located in the city of Quetta in Balochistan, Pakistan. The town is situated adjacent to the University of Balochistan and the headquarters of the Geological Survey of Pakistan.

== See also ==
- Quetta
