= Jamiat-i Islami Afghanistan =

Primarily Tajik political party in Afghanistan

Jamiat-i Islami Afghanistan جمعیت اسلامی افغانستان
- Emblem of the party
- Chairman of the Political Bureau: Salahuddin Rabbani
- Military commander: Ahmad Shah Massoud X (1972–2001); Mohammad Fahim (2001–2014); Atta Muhammad Nur (Northern Region); Ismail Khan (Western Region)
- Founder: Burhanuddin Rabbani X
- Founded: 1972 (possibly 1960s)
- Headquarters: Fayzabad (1972–1992; 2000–2001); Kabul (1992–1996); Taloqan (1996–2000)
- Ideology: Islamic democracy; Communitarism; Moderate progressivism
- Political position: Centre
- Religion: Sunni Islam
- Colours: Green; White
- Seats in the House of the People: 0 / 249

Party flag

Website
- jamiat-e-islami.org

Jamiat-i Islami Afghanistan
- جمعیت اسلامی افغانستان
- Founder: Burhanuddin Rabbani
- Dates active: 1972–1989 (Paramilitary); 1979–1989 (Part of Afghan Mujahideen); 1989–1992 (1st government as Interim); 1992–2001 (2nd government); 2001–2021 (as political party)
- Country: Afghanistan
- Groups: Primarily Tajiks; Minority Uzbeks and Pashtuns
- Part of: Afghan Mujahideen (1979–1989); Interim Afghan Government (1989–1992); Islamic State of Afghanistan (1992–2001); (Afghanistan) Northern Alliance (1996–2001)

Jamiat-i Islami Afghanistan (Dari: جمعیت اسلامی افغانستان, lit. 'Islamic Society of Afghanistan'), often shortened to the Jamiat, is a predominantly Afghan Tajik political party and former paramilitary organisation in Afghanistan. It was the largest functioning paramilitary in Afghanistan, with 5,000 cadres and 30,000 supporters, and was originally formed as a student political society at Kabul University.

It has a communitarian ideology based on Islamic law. During the Soviet–Afghan War and the subsequent First Afghan Civil War against the communist government, Jamiat-i Islami was one of the most powerful of the Afghan mujahideen groups. Burhanuddin Rabbani led the party (including its predecessors) from 1968 to 2011, and served as President of the Islamic State of Afghanistan from 1992 to 2001, in exile from 1996.

== History ==
=== Early years ===
Jamiat "emerged" in 1972 from among "the informal Islamist groupings that had existed since the 1960s". Led by Burhanuddin Rabbani, a professor of Islamic theology at Kabul University, it was inspired by Abu al-A'la Mawdudi and his Jamaat-e-Islami Pakistan (JIP).

When Rabbani's arrest was ordered by Mohammad Daoud Khan in 1973, it was to Pakistan that Rabbani fled, and Jamaat-e-Islami who initially hosted him there. Pakistan also backed Jamiat-i Islami's uprising in the Panjshir Valley in 1975. Later Jamiat lost the backing of Jamaat-e-Islami to the more conservative Hizb-i Islami.

In Pakistan, Professor Rabbani gathered important people and continued to build the party. Sayed Noorullah Emad, who was then a young Muslim at Kabul University became its general secretary and, later, its deputy chief. Some of its prominent commanders included Ustad Zabihullah, Gulbuddin Hekmatyar, Ahmad Shah Massoud, Ismail Khan, Atta Muhammad Nur, Mullah Naqibullah and Fazlullah Mujadedi. Ahmad Shah Massoud directed the military wing of the party.

=== Massoud–Hekmatyar split ===
Ahmad Shah Massoud and Gulbuddin Hekmatyar were both early followers of Rabbani, being Kabul University students at the time. Hekmatyar broke away from Jamiat in 1976 to found his own party: Hezb-e Islami.

The two groups formed the two main tendencies of the Islamist movement in Afghanistan, and after the April 1978 coup and the brutality of the invading Soviet Army, the two strongest Afghan mujahideen groups in the 1980s.

==== Jamiat ====
Rabbani and the Jamiat advocated "building of a widely based movement that would create popular support", a gradualist strategy of infiltration of society and the state apparatus to gain power. Jamiat was dominated by Tajiks but had a greater `tribal and regional cross section` than other groups, and was willing to seek "common ground" with non-Islamists. It gained prominence because of the battlefield success of Ahmad Shah Massoud.

==== Hezb-i Islami ====
Hezb-i Islami was overwhelmingly Ghilzai Pashtun, and backed by Pakistan president Zia ul-Haq. Its leader, Hekmatyar, was "implacably hostile to any form of compromise" favouring violent armed conflict. As a result, Hezb-i Islami, and not Jamiat, gained the support of the Muslim Brotherhood, Jamaat-e-Islami Pakistan, and Saudi Arabian networks.

=== Soviet invasion ===
After the Soviet invasion in Afghanistan in 1979, Massoud organised a mujahideen group in Parwan Province to fight against the Communist government and their Soviet allies. The group got little support from Pakistan and the United States, however the United Kingdom covertly supported, supplied and trained the group during the war.

=== Battles between Jamiat and Hezb-i Islami ===
After the withdrawal of the Soviet troops in 1989, the mujahideen groups continued to wear down government forces. However they also fought among each other: in June 1990, battles between Jamiat and Gulbuddin's Hezb in Logar and Parwan caused hundreds of casualties on each side.

=== 1991–2001 ===
In 1991, Jamiat's forces participated in the Gulf War fighting against Ba'athist Iraq.

In 1992, the communist government collapsed entirely. Jamiat's forces were among the first to enter Kabul. Meanwhile, a peace and power-sharing agreement among the leadership of the Afghan political party leaders led to a tentative agreement to appoint Burhanuddin Rabbani, who had spent the civil war in exile, as interim president. The peace agreement was called the Peshawar Accord. Gulbuddin Hekmatyar however, did not support the peace agreement despite the fact that he was repeatedly offered the position of prime minister. Subsequently, his Hezb-i Islami attacked the new interim government and the capital of Kabul with tens of thousands of rockets.

As Hezb-i Wahdat and Ittihad-i Islami started a second war in 1992 and Dostum's Junbish-i Milli joined Hekmatyar in 1994, Kabul witnessed a gruesome war with massive civilian casualties and destruction of much of the city. In 1995 the Islamic State of Afghanistan government also with Jamiat forces retained control of Kabul, pushing back a coalition of Hekmatyar's Hezb-i Islami, the Hizb-i-Wahdat and Abdul Rashid Dostum's Jumbish-i-Milli Islami.

By 1995, the Taliban, which had seized control of much of southern Afghanistan with comparative ease the previous year, were advancing on Kabul. Jamiat rejected Taliban demands that they surrender, and the Taliban rejected Jamiat's offer to join a peaceful political process leading towards a general election. In March 1995, Massoud handed the Taliban their first major loss, however, with the aid of Saudi and Pakistani backing, they regrouped and launched and offensive in mid-1996. Massoud ordered the retreat of his troops among them Jamiat to avoid another bloodbath.

Following the capture of Kabul by the Taliban, the major mujahideen factions put aside their feuds and formed the United Islamic Front for the Salvation of Afghanistan (the United Front), commonly known in the west as the Northern Alliance, with Rabbani, officially becoming its political leader. Other Jamiat members took up senior positions within the United Front government: Yunus Qanuni served as Interior Minister and Dr. Abdullah became Foreign Minister, for example.

On 9 September 2001, just two days before the September 11 attacks in the United States, Massoud was assassinated by two suicide bombers, probably at the instigation of al-Qaeda. Immediately afterwards Taliban forces launched a major offensive against United Front positions. Mohammed Qasim Fahim was chosen to succeed Massoud as leader of Jamiat's military wing and repulsed the Taliban offensive. With extensive assistance from an American-led coalition in October and November 2001 (see War in Afghanistan (2001–2021)), United Front forces recaptured most of Afghanistan.

=== Post 2001 ===
Jamiat's founder and leader, Burhanuddin Rabbani, was assassinated in 2011. His son, Salahuddin Rabbani, has since led the party. The Jamiets were considered to be one of the largest and most influential parties during the Islamic Republic of Afghanistan era.

== See also ==
- List of Islamic political parties
- Gholam Mohammad Niazi
- Mohammad Zabihullah
- Panah Khan Panjshiri

== Sources ==
- Ahmad Shah Mas’ud (1953–2001)
