= Kabul University =

University in Kabul, Afghanistan

Coordinates: 34°31′4″N 69°7′41″E

- دانشگاه کابل / د کابل پوهنتون
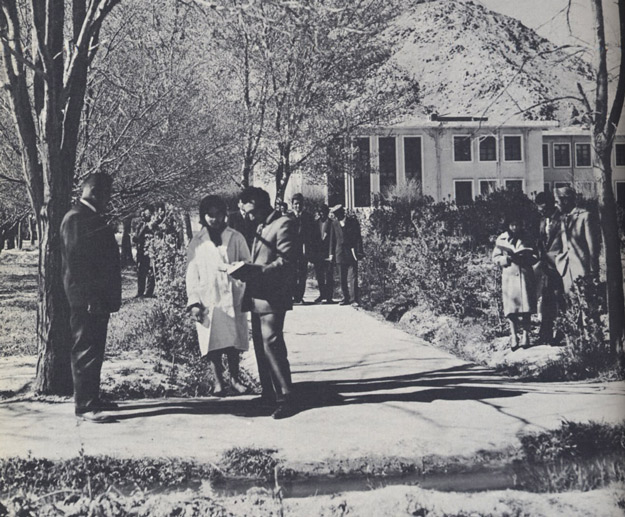
- Motto: Excellence in Service to Afghanistan
- Established: November 1932 (93 years ago)
- Chancellor: Osama Aziz
- Students: 22,000
- Location: Kabul, Afghanistan
- Nickname: KU
- Website: www.ku.edu.af

Kabul University (Note: Pashto: د کابل پوهنتون Dari: دانشگاه کابل) (KU) is a university located in Kabul province, Afghanistan. It is in the 3rd District of the capital Kabul near the Ministry of Higher Education. Kabul University is a prominent and prestigious institution and one of the oldest in terms of higher education in Afghanistan. It was founded in 1931 by King Mohammed Nadir Shah, whose prime minister at the time was his younger brother, Sardar Mohammad Hashim Khan. Approximately 22,000 students attend Kabul University. In August 2021, before the Taliban takeover, nearly half were female.

== History ==
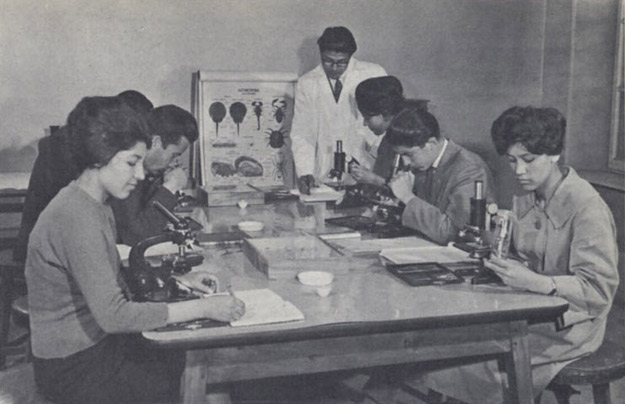
Biology class during the late 1950s or early 1960s

=== Early history ===
Kabul University was established in 1932 during the reign of King Mohammed Nadir Shah and during the government of Prime Minister Mohammad Hashim Khan, opening its doors one year later to students from across the country. It benefitted from partnerships with the governments of Turkey, France, Germany, and the United States.

The first Faculty of Medicine in Kabul was established by a group of Turkish professors of Medicine and Surgery led by Kamil Rıfkı Urga in 1932 in the region of Aliabad. The first teaching-university hospital, the Aliabad Hospital, was also built here on the campus under the guidance and supervision of Turkish architects and teaching physicians. In 1936, the Faculty of Law & Political Sciences on the same campus was established by Turkish Mehmed Ali Dağpınar. The Faculty of Law started to enroll students of law.

The first attending Turkish professors of medicine and surgery who had gone to Afghanistan under an official agreement between the governments of Afghanistan and the Turkish Republic served at Kabul University between 1932 and 1952. The first president (rector) of Kabul University and dean of the Faculty of Medicine was a Turkish surgeon and anatomist, Urga, who taught medicine and surgery for a period of 17 years with 15 other Turkish physicians. Later on, some additional teaching staff, including French professor Pierre Bolange, attended as the dean of the Faculty of Medicine after the previous Turkish dean, Zuhtu Bey, left Kabul for Ankara in 1952. The first nine graduates of the Faculty of Medicine played significant roles in Afghanistan's university community reforms; two of them were Muhammad Yusuf (the prime minister) and Fattah Najeem.

Initially, the university accepted only male students, but in 1950, it was opened to women as well.

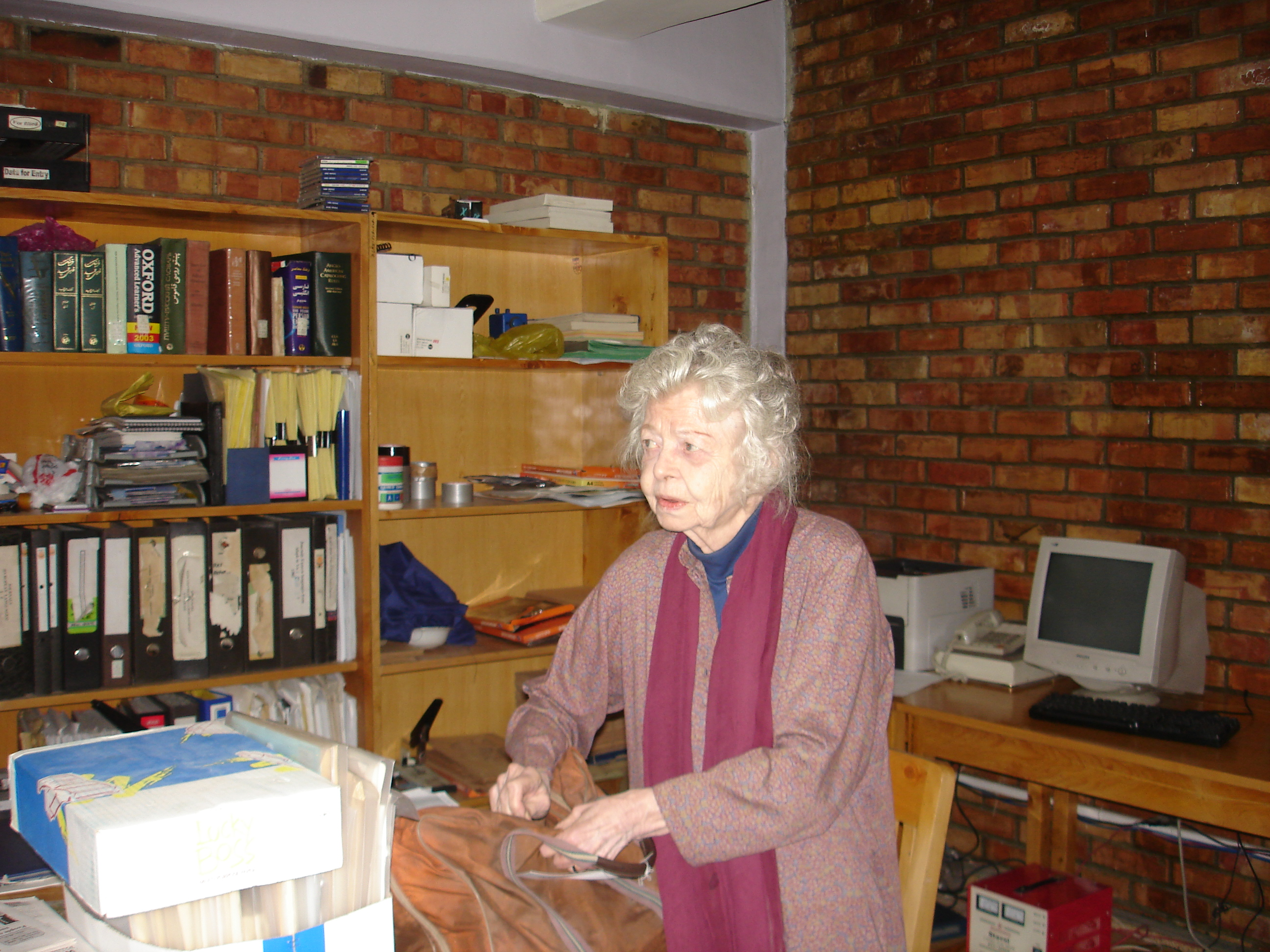
Nancy Dupree was the director of the Afghan Center at Kabul University (ACKU) starting in 1962

In the 1960s, foreign-educated scholars populated the campus. Notable students influenced during this era included Ahmad Shah Massoud, Gulbuddin Hekmatyar, Dr. Faiz Ahmad, and Saydal Sokhandan. Many different political groups were influenced by the university, such as Khalqists, Parchamites, Sholayees, and Ikhwanists. In a clash between Ikhwanis and Sholayees, a poet named Saydal Sokhandan was killed by Hekmatyar in June 1972. Saydal was fired upon and shot by Gulbuddin during an argument.

During the governance of the People's Democratic Party of Afghanistan (PDPA), Kabul University lost several lecturers and staff. The majority of the university's faculty left during the ten-year period of unrest or civil war that followed the fall of the PDPA government in 1992. The area around the university and Karte Char was a major battleground in the Afghan Civil War (1992–1996).

=== 2001–2021 ===
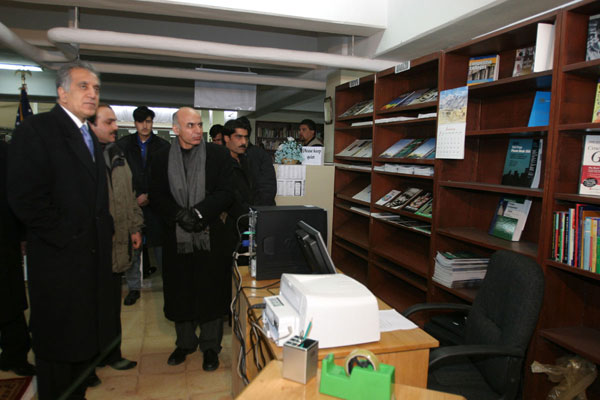
Zalmay Khalilzad and Ashraf Ghani visiting Kabul University in 2005

After the removal of the Taliban government in late 2001, the international community focused on rebuilding the educational institutions in Afghanistan. By January 2004 the campus had only 24 computers. As part of its recovery program, the university has established partnerships with four foreign universities, including Purdue University and the University of Arizona. Furthermore, the Information Technology Center was founded in 2002 with the cooperation of German Academic Exchange Service (DAAD) and Technische Universität Berlin. The number of students in higher education had increased across the country from 22,717 in 2002 to 56,451 in 2008. By 2008, Kabul University was attended by 9,660 students, 2,336 (24%) of them being women.

It was reported in 2007 that Iran donated funds to the university's dentistry faculty and donated 25,000 books. The main library of Kabul University, which was built by the United States. It is equipped with computers, books and magazines. Nancy Dupree, wife of Louis Dupree, was the Director of the Afghanistan Center at the university.

In 2008, the campus of Kabul University was provided with local network facilities by the Information Technology center of Kabul University (ITCK). Each building is connected to the campus network and is provided with the internet connection from a fiber optic backbone. The voice over IP (VoIP) technology was also part of the networking project.

At the beginning of 2020, Chancellor Babury has introduced a new program for the change and development of Kabul University.

On 19 July 2019, a car bomb exploded outside the university. It killed 8 people and injured another 33.

ISIL gunmen attacked the university on 2 November 2020, killing 35 and wounding 56. The attack occurred at around 11:00. Afghan security officials claimed they have arrested the person who instigated the attack. The three gunmen were killed by Afghan and American forces who came to the scene.

=== Since 2021 ===
Following the Fall of Kabul (2021), the university fell under Taliban control. The Taliban replaced Chancellor Mohammad Osman Babury, a longtime KU professor and expert on medicinal plants, with Mohammad Ashraf Ghairat, a Taliban fighter and former journalism student. Critics noted that Ghairat had no qualifications beyond running a small madrassah, and believes he was installed for his loyalty to the Taliban. At least 70 faculty members at the university resigned following Ghairat's installation, with the remainder demanding the Taliban rescind the installation. Ghairat had pledged to "rid Kabul University of Western and infidel thoughts" and to impose a policy of segregation, stating, "As long as real Islamic environment is not provided for all, women will not be allowed to come to universities or work. Islam first."

In October 2021, Ghairat was replaced by Osama Aziz, who holds a doctorate in Islamic Jurisprudence (Sharia law). As of December 2021 classes were still suspended and research at the university had come to a standstill. Faizullah Jalal, a university worker and a critic of the Taliban, was arrested in 2022.

Kabul University reopened on 26 February 2022, with female students attending in the morning and males in the afternoon. Other than the closure of the music department, few changes to the curriculum were reported.

In December 2022, Kabul University banned women from attending like other public universities in Afghanistan, to comply with the Taliban's education ban on women. In March 2023, women protested outside of the university's entrance by reading their books.

== Allegations of discrimination and restrictions (since 2021) ==
Following the return of the Taliban to power in August 2021, Kabul University has been the subject of multiple reports concerning restrictions on academic freedom and allegations of discriminatory practices affecting students and faculty.

According to student accounts and media reports, university authorities introduced a compulsory pledge requiring adherence to specified interpretations of Islamic law and behavioral codes (Sharia law). Reported provisions include observance of religious practices, prescribed dress codes, and restrictions on activities such as listening to music, photography, and unsupervised movement on campus. The pledge also requires students to affirm obedience to governing authorities and prohibits contact with political organizations.

Concerns have also been raised regarding provisions related to religious identity. Some reports indicate that the pledge requires adherence to Sunni Islam, particularly the Hanafi school, and may discourage or exclude other Islamic sects. Students identifying with Shia or other minority traditions have stated that such measures limit religious expression within the university. These developments have been linked by observers to broader policies under the Taliban, which, according to the United States Commission on International Religious Freedom and the Asian Forum for Human Rights and Development, have included restrictions on religious plurality and the marginalization of non-Sunni communities in Afghanistan

Changes to academic curricula have also been reported, including the removal or revision of material in disciplines such as social sciences, philosophy, political studies, and the arts.

Policies affecting women's access to education have had a significant impact on the university. Restrictions introduced by Taliban authorities have led to the suspension of women's access to higher education nationwide, preventing female students from attending the university.

University officials affiliated with the Taliban administration, including Mohammad Ashraf Ghairat, have defended these measures as necessary to align education with Islamic principles and national values.

== Structure ==
- The Faculty of Environment Science has three departments: Department of Environmental Protection, Department of Natural Resources and Management and Department of Natural Disaster Management.
- The Faculty of Law and Political Sciences has four departments: Department of Public Law, Department of Criminal Law, Department of Private Law and Department of International Relations.
- The Faculty of Computer Science has four departments: Software Engineering Department, Computer Science Department, Information Technology Department and Information System Department.
- The Faculty of Economics has two shifts students (day and night), five active departments, three future planned departments. The day shifts' departments are: Finance Department, Enterprise Management Department, Econometric and Statistic Department, National Economies Department, Management Information Systems Department, Counting Department (Future Plan), Money and Banking Department (Future Plan) and Economic Development Department (Future Plan). The night shifts' departments are: Finance Department, Enterprise Management Department and National Economics Department.
- The Faculty of Science has four departments: Department of Biology, Department of Mathematics, Department of Chemistry and Department of Physics.
- The Faculty of Engineering has six departments: Department of Mechanical Engineering, Department of Electrical & Electronics Engineering, Department of Architectural Engineering, Department of Energy Engineering, Department of Civil Engineering and Department of Urban Planning and Design. The Faculty offers a master program in Electrical and Electronics Engineering.

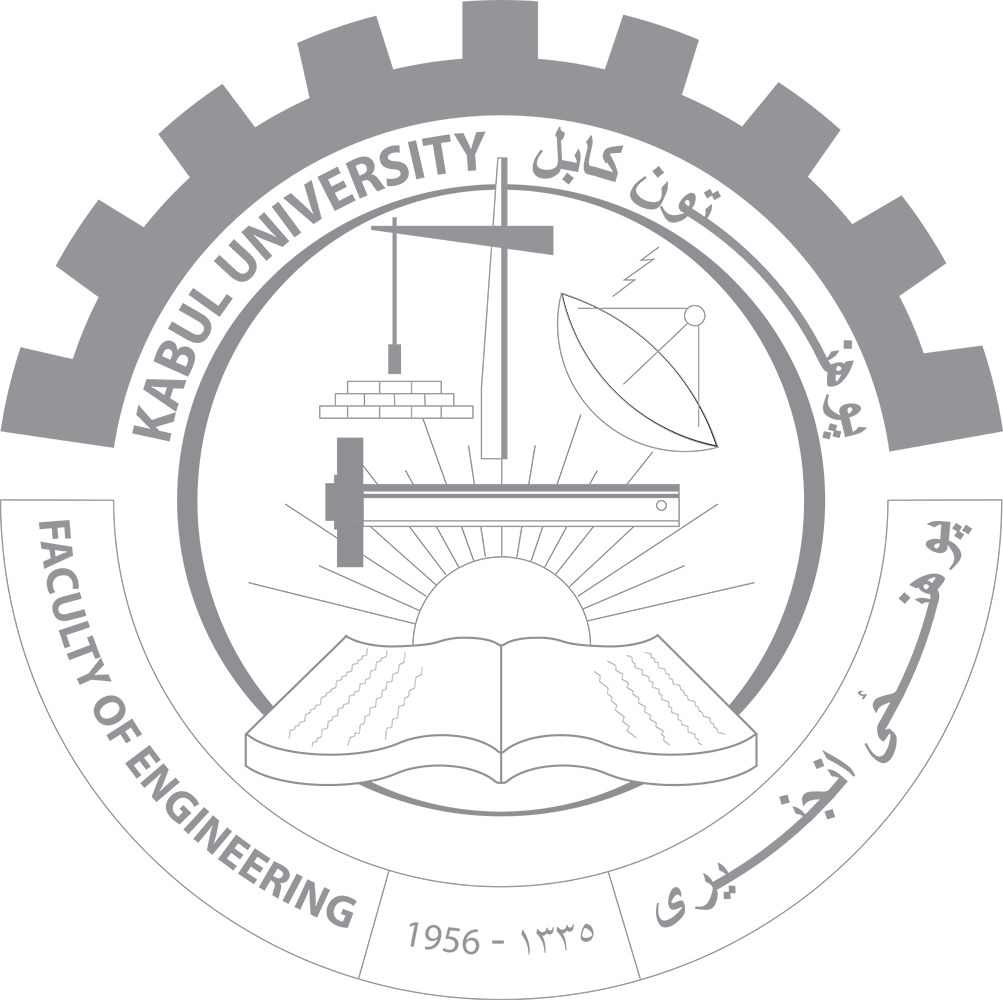
Kabul University Engineering Faculty

- The Faculty of Pharmacy has five departments: Department of Pharmacology-Toxicology, Department of Pharmaceutics, Department of Pharmacognosy, Department of Microbiology and Department of Biochemistry-Nutrition. It has eight laboratories. An estimated 400 students are taking classes there.
- The Faculty of Agriculture has eight departments: Agronomy Department, Economics and Agricultural Extension Department, Forestry & Natural Resources Department, Department of Biotechnology and Seed Production, Department of Animal Sciences, Department of Soil Science and Irrigation, Horticulture Department, and Plant Protection Department.
- The Faculty of Veterinary Medicine has five departments: Department of Animal Production, Department of Para Clinic, Department of Clinic, Department of Preclinical, and Department of Food Hygiene and Technology.
- The Faculty of Journalism has two departments: Radio &TV Department and Press Department.
- The Allama Iqbal Faculty of Arts built at a cost of around $10 million by neighboring country Pakistan, was established in 2010. The building contains 28 classrooms, two seminar halls, a library, two computer labs, and 20 faculty offices. It covers an area of 143,379 square feet (13,320.3 m^{2}). Afghan and Pakistani officials inaugurated the building in July 2010.
- The Faculty of Language and Literature has ten departments: Pashto Language and Literature Department, Dari Language and Literature Department, The English Department, Russian Language Department, German Language Department, Turkish Language Department, Department of French Language, Arabic Language Department, Spanish Language Department and Chinese Language Department.
- The Faculty of Fine Arts have six departments: Sculpture Department, Painting Department, Graphic Department, Theatre Department, Music Department, Playwright and Screenwriting Department.
- The Faculty of Islamic Studies have eight departments: Religious Jurisprudence, Principles of Islamic Jurisprudence, Belief and Philosophy, Narrations of Prophet, Interpretation of Quran, Manner and Eloquence, Preaching of Islam and Islamic Culture.
- The Faculty of Social Science have three departments: Archaeology and Anthropology Department, Philosophy Department and History Department.
- Psychology and Educational Science Faculty has six departments: Education, Psychology, Administration, Management, Advisor and Instruction.

== National Centre for Policy Research ==
The National Centre for Policy Research was established at Kabul University by the Ministry of Higher Education and Konrad Adenauer Foundation in 2003, and includes faculty in the departments of Law and Politics, Economics, and Social Science.

== Library ==
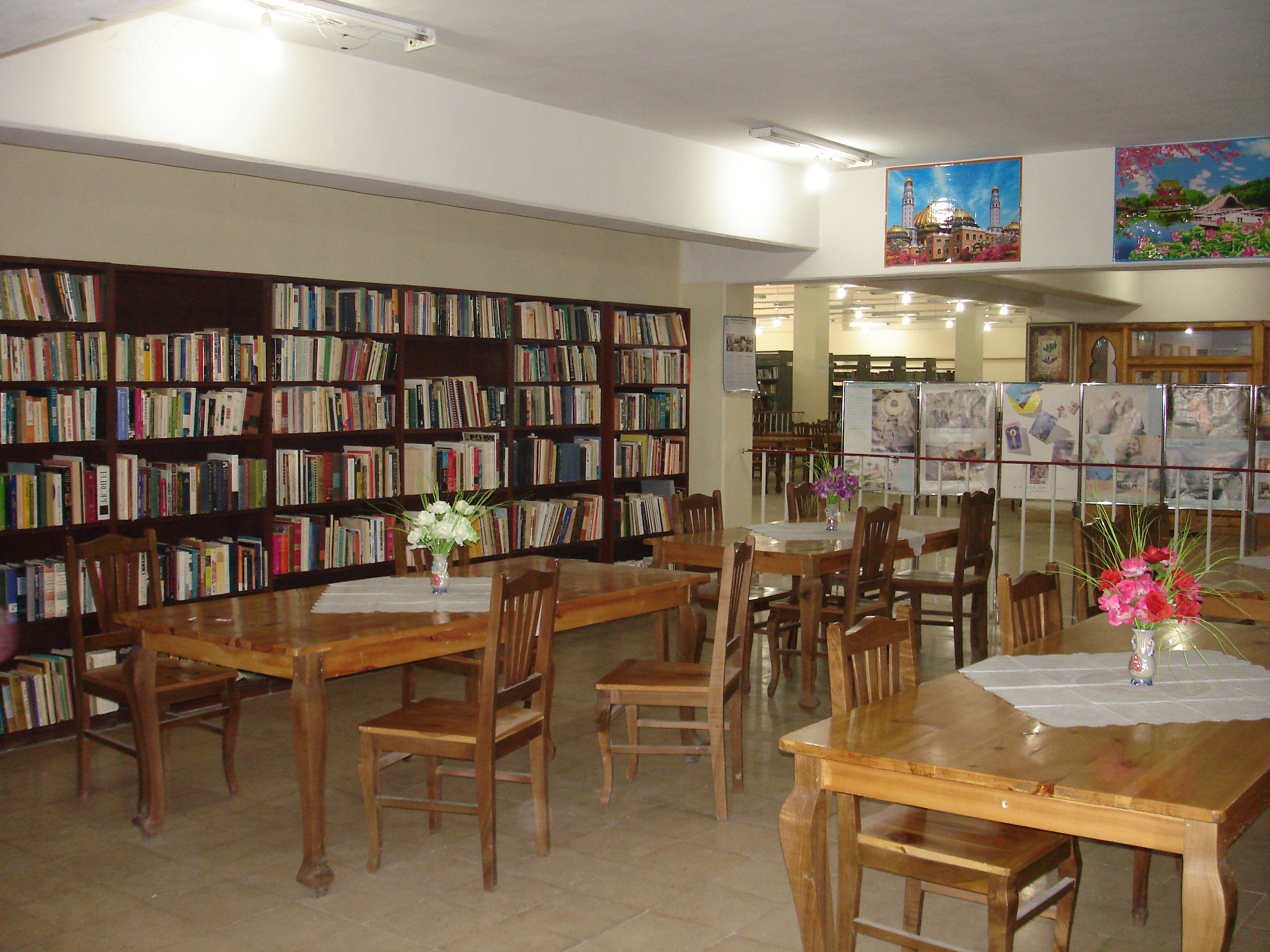
Inside the university's Central Library in 2008

In 1992, the library held 200,000 books, 5,000 manuscripts, 3,000 rare books, periodicals, photographs, and calligraphic specimens. Following a civil war, most materials were sold in book markets, burnt, destroyed, or lost. It served as the National Library of Afghanistan.

== Notable alumni ==
Notable graduates and former faculty of Kabul University include:

- Former Dean of Islamic law at Kabul University Gholam Mohammad Niazi
- Former Afghan Prime Minister Mohammad Yusuf
- Former Afghan Prime Minister Mohammad Hashim Maiwandwal
- Former Afghan Prime Minister Mohammad Musa Shafiq
- Former Afghan Marxist head of state Hafizullah Amin
- Former head of KAM Assadullah Amin
- Editor-in-Chief of national newspaper (1970s) Hafiz Sahar
- Afghan politician Tahir Badakhshi
- Afghan ambassador to Austria and former Afghan ambassador to Nordic countries Manizha Bakhtari
- Afghan poet Wasef Bakhtari
- Afghan activist Hamida Barmaki
- American archaeologist Nancy Dupree
- Former President of Afghanistan Babrak Karmal
- Former President of Afghanistan Mohammad Najibullah
- Afghan Marxist politician Anahita Ratebzad
- Former President of Afghanistan Nur Muhammad Taraki
- Former President of Afghanistan Burhanuddin Rabbani
- Former Afghan guerilla and military leader Ahmad Shah Massoud
- Afghan poet Khalida Furugh
- Afghan author and women's rights activist Farida Ahmadi
- Canadian refugee advocate Nasrin Husseini
- Afghan journalist Torpekai Amarkhel

== See also ==
- List of Islamic educational institutions
- Education in Afghanistan
- List of universities in Afghanistan
