= Afghan Civil War (1992–1996) =

Civil war in Afghanistan (1992–1996)

Second Afghan Civil War
- Part of the Afghan conflict and the Iran–Saudi Arabia proxy war (Dec. 1992–1995)
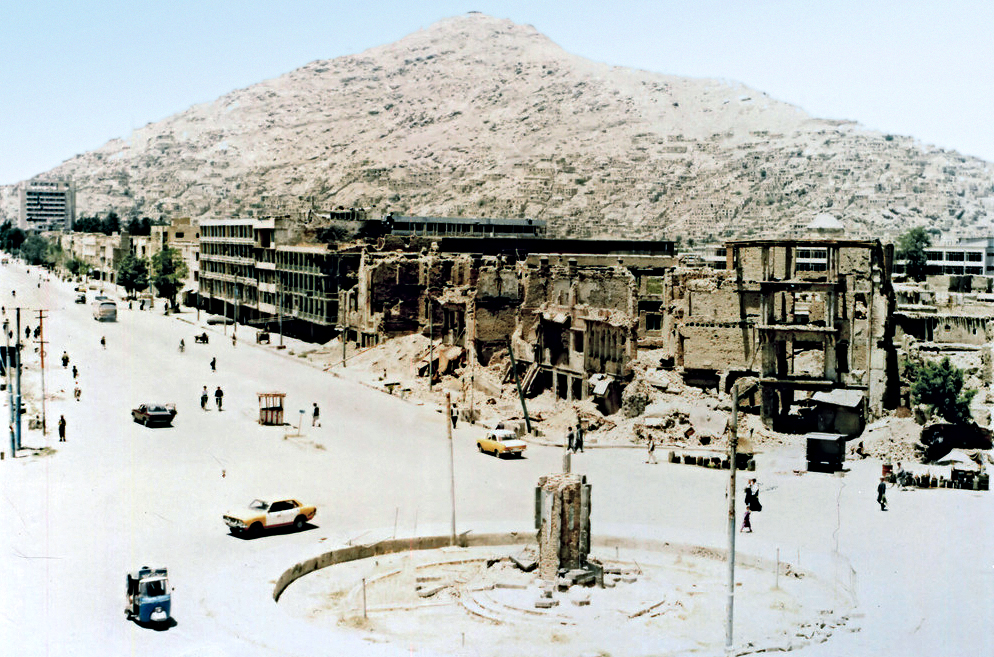
- A picture of Kabul's city center, Jada-e Maiwand, depicting the widespread destruction of city's infrastructure caused by the war, c. 1993.
Date	28 April 1992 – 27 September 1996 (4 years, 4 months, 4 weeks and 2 days)
Location	Afghanistan
Result	Military stalemate in northern Afghanistan; Taliban take control of Kabul and most of Afghanistan; Islamic Emirate of Afghanistan established; Thousands of civilians killed, millions driven from their homes, Kabul heavily damaged; Grave mistreatment of civilians (murder, rape, looting, extortion); Civil war continues (1996–2001)

Belligerents
Islamic State of Afghanistan: Northern Alliance; Jamiat-e Islami; NIFA; IDOA; Harakat-i Islami; Junbish-i Milli (until Jan 1994; from Aug 1994); Hezb-i Wahdat (from 1995); Shura-e Nazar; Hezb-e Islami Khalis (until mid-1992); INRMA; ANFL (Jebh-e Nejat-e Melli)	Hezb-e Islami Gulbuddin (until late 1994): Junbish-i Milli (Jan – Aug 1994) (sometimes); Hezb-i Wahdat (Dec 1992–1995) (sometimes)	
Islamic State of Afghanistan: Northern Alliance; Jamiat-e Islami; NIFA; IDOA; Harakat-i Islami; Junbish-i Milli (until Jan 1994; from Aug 1994); Hezb-i Wahdat (from 1995); Shura-e Nazar; Hezb-e Islami Khalis (until mid-1992); INRMA; ANFL (Jebh-e Nejat-e Melli); Hezb-e Islami Gulbuddin (from late 1994)		Taliban (from late 1994); Al-Qaeda (from early 1996)

Commanders and leaders
Burhanuddin Rabbani; Ahmad Shah Massoud; Naqib Alikozai; Ismail Khan; Mulavi Younas Khalis; Abdul Haq; Haji Abdul Qadeer; Jalaluddin Haqqani; (Afghanistan) Abdul Rasul Sayyaf; (Afghanistan) Mohammad Nabi; (Afghanistan) Sibghatullah Mojaddedi; Ahmed Gailani; Abdul Rahim Wardak; (Afghanistan) Asif Mohseni; (Afghanistan) Hussain Anwari; Abdul Ali Mazari X; Sayyid Ali Beheshti; Karim Khalili; Commander Shafi X; Abdul Rashid Dostum; Gulbuddin Hekmatyar (from late 1994)	Gulbuddin Hekmatyar (until late 1994); Abdul Rashid Dostum (sometimes); Abdul Ali Mazari (sometimes); (Taliban) Mullah Omar; (Taliban) Abdul Ghani Baradar; (al-Qaeda) Osama bin Laden; (al-Qaeda) Ayman al-Zawahiri	

Casualties and losses
- 26,759 killed (per UCDP )

The 1992–1996 Afghan Civil War, also known as the Second Afghan Civil War, took place between 28 April 1992 — the date a new interim Afghan government was supposed to replace the Republic of Afghanistan of President Mohammad Najibullah—and the Taliban's occupation of Kabul establishing the Islamic Emirate of Afghanistan on 27 September 1996.

The war immediately followed the 1989–1992 civil war with the Mujahideen victory and dissolution of the Republic of Afghanistan in April 1992. Hezb-e Islami Gulbuddin, led by Gulbuddin Hekmatyar and supported by Pakistan's Inter-Services Intelligence (ISI), refused to form a coalition government and tried to seize Kabul with the help of Khalqists. On 25 April 1992 fighting broke out between three, and later five or six, mujahideen armies. Alliances between the combatants were transitory throughout the war.

The Taliban, a new militia created and supported by Pakistan and ISI, became dominant in 1995–96. It captured Kandahar in late-1994, Herat in 1995, Jalalabad in early-September 1996, and Kabul by late-September 1996. The Taliban fought the newly-formed Northern Alliance in the subsequent 1996–2001 civil war.

Kabul's population fell from 2,000,000 to 500,000 during the 1992–1996 war; 500,000 fled during the first four months. The war was a period of intense conflict and suffering for the people of Afghanistan. The collapse of the Soviet-backed government, ethnic and religious divisions, and external involvement all contributed to the conflict. The legacy of this period of Afghan history continues to shape the country's politics and society today.

== Background ==
In 1978, Afghanistan's government was dissolved and replaced by a socialist one, the Democratic Republic of Afghanistan, which was backed by the socialist Soviet Union. In the Soviet–Afghan War (1979–1989), the mostly non-Muslim Soviets invaded Muslim-majority Afghanistan to protect the government. A multi-ethnic group of Afghan Muslims formed the Afghan mujahideen, and fought the Soviets as jihadists; those who engage in jihad, struggle in the name of Islam, are called mujahideen.

=== 1989–1992 civil war ===
In 1989, the Soviets withdrew from Afghanistan, leaving the Democratic Republic, led by president Mohammad Najibullah, less protected in the face of the Afghan mujahideen. The mujahideen continued their resistance, and claimed Sibgatullah Mojaddedi, from Peshawar, Pakistan, as their head of their government-in-exile. This began a civil war that ended in 1992.

The Soviets still gave aid to Najibullah until 1991; as the Soviet Union collapsed, it decided to cease the aid. In March 1992, mujahideen forces—including a major force of Jamiet e-Islami (Jamiat) troops, commanded by Ahmad Shah Massoud— stormed Afghanistan's capital, Kabul. Najibullah agreed to resign. Various mujahideen groups were involved in negotiations to form a coalition government to replace the Democratic Republic.

Through the Afghan mujahideen's existence, the groups received aid from the United States, Saudi Arabia, and Pakistan's Inter-Services Intelligence (ISI); one group that was not involved in the negotiations, Hezb-e Islami Gulbuddin, led by Gulbuddin Hekmatyar, had been given a disproportionate amount. Soon after Najibullah's resignation, Hezb-e Islami Gulbuddin announced its intent to conquer Kabul alone. Hekmatyar moved his troops into Kabul, and was allowed into the town soon after 17 April 1992.

=== End of the Democratic Republic of Afghanistan ===
Jamiat and another mujahideen group, Shura-e Nazar, entered Kabul on 24 April, to prevent Hekmatyar from taking over the city and the country. They fought to push Hezb-e Islami Gulbuddin out of the city over the next few days. Meanwhile, on the 26th, several mujahideen groups agreed to the Peshawar Accords, which proclaimed the establishment of the Islamic State of Afghanistan, a government mostly based on Islamic law. The Democratic Republic was officially dissolved. The accords decided that Mojaddedi would be the government's president for two months, until being succeeded by Burhanuddin Rabbani, leader of Jamiat. After Rabbani served four months, he would be succeeded by another leader, chosen at that point by a Shura. Massoud was made Afghanistan's Minister of Defense.

Hekmatyar had asked groups beside Hezb-e Islami Gulbuddin, such as Hezb-i Islami Khalis and Harakat-Inqilab-i-Islami, to join his group in entering Kabul; they declined his offer and instead backed the Peshawar Accords. Starting on the 24th, many officials of the then-Democratic Republic joined Jamiat and Shura-e Nazar's fight, including Deputy Defense Minister Mohammed Nabi Azimi, and the commander of Kabul's garrison, General Abdul Wahid Baba Jan. Hezb-e Islami Gulbuddin was pushed out of Kabul to the south by 27 April, with little damage to the city. Other mujahideen groups had joined the fight against them by then, including Junbish-i Milli (Junbish), Hezbe Wahdat, Ittehad-e Islami (Ittehad), and Harakat-i-Inqilab-i-Islami (Harakat) Former government soldiers and police either declared their allegiance to Massoud's government, these various groups, or went south to Hezb e-Islami. Some deserted. Peace in the city lasted for a short amount of time, as the mujahideen groups in it started being disunited, and Hekmatyar still wanted power.

== Main participants ==
=== Islamic State of Afghanistan ===
==== Jamiat-e Islami ====
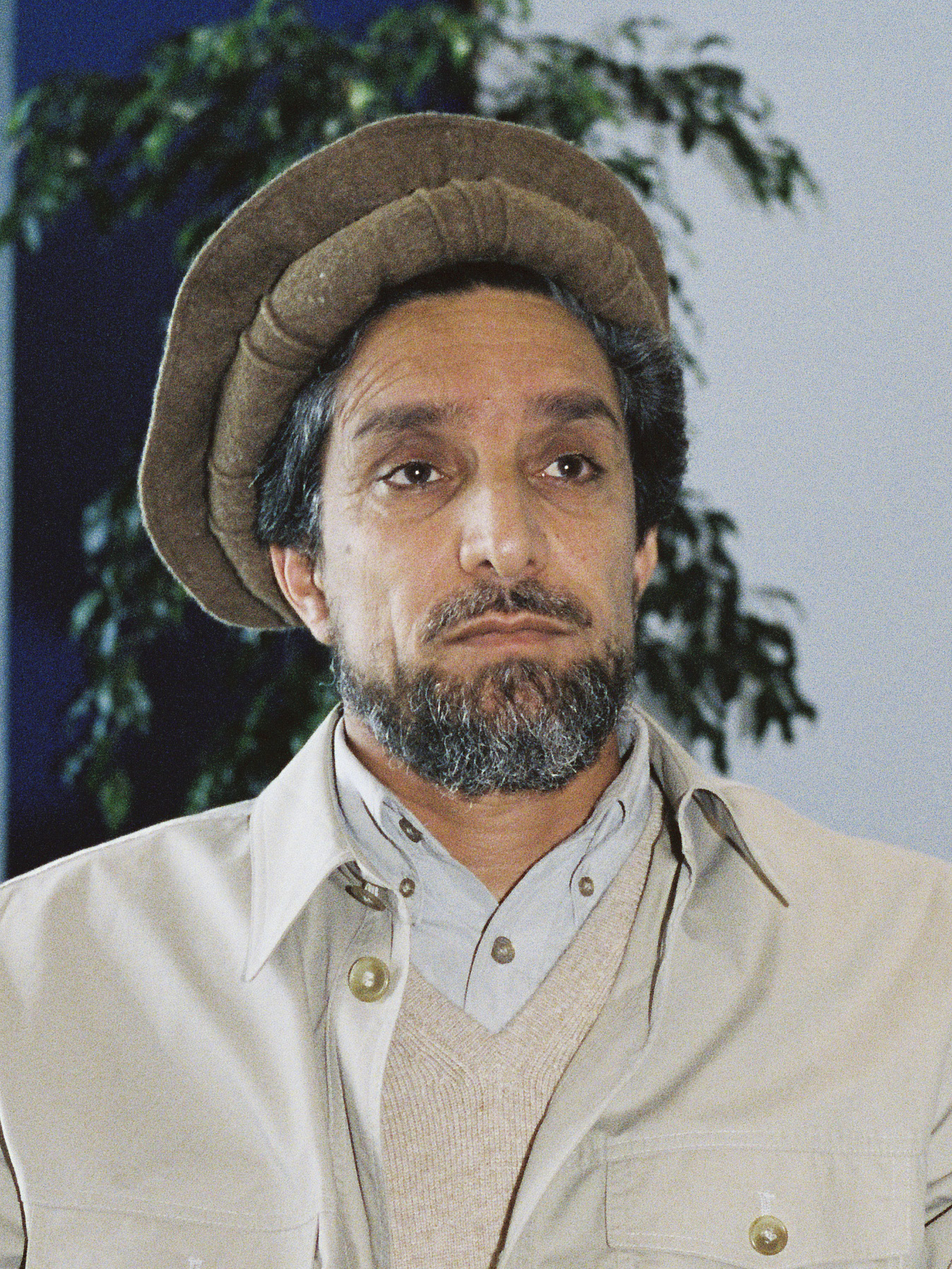
Ahmad Shah Massoud

Jamiat was a political party of ethnic Tajiks, and included one of the strongest mujahideen militias in Afghanistan since 1979. Its military wing was commanded by Ahmad Shah Massoud. As a powerful mujahideen leader during the Soviet–Afghan War, he successfully resisted the Soviets from taking Panjshir Valley. In 1992 he signed the Peshawar Accord, a peace and power-sharing agreement, in the post-communist Islamic State of Afghanistan, and was so appointed as the Minister of Defense as well as the government's main military commander. His militia fought to defend the capital Kabul against militias led by Hekmatyar and other warlords who were bombing the city—and eventually the Taliban, who started to lay siege to the capital in January 1995 after the city had seen fierce fighting with at least 60,000 civilians killed.

==== Hezb-e Islami Khalis ====
Hezb-e Islami Khalis was an Afghan political movement under Mohammad Yunus Khalis, who separated from Hezb-e Islami Gulbuddin and formed his own resistance group in 1979. After the fall of the Communist regime in 1992, Khalis participated in the Islamic Interim Government. He was a member of the Leadership Council (Shura-ye Qiyaadi), but held no other official post. Instead of moving to Kabul, he chose to remain in Nangarhar. His party controlled major parts of this politically and strategically important province. The Taliban brought Nangarhar under their control in September 1996 and Khalis was supportive of the Taliban movement and had a close relationship with its commanders.

==== Ittehad-e Islami / Saudi Arabia ====
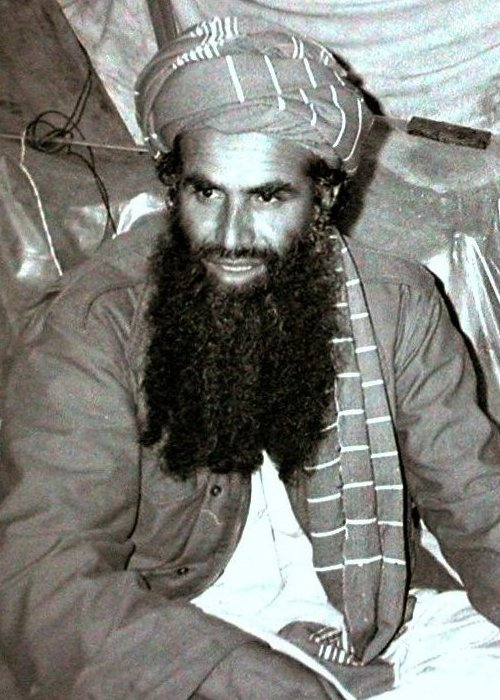
Abdulrab Rasul Sayyaf

The Sunni Pashtun organization Ittehad-e Islami, led by Abdulrab Rasul Sayyaf, was supported by Sunni Wahabbi Saudi Arabia, to maximize Wahhabi influence. After the forced withdrawal of the demoralised Soviet forces in 1989, and the overthrow of the Mohammad Najibullah regime in 1992, Ittehad-e-Islami's human rights record became noticeably worse, underlined by their involvement in the infamous massacres and rampages in the Hazara Kabul neighbourhood of Afshar in 1992–1993 during the Battle of Kabul. Sayyaf's faction was responsible for, "repeated human butchery", when his faction of Mujahideen turned on civilians and the Shia Hezb-i Wahdat group in west Kabul starting May 1992. Amnesty International reported that Sayyaf's forces rampaged through the mainly Shi'ite Qizilbash Afshar neighborhood of Kabul, slaughtering and raping inhabitants and burning homes. Sayyaf, who was allied with the de jure government of Rabbani, did not deny the abductions of Hazara civilians, but merely accused the Hezb-i Wahdat militia of being an agent of the theocratic Iranian government.

==== Harakat-i-Inqilab-i-Islami ====
Mohammad Nabi Mohammadi, leader of Harakat-i-Inqilab-i-Islami, became the Vice President of Afghanistan in the Islamic State of Afghanistan. However, when the mujahideen leaders opened their weapons at each other and the civil war in Afghanistan started, he resigned from his post and forbade the troops loyal to him from taking part in the war. He remained in Pakistan and tried his best to stop the war between Hekmatyar, Rabbani, and Sayyaf. In 1996, the Taliban took control of Afghanistan. Most of the Taliban leaders were the students of Molvi Mohammad Nabi Mohammadi. Mohammadi, however, maintained a good relationship with the Taliban.

=== Hezb-i Wahdat ===
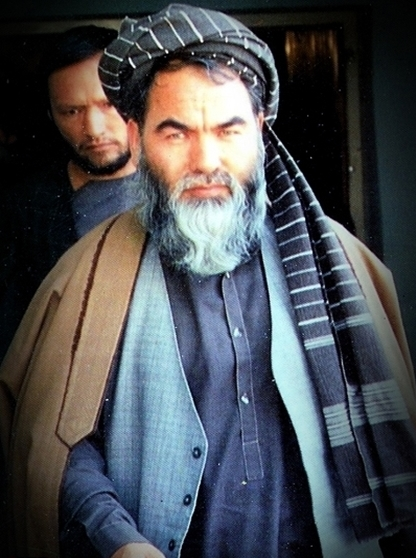
Abdul Ali Mazari

The Shia Hazara Hizb-e Wahdat-e Islami Afghanistan ('Islamic Unity Party of Afghanistan') of Abdul Ali Mazari was strongly supported by Shia Iran, according to Human Rights Watch, with Iran's Ministry of Intelligence and National Security officials providing direct orders.

Hezb-i Wahdat initially took part in the Islamic State of Afghanistan and held some posts in the government. Soon, however, conflict broke out between Hezb-i Wahdat and Ittehad-e Islami. The Islamic State's defense minister Ahmad Shah Massoud tried to mediate between the factions with some success, but the ceasefire remained only temporary. As of June 1992, the Hezb-i Wahdat and the Ittehad-e Islami engaged in violent street battles against each other. With the support of Saudi Arabia, Sayyaf's forces repeatedly attacked western suburbs of Kabul resulting in heavy civilian casualties. Likewise, Mazari's forces were also accused of attacking civilian targets in the west. Mazari acknowledged taking Pashtun civilians as prisoners, but defended the action by saying that Sayyaf's forces took Hazaras first. Mazari's group started cooperating with Hezb-e Islami Gulbuddin from January 1993.

=== Junbish-i Milli / Uzbekistan ===
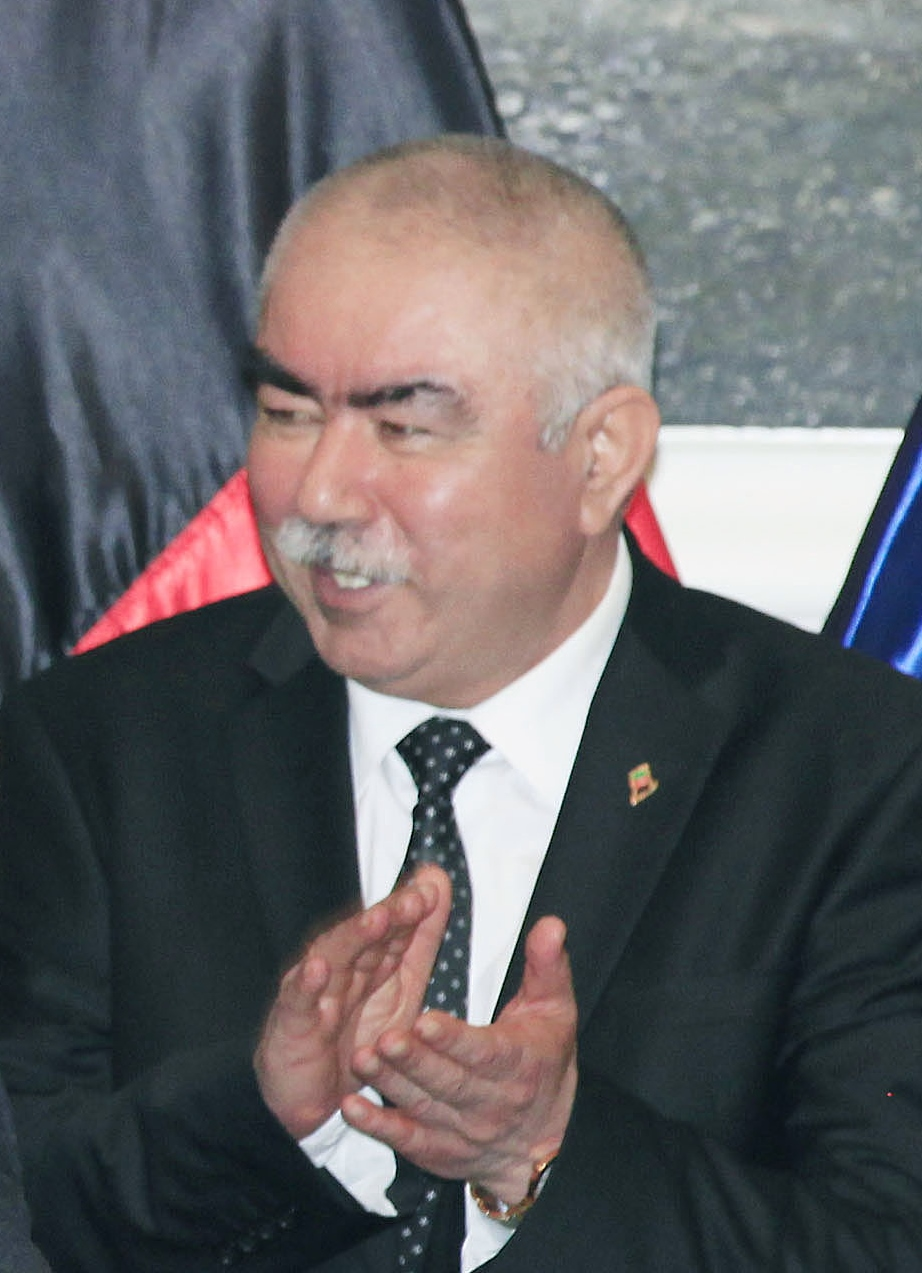
Abdul Rashid Dostum

The Junbish-i-Milli Islami Afghanistan ('National Islamic Movement of Afghanistan') militia of former communist and ethnic Uzbek general Abdul Rashid Dostum was backed by Uzbekistan. Uzbek President Islam Karimov was keen to see Dostum controlling as much of Afghanistan as possible, especially in the north along the Uzbek border. Dostum's men would become an important force in the fall of Kabul in 1992. In April 1992, the opposition forces began their march to Kabul against the government of Najibullah. Dostum had allied himself with the opposition commanders, Massoud and Sayed Jafar Naderi, the head of the Isma'ili community, and together they captured the capital city. He and Massoud fought in a coalition against Gulbuddin Hekmatyar. Massoud and Dostum's forces joined to defend Kabul against Hekmatyar. Some 4000-5000 of his troops, units of his Sheberghan-based 53rd Division and Balkh-based Guards Division, garrisoning Bala Hissar fort, Maranjan Hill, and Khwaja Rawash Airport, where they stopped Najibullah from entering to flee.

Dostum then left Kabul for his northern stronghold Mazar-i-Sharif, where he ruled, in effect, an independent region (or 'proto-state'), often referred as the Northern Autonomous Zone. He printed his own Afghan currency, ran a small airline named Balkh Air, and formed relations with countries including Uzbekistan. While the rest of the country was in chaos, his region remained prosperous and functional, and it won him the support from people of all ethnic groups. Many people fled to his territory to escape the violence and fundamentalism imposed by the Taliban later on. In 1994, Dostum allied himself with Gulbuddin Hekmatyar against the government of Rabbani and Massoud, but in 1995 sided with the government again.

=== Hezb-e Islami Gulbuddin / Pakistan's ISI ===
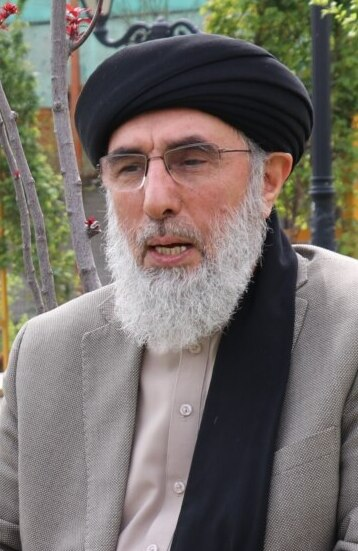
Gulbuddin Hekmatyar

According to the U.S. Special Envoy to Afghanistan in 1989–1992, Peter Tomsen, Gulbuddin Hekmatyar was hired in 1990 by the Pakistani intelligence agency Inter-Services Intelligence (ISI) planned to conquer and rule Afghanistan which was delayed until 1992 as a result of US pressure to cancel it. In April 1992, according to self-made Afghan historian Nojumi, the Inter-Services Intelligence helped Hekmatyar by sending hundreds of trucks loaded with weapons and fighters to the southern part of Kabul. In June 1992, Hezb-e Islami Gulbuddin started shelling Kabul. The Director of the Centre for Arab and Islamic Studies at the Australian National University, Amin Saikal, confirmed the Pakistani support in 1992 for Hekmatyar: "Pakistan was keen to gear up for a breakthrough in Central Asia...Islamabad could not possibly expect the new Islamic government leaders ... to subordinate their own nationalist objectives in order to help Pakistan realize its regional ambitions. ... Had it not been for the ISI's logistic support and supply of a large number of rockets, Hekmatyar's forces would not have been able to target and destroy half of Kabul."

=== Taliban / Pakistan ===
The Taliban have been described as a movement of religious students (talib) from the Pashtun areas of eastern and southern Afghanistan who had been educated in traditional Islamic schools in Pakistan. The movement was founded in September 1994, promising to "rid Afghanistan of warlords and criminals". Several analysts state that at least since October 1994, Pakistan and especially the Pakistani Inter-Services Intelligence were heavily supporting the Taliban. Amin Saikal stated: "Hekmatyar's failure to achieve what was expected of him [later] prompted the ISI leaders to come up with a new surrogate force [the Taliban]." Also a publication of the George Washington University stated: when Hekmatyar in 1994 had failed to "deliver for Pakistan", Pakistan turned towards a new force: the Taliban.

Massoud, involved in the political and military turmoil of Afghanistan since 1973 and therefore not an impartial observer, in early September 1996 described the Taliban as the centre of a wider movement in Afghanistan of armed Islamic radicalism: a coalition of wealthy sheikhs (like Osama bin Laden) and preachers from the Persian Gulf advocating the Saudi's puritanical outlook on Islam which Massoud considered abhorrent to Afghans but also bringing and distributing money and supplies; Pakistani and Arab intelligence agencies; impoverished young students from Pakistani religious schools chartered as volunteer fighters notably for this group called Taliban; and exiled Central Asian Islamic radicals trying to establish bases in Afghanistan for their revolutionary movements.

Although Pakistan initially denied supporting the Taliban, Pakistan's Interior Minister Naseerullah Babar (1993–96) would state in 1999, "we created the Taliban", and Pervez Musharraf, Pakistani president from 2001 to 2008, wrote in 2006: "we sided" with the Taliban to "spell the defeat" of anti-Taliban forces. According to journalist Ahmed Rashid, between 1994 and 1999, an estimated 80,000 to 100,000 Pakistanis trained and fought in Afghanistan on the side of the Taliban.

== War ==
=== 1992 ===
==== April–May ====
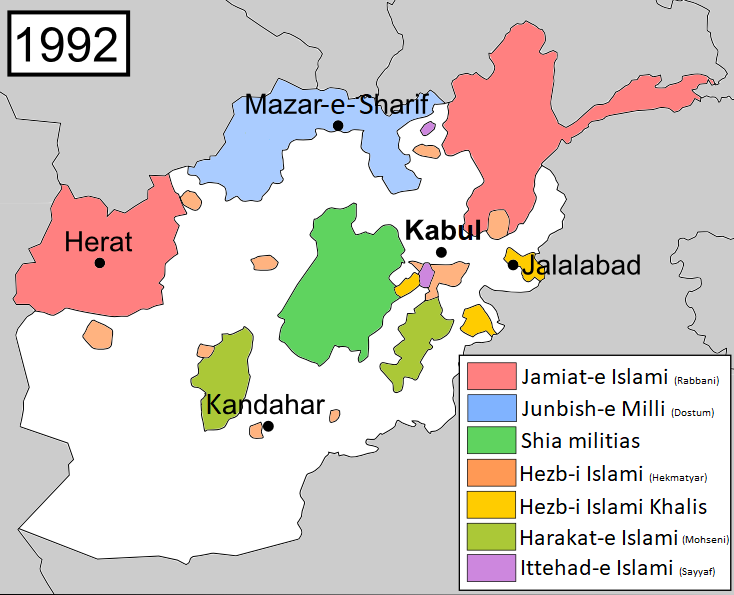
Territorial control in 1992

Suffering heavy casualties trying to take Kabul in April 1992, Hezb-e Islami Gulbuddin forces deserted their positions and fled to the outskirts of Kabul in the direction of Logar province. Though Hezb-e Islami Gulbuddin had been driven out of Kabul, but were still within artillery range. In May 1992 Hekmatyar started a bombardment campaign against the capital, firing thousands of rockets supplied by Pakistan. In addition to the bombardment campaign, Hekmatyar's forces had overrun Pul-e-Charkhi prison while still in the centre of Kabul, and had set free all the inmates, including many criminals, who were able to take arms and commit gruesome crimes against the population. With a government structure yet to be established, chaos broke out in Kabul.

Afghanistan's flag from 1992 to 1996

The immediate objective of the interim government was to defeat the forces acting against the Peshawar Accord. A renewed attempt at peace talks on 25 May 1992 again agreed to give Hekmatyar the position of prime minister, however, this lasted less than a week after Hekmatyar attempted to shoot down the plane of Mujaddidi. Furthermore, as part of the peace talks Hekmatyar was demanding the departure of Dostum's forces, which would have tilted the scales in his favour. This led to fighting between Dostum and Hekmatyar. On 30 May 1992, during fighting between the forces of Junbish-i Milli and Hezb-i Islami in the southeast of Kabul, both sides used artillery and rockets, killing and injuring an unknown number of civilians.

==== June–July ====
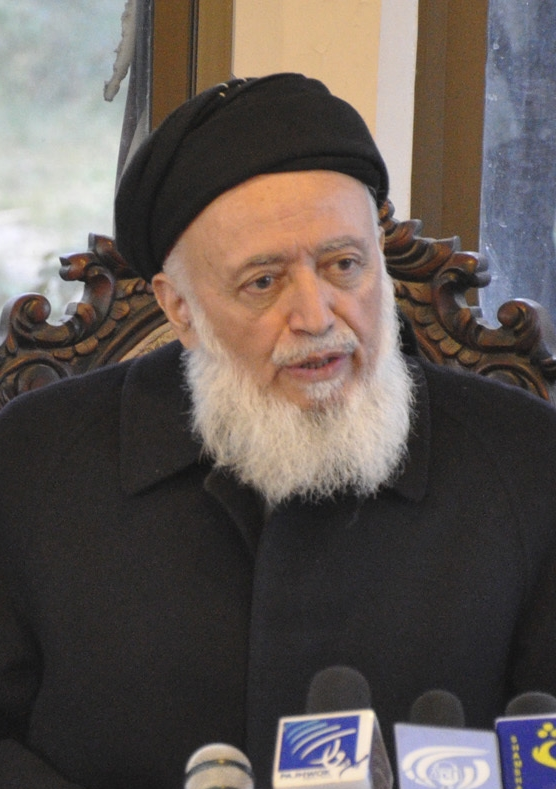
Burhanuddin Rabbani

In June 1992, as scheduled in the Peshawar Accords, Burhanuddin Rabbani became interim president of Afghanistan.

From the onset of the battle, Jamiat-e Islami and Shura-e Nazar controlled the strategic high areas, and were thus able to develop a vantage point within the city from which opposition forces could be targeted. Hekmatyar continued to bombard Kabul with rockets. Although Hekmatyar insisted that only Islamic Jihad Council areas were targeted, the rockets mostly fell over the houses of the innocent civilians of Kabul, a fact that has been well-documented. Artillery exchanges quickly broke out escalating in late May–Early June. Shura-e Nazar was able to immediately benefit from heavy weapons left by fleeing or defecting government forces and launched rockets on Hekmatyar's positions near the Jalalabad Custom's Post, and in the districts around Hood Khil, Qala-e Zaman Khan and near Pul-e-Charkhi prison. On 10 June it was reported that Dostum's forces had also begun nightly bombardments of Hezb-e Islami Gulbuddin positions.

Particularly noticeable in this period was the escalation of the fight in West Kabul between Hezb-i Wahdat, supported by Iran, and those of Ittehad-e Islami, supported by Saudi Arabia. Hezb-i Wahdat was somewhat nervous about the presence of Ittehad-e Islami posts, which were deployed in Hazara areas such as Rahman Baba High school. According to the writings of Nabi Azimi, who at the time was a high ranking governor, the fighting began on 31 May 1992 when 4 members of Hezb-i Wahdat's leadership were assassinated near the Kabul Silo. Those killed were Karimi, Sayyid Isma'il Hosseini, Chaman Ali Abuzar and Vaseegh, the first 3 being members of the party's central committee. Following this the car of Haji Shir Alam, a top Ittehad-e Islami commander was stopped near Pol-e Sorkh, and although Alem escaped, one of the passengers was killed. On 3 June 1992, heavy fighting between forces of Ittehad-e Islami and Hezb-i Wahdat in west Kabul. Both sides used rockets, killing and injuring civilians. On 4 June, interviews with Hazara households state that Ittehad-e Islami forces looted their houses in Kohte-e Sangi, killing 6 civilians. The gun battles at this time had a death toll of over 100 according to some sources. On 5 June 1992, further conflict between forces of Ittehad-e Islami and Hezb-i Wahdat in west Kabul was reported. Here, both sides used heavy artillery, destroying houses and other civilian structures. Three schools were reported destroyed by bombardment. The bombardment killed and injured an unknown number of civilians. Gunmen were reported killing people in shops near the Kabul Zoo. On 24 June 1992 the Jamhuriat hospital located near the Interior Ministry was bombed and closed. Jamiat-e Islami and Shura-e Nazar sometimes joined the conflict when their positions came under attack by Hezb-i Wahdat forces and in June/July bombarded Hezb-i Wahdat positions in return. Harakat forces also sometimes joined the fight.

==== August–December ====
In the month of August alone, a bombardment of artillery shells, rockets and fragmentation bombs killed over 2,000 people in Kabul, most of them civilians. On 1 August the airport was attacked by rockets. 150 rockets alone were launched the following day, and according to one author these missile attacks killed as many as 50 people and injured 150. In the early morning on 10 August Hezb-e Islami Gulbuddin forces attacked from three directions – Chelastoon, Darulaman and Maranjan mountain. A shell also struck a Red Cross hospital. On 10–11 April nearly a thousand rockets hit parts of Kabul including about 250 hits on the airport. Some estimate that as many as 1000 were killed, with the attacks attributed to Hekmatyar's forces. By 20 August it was reported that 500, 000 people had fled Kabul. On 13 August 1992, a rocket attack was launched on Deh Afghanan in which cluster bombs were used. 80 were killed and more than 150 injured according to press reports. In response to this, Shura-e Nazar forces bombard Kart-I Naw, Shah Shaheed and Chiilsatoon with aerial and ground bombardment. In this counterattack more than 100 were killed and 120 wounded.

Hezb-e Islami Gulbuddin was not however the only perpetrator of indiscriminate shelling of civilians. Particularly in West Kabul, Hezb-i Wahdat, Ittehad-e Islami and Jamiat-e Islami all have been accused of deliberately targeting civilian areas. All sides used non-precision rockets such as Sakre rockets and the UB-16 and UB-32 S-5 airborne rocket launchers.

In November, in a very effective move, Hekmatyar's forces, together with guerrillas from some of the Arab groups, barricaded a power station in Sarobi, 30 miles east of Kabul, cutting electricity to the capital and shutting down the water supply, which is dependent on power. His forces and other Mujahideen were also reported to have prevented food convoys from reaching the city.

On 23 November, Minister of Food Sulaiman Yaarin reported that the city's food and fuel depots were empty. The government was now under heavy pressure. At the end of 1992 Hezb-i Wahdat officially withdrew from the government and opened secret negotiations with Hezb-i Islami. In December 1992, Rabbani postponed convening a shura to elect the next president. On 29 December 1992, Rabbani was elected as president and he agreed to establish a parliament with representatives from all of Afghanistan. Also notable during this month was the solidification of an alliance between Hezb-i Wahdat and Hezb-e Islami Gulbuddin against the Islamic State of Afghanistan. While Hizb-i Islami joined in bombardments to support Hezb-i Wahdat, Wahdat conducted joint offensives, such as the one to secure Darulaman. On 30 December 1992 at least one child was apparently killed in Pul-i Artan by a BM21 Rocket launched from Hezb-e Islami Gulbuddin forces at Rishkor.

==== Kandahar ====
Kandahar was host to three different local Pashtun commanders Amir Lalai, Gul Agha Sherzai and Mullah Naqib Ullah who engaged in an extremely violent struggle for power and who were not affiliated with the interim government in Kabul. The bullet-riddled city came to be a centre of lawlessness, crime and atrocities fueled by complex Pashtun tribal rivalries.

=== 1993 ===
==== January–February ====
The authority of Rabbani remained limited to only part of Kabul; the rest of the city remained divided among rival militia factions. On 19 January, a short-lived cease-fire broke down when Hezb-e Islami Gulbuddin renewed rocket attacks on Kabul from their base in the south of the city supervised by Commander Toran Kahlil. Jamiat fought back. Hundreds were killed and wounded while many houses were destroyed.

Heavy fighting was reported around a Hezb-i Wahdat post held by Commander Sayid Ali Jan near Rabia Balkhi girls' school. Most notable during this period was the rocket bombardments that would start against the residential area of Afshar. Some of these areas, such as Wahdat's headquarters at the Social Science Institute, were considered military targets, a disproportionate number of the rockets, tank shells and mortars fell in civilian areas. Numerous rockets were reportedly launched from Haider-controlled frontlines of Tap-I Salaam towards the men of Division 095 under Ali Akbar Qasemi. One attack during this time from Hezb-i Wahdat killed at least 9 civilians. Further rockets bombardments took place on 26 February 1993 as Shura-e Nazar and Hezb-e Islami Gulbuddin bombarded each other's positions. Civilians were the main victims in the fighting, which killed some 1,000 before yet another peace accord was signed on 8 March. However the following day rocketing by Hezb-e Islami Gulbuddin and Hezb-i Wahdat in Kabul left another 10 dead.

===== Afshar =====
The Afshar Operation was a military operation by Rabbani's Islamic State of Afghanistan government forces against Hezb-e Islami Gulbuddin and Hezb-i Wahdat forces that took place in February 1993. Hezb-i Wahdat, together with Hezb-e Islami Gulbuddin, were shelling densely populated areas in Kabul from their positions in Afshar. To counter these attack Islamic State forces attacked Afshar in order to capture the positions of Wahdat, capture Wahdat's leader Abdul Ali Mazari and to consolidate parts of the city controlled by the government. The operation took place in a densely populated district of Kabul, the Afshar district. Afshar district is situated on the slopes of Mount Afshar in west Kabul. The district is predominantly home to the Hazara ethnic group. Ittehad-e Islami troops escalated the operation into a rampage against civilians. Both Ittehad and Wahdat forces have severely targeted civilians in their war. The Wahhabist Ittehad-e Islami supported by Saudi Arabia was targeting Shias, while the Iran-controlled Hezb-i Wahdat was targeting Sunni Muslims.

==== March–December ====
Rabbani and Hekmatyar after signing a power-sharing deal on 7 March 1993

Under the March accord, brokered by Pakistan and Saudi Arabia, Rabbani, and Hekmatyar agreed to share power until elections could be held in late 1994. Hekmatyar's condition had been the resignation of Massoud as minister of defense. The parties agreed to a new peace accord in Jalalabad on 20 May under which Massoud agreed to relinquish the post of Defense Minister. Massoud had resigned in order to gain peace. Hekmatyar at first accepted the post of prime minister but after attending only one cabinet meeting he left Kabul again starting to bomb Kabul leaving more than 700 dead in bombing raids, street battles and rocket attacks in and around Kabul. Massoud returned to the position of minister of defense to defend the city against the rocket attacks.

=== 1994 ===
==== January–June ====
In January 1994, Dostum, for various reasons, joined with Hezb-e Islami Gulbuddin, Hezb-i Wahdat, and Junbish-i Milli then launched the Shura Hamaghangi campaign against Massoud's forces, and the interim government. During this, Hezb-e Islami Gulbuddin was able make use of Junbish's air force in both bombing the positions of Jamiat-e Islami and in resupplying their men. This led to greater artillery bombardment on behalf of Hezb-e Islami Gulbuddin. Hezb-e Islami Gulbuddin and Junbish-i Milli were able to hold parts of central Kabul during this time. Junbish forces were particularly singled out for committing looting, rape and murder, for the sole reason that they could get away with it. Some commanders such as Shir Arab, commander of the 51st regiment, Kasim Jangal Bagh, Ismail Diwaneh ["Ismail the Mad"], and Abdul Cherikwere particularly singled out. According to Afghanistan Justice Project, during this period until June 1994, 25,000 people were killed. Areas around Microraion were particularly bloody. By now the population of Kabul had dropped from 2,000,000 during Soviet times to 500,000 due to a large exodus from Kabul.

==== July–December ====
Numerous Iranian agents were assisting Hezb-i Wahdat, as "Iran was attempting to maximize Wahdat's military power and influence in the new government". Saudi agents "were trying to strengthen the Wahhabi Abdul Rasul Sayyaf and his Ittehad-e Islami faction to the same end". "Outside forces saw instability in Afghanistan as an opportunity to press their own security and political agendas." Human Rights Watch writes that "rare ceasefires, usually negotiated by representatives of Ahmad Shah Massoud, Sibghatullah Mojaddedi, or Burhanuddin Rabbani (the interim government), or officials from the International Committee of the Red Cross (ICRC), commonly collapsed within days."

In late 1994, as per academic consensus, Pakistani agencies created the Taliban organization. Pakistan saw in the Taliban a way to secure trade routes to Central Asia and establish an obedient government in Kabul friendly to its interests. Pakistani politicians during that time repeatedly denied creating and supporting the Taliban. But senior Pakistani officials such as Interior Minister Naseerullah Babar would later state, "we created the Taliban" and former Pakistani President Musharraf would write "we sided" with the Taliban to "spell the defeat" of anti-Taliban forces. The Taliban emerged with the stated goal of liberating Afghanistan from its present corrupt leadership of warlords and establish a pure Islamic society. It was reported in 2009 that the Taliban originated in the districts around Kandahar city.

In October 1994 a bomb struck a wedding ceremony in Qala Fathullah in Kabul, killing 70 civilians. No fighting had been witnessed in the area in several days according to reports.

Also in October 1994, the Taliban revolted in Kandahar. On 12 October 1994, the Taliban scored their first victory when they captured the Kandahar district of Spin Boldak. They then captured Kandahar city on 5 November 1994 and soon went on to capture most of the south.

By the end of 1994, Junbish-i Milli and Dostum were on the defensive in Kabul, and Massoud's forces had ousted them from most of their strongholds. Massoud more and more gained control of Kabul. At the same time Junbish was able to push Jamiat-e Islami out of Mazar-e Sharif.

=== 1995 ===
==== January–March ====
Rabbani refused to step down at the end of his term on 28 December 1994, and on 1 January UN peace envoy Mahmoud Mistiri returned to Kabul. On 10 January Rabbani offered to step down and turn over power to a 23-member UN interim administration if Hekmatyar agreed to withdraw. On 12 January a cease fire was agreed, but bombing began again on 19 January, killing at least 22. Between 22 and 31 January, Junbish-i Milli bombed government positions in Kunduz town and province, killing 100 people are and wounding over 120. The town fell to Dostum on 5 February. Rabbani further delayed his resignation on the 21st, stating he would resign on the 22nd. In late January, Ghazni fell to the Taliban. Hekmatyar lost hundreds of men and several tanks in the battle, which included a temporary alliance between the Taliban and the forces of Rabbani.

Meanwhile, the Taliban began to approach Kabul, capturing Wardak in early February and Maidan Shar, the provincial capital, on 10 February 1995. On 14 February 1995, Hekmatyar was forced to abandon his artillery positions at Charasiab due to the advance of the Taliban, who were, therefore, able to take control of this weaponry. During 25–27 February clashes broke out in Karte Seh, Kote Sangi and Karte Chahar between government forces and Hezb-i Wahdat, resulting in 10 dead and 12 wounded. In March, Massoud launched an offensive against Hezb-i Wahdat trapping Wahdat forces in Karte Seh and Kote Sangi. According to other reports, the forces of Jamiat-e Islami also committed mass rape and executions on civilians in this period. The Taliban retreated under the bombardment, taking Mazari with them and throwing him from a helicopter en route to Kandahar. The Taliban then continued to launch offenses against Kabul, using the equipment of Hezb-i Islami. While the Taliban retreated, large amounts of looting and pillaging was said to have taken place in south-western Kabul by the forces under Rabbani and Massoud against ethnic Hazaras. Estimates of civilian casualties from this period of fighting are 100 killed and 1000 wounded.

Starting on 12 March 1995 Massoud's forces launched an offensive against the Taliban and were able to drive them out from the area around Kabul, retaking Charasiab on 19 March and leading to a period of relative calm for a few months. The battle left hundreds of Taliban dead and the force suffered its first defeat. However, while retreating, the Taliban shelled the capital, Kabul. On 16 March, Rabbani stated, once again, that he would not resign. On 30 March, a grave of 22 male corpses, 20 of which were shot in the head, was found in Charasiab.

==== April–September ====
On 4 April, the Taliban killed about 800 government soldiers and captured 300 more in Farah Province, but were later forced to retreat. In early May, Rabbani's forces attacked the Taliban in Maidan Shar. India and Pakistan agree to reopen their diplomatic missions in Kabul on 3–4 May. On 11 May, Ismail Khan and Rabbani's forces recaptured Farah from the Taliban. Ismail Khan reportedly used cluster bombs, killing 220–250 unarmed civilians. Between 14 and 16 May, Helmand and Nimruz fall to Rabbani and Khan's forces. On 20 May, Hezb-i Wahdat forces captured Bamiyan. On 5 June, Dostum's forces attacked Rabbani's forces in Samangan. More than 20 are killed, and both forces continue to fight in Baghlan. On 9 June, a 10-day truce was signed between the government and the Taliban. On 15 June, Dostum bombed Kabul and Kunduz. Two 550-pound (250 kg) bombs are dropped in a residential area of Kabul, killing two and injuring one. Three land near the defence ministry. On 20 June, the government recaptured Bamiyan. On 23 July, Dostum and Wahdat managed to recapture Bamiyan. On 3 August, the Taliban hijacked a Russian cargo aircraft in Kandahar and captured weapons intended for Rabbani. The Government captured Girishk and Helmand from the Taliban on 28 August, but were unable to hold Girishk. In September, Dostum forces captured Badghis. The Taliban were able to capture Farah on 2 September, and Shindand on the 3rd. On 5 September, Herat fell, with Ismail Khan fleeing to Mashhad. Some attribute this to the informal alliance between Dostum and the Taliban, along with Dostum's bombing of the city. Iran followed by closing the border. On 6 September, a mob swarms the Pakistani embassy in Kabul, killing one and wounding 26, including the Pakistani ambassador.

==== October–December ====
On 11 October, the Taliban retook Charasiab. The National Reconciliation Commission presented its proposals for peace on the same day. On 15 October, Bamiyan fell to the Taliban. Between 11 and 13 November 1995 at least 57 unarmed civilians were killed and over 150 injured when rockets and artillery barrages fired from Taliban positions south of Kabul pounded the civilian areas of the city. On 11 November alone, 36 civilians were killed when over 170 rockets as well as shells hit civilians areas. A salvo crashed into Foruzga Market, while another struck the Taimani district, where many people from other parts of Kabul have settled. Other residential areas hit by artillery and rocket attacks were the Bagh Bala district in the northwest of Kabul and Wazir Akbar Khan, where much of the city's small foreign community lived. In the north, Rabbani's forces fought for control of the Balkh Province, reclaiming many districts from Dostum.

On 20 November 1995, Taliban forces gave the government a 5-day ultimatum in which they would resume bombardment if Rabbani and his forces did not leave the city. This ultimatum was eventually withdrawn. By the end of December, more than 150 people had died in Kabul due to the repeated rocketing, shelling, and high-altitude bombing of the city, reportedly by Taliban forces.

=== 1996 ===
==== January–September ====
On 2–3 January, Taliban rocket attacks killed between 20 and 24 people and wounded another 43–56. On 10 January, a peace proposal was presented to the Taliban and opposition. On 14 January, Hekmatyar blocked Kabul's western route, leaving the city surrounded. However, in mid-January, Iran intervened and the Khalili faction of Hezb-i Wahdat signed a peace agreement that lead to the opening of the Kabul-Bamiyan road. On 20 January, factional fighting broke out among the Taliban in Kandahar. On 1 February, Taliban jet-bombed a residential area in Kabul, killing 10 civilians. On 3 February, the Red Cross began to airlift supplies into Kabul. On 6 February, the road is used to bring in more food. On 26 February, Hikmatyar and the pro-Dostum Ismaili faction of Sayed Jafar Nadiri fought in Pul-i Khumri, Baghlan Province. Hundreds were killed before a ceasefire was reached on 4 March and the Ismaili faction lost 11 important positions.

In 1996, the Taliban returned to seize Kabul. Analyst Ahmed Rashid considers the Taliban at that time to have been decisively supported by Pakistan; also less renowned sources suspect Taliban to have had support from Pakistan, considering their heavy weaponry.

On 7 March, Hikmatyar and the Rabbani government signed an agreement to take military action against the Taliban.

On 11 April, the government captured Saghar District in Ghor Province from the Taliban, along with large stores of ammunition. Fighting continues, however, in Chaghcharan, and the Taliban captured Shahrak district. On 4 May, the Iranian embassy in Kabul was shelled and two staff members were wounded. On 12 May, Hikmatyar's forces arrived in Kabul to help defend against the Taliban. On 24 May, another peace agreement was signed between Rabbani and Hikmatyar. On 24 June, Rasul Pahlawan, an Uzbek military leader in Afghanistan, was killed in an ambush near Mazar-i Sharif. This would later have significant impact on the balance of power in the North.

On 3 July, a 10-member cabinet is formed. Hikmatyar's party got the ministries of defense and finance; Rabbani got the ministries of interior and foreign affairs; Sayyaf's party got education, information and culture, while Harakat-i-Islami got planning and labor and social welfare and the Hezb-i Wahdat Akbari faction got commerce. 12 other seats were left open for other factions.

On 8 August government forces captured Chaghcharan, but lost it again. On 11 September, Jalalabad fell to the Taliban, who then marched on Sarobi. On 12 September, the Taliban captured Mihtarlam in Laghman province. On 22 September, Kunar province fell to the Taliban.

==== Taliban take-over ====
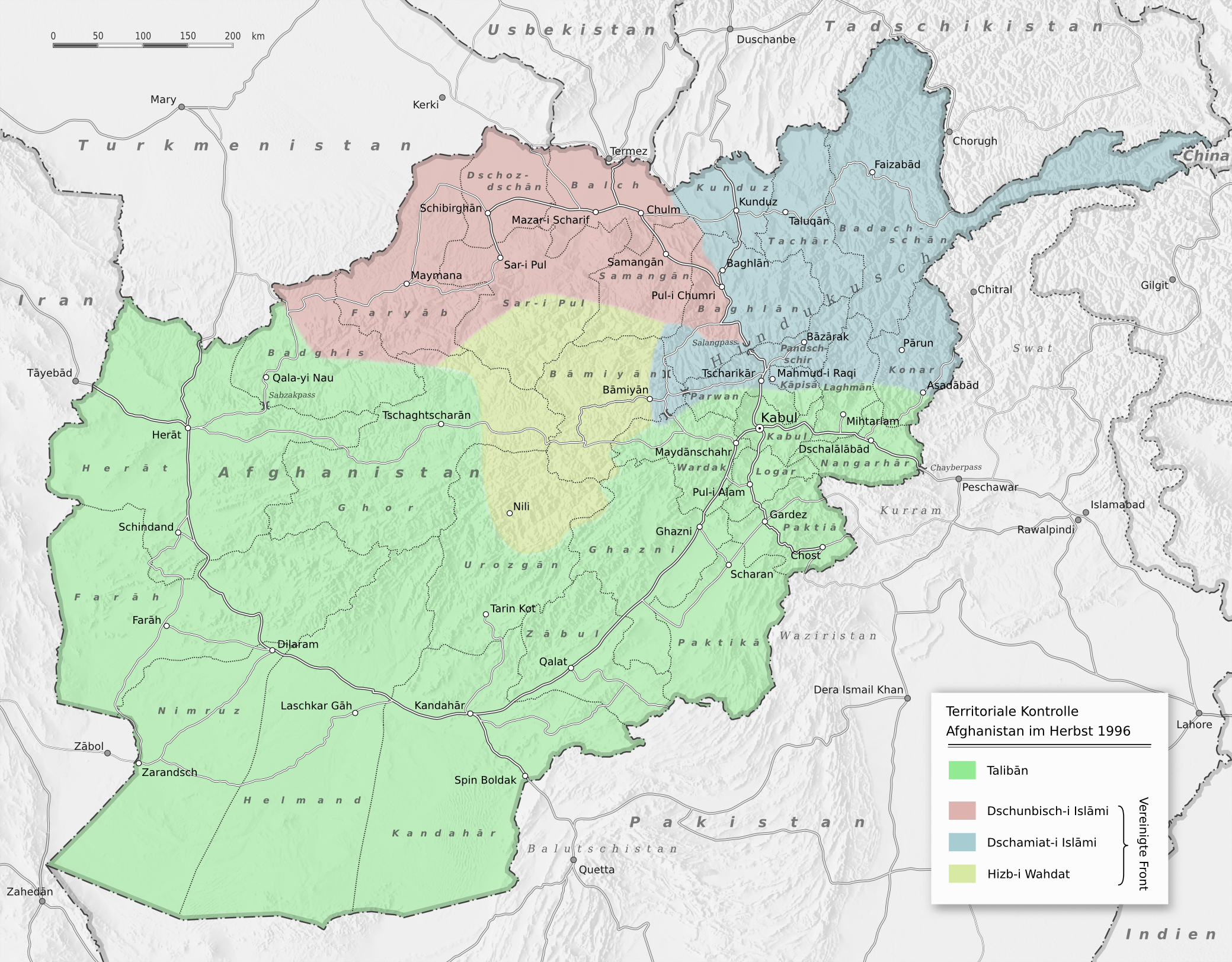
Territorial control in Afghanistan in the fall of 1996, following the capture of Kabul by the Taliban.

On 25 September, the strategic town of Sarobi, an eastern outpost of Kabul, fell to the Taliban who captured it from interim government troops. 50 people were killed and the Taliban captured many arms from fleeing government soldiers.

On 26 September, with the Taliban attacking Kabul, interim minister of defense Massoud in his headquarters in northern Kabul concluded that his and Rabbani's interim government's forces had been encircled, and decided to quickly evacuate or withdraw those forces to the north, to avoid destruction. Hekmatyar also withdrew from Kabul.

By nightfall, or on the next day of 27 September, the Taliban had conquered Kabul. The Taliban's leader Mullah Muhammad Omar appointed his deputy, Mullah Mohammad Rabbani, as head of a national ruling council which was called the Islamic Emirate of Afghanistan. By now, the Taliban controlled most of Afghanistan.

== Aftermath ==
In its first action while in power, the Taliban hanged Najibullah and his brother from a tower, after they had first castrated Najibullah and then tortured them to death. All key government installations appeared to be in Taliban's hands within hours, including the presidential palace and the ministries of defense, security and foreign affairs.

On 5 October 1996, the Taliban attacked Massoud's forces in the Salang Pass but suffered heavy losses. On 1 October, Massoud retook Jabal Saraj and Charikar. Bagram was taken back a week later. On 15–19 October, Qarabagh changed hands before being captured by Massoud and Dostum's forces. During 21–30 October, Massoud's forces stalled on the way to the capital. On 25 October, the Taliban claimed to have captured Badghis province and started to attack Dostum's forces in Faryab. On 27–28 October, anti-Taliban forces attempted to recapture Kabul but were unable to do so. On 30 October Dara-I-Nur District in Nangarhar province fell to anti-Taliban forces but was retaken in early November. Fighting also occurred in Baghdis province with no significant gains from either side. Ismail Khan's forces were flown in from Iran to support the anti-Taliban alliance. On 4 November, Dostum's forces bombed the Herat airport and anti-Taliban forces took control of Nurgal district in Konar province. Between 9 and 12 November, Dostum's jets bombed the Kabul airport, and between 11 and 16 approximately 50,000 people, mostly Pashtuns, arrived in Herat province, fleeing the fight in Badghis.

Afghanistan's flag from 1997 to 2001; the flag from 1996 to 1997 was completely white

On 20 November 1996, the UNHCR halted all activities in Kabul. On 21–22 December, anti-Taliban demonstrations occurred in Herat as women demanded assistance from international organizations, but it was violently dispersed. On 28–29 December a major offensive was launched against Bagram airbase and the base was surrounded.

The Northern Alliance was created in opposition to the Taliban under the leadership of Massoud. In the following years, over 1 million people fled the Taliban, many arriving to the areas controlled by Massoud. The events of this war lead to the Afghan Civil War (1996–2001).

== Spillover into Pakistan ==
During the war, many foreign Jihadists and refugees poured into Pakistan to join and fight for TNSM (Tehreek-e-Nafaz-e-Shariat-e-Mohammadi) in order to enforce Sharia law in Pakistan's Malakand Division.

== Atrocities ==
In 1992–1993 Kabul, Hezb-i Wahdat, Ittehad-e Islami, Jamiat-e Islami, and Hezb-e Islami Gulbuddin would regularly target civilians with attacks, intentionally fire rockets into occupied civilian homes, or random civilian areas. In 1993–95, members of Jamiat, Junbish, Hezb-i Wahdat, and Hezb-e Islami Gulbuddin committed murder, rape, and extortion. In January–June 1994, 25,000 people died in Kabul due to fighting, with targeted attacks on civilian areas, between an alliance of Junbish-i Milli with Hezb-e Islami Gulbuddin against Jamiat-e Islami.

The Human Rights Watch, in two report, stated that nearly all armies participating in the war contributed to "destroying at least one-third of Kabul, killing thousands of civilians, driving a half million refugees to Pakistan": Jamiat-e Islami, Junbish-i Milli, Hezb-i Wahdat, Hezb-e Islami Gulbuddin, and Ittehad-e Islami.

== Bibliography ==
- Rashid, A. (2000). Taliban: Islam, oil, and the new great game in Central Asia. I.B. Tauris.
- Rubin, B. R. (2002). The fragmentation of Afghanistan: State formation and collapse in the international system. Yale University Press.
- Marsden, P. (1998). The Taliban: war, religion and the new order in Afghanistan. Zed Books.
- Casting Shadows: War Crimes and Crimes against Humanity: 1978-2001 (PDF) (Report). Afghanistan Justice Project. 2005.
- Coll, Steve (2004). Ghost Wars: The Secret History of the CIA, Afghanistan, and Bin Laden, from the Soviet Invasion to September 10, 2001. Penguin Group, London, New York etc. ISBN 0-141-02080-6.
- Corwin, Phillip (2003). Doomed in Afghanistan: A UN Officer's Memoir of the Fall of Kabul and Najibullah's Failed Escape, 1992. Rutgers University Press. p. 70. ISBN 978-0-8135-3171-7.
- Gutman, Roy (2008). How We Missed the Story: Osama Bin Laden, the Taliban, and the Hijacking of Afghanistan. US Institute of Peace Press. ISBN 978-1-60127-024-5.
- Nojumi, Neamatollah (2002). The Rise of the Taliban in Afghanistan: Mass Mobilization, Civil War, and the Future of the Region. New York: Palgrave Macmillan. ISBN 978-0-312-29584-4.
- Saikal, Amin (2004). Modern Afghanistan: A History of Struggle and Survival. I.B.Tauris. ISBN 978-0-85771-478-7.
