= Zulmai Tufan =

- Born: Afghanistan
- Military career
- Allegiance: Ittihad-i Islami
- Branch: Afghan National Army
- Rank: Commander
- Unit: Lewa 597 Brigade
- Conflicts: Afshar Operation

Zulmai Tufan was a major aligned with Ittihad-i Islami and Abdul Rasul Sayyaf and a major power in the area around Kabul, Afghanistan.

In the lead up to the Afshar Operation Tufan, along with Shir Alam was reported to have been present as representatives of Abdul Sayyaf, at the major meeting with Ahmad Shah Massoud two days prior to the operation, as well as the meeting with Sayyaf the following day, in which the operation was planned.

He has been accused of abuses, including killing prisoners using tank chains.
