= Sher Alam Ibrahimi =

Former governor of Ghazni Province

Sher Alam Ibrahimi (Shir Alem, Shir Alam, Sher Alem)

Governor of Ghazni
- In office 29 June 2005 – 19 September 2006
- Preceded by: Asadullah Khalid
- Succeeded by: Mirajuddin Patan

Personal details
- Born: 1955 (age 70–71) Kingdom of Afghanistan

Military service
- Allegiance: Ittihad-i Islami
- Branch/service: Afghan National Army
- Commands: 10th Division Commander
- Battles/wars: Afshar Operation

Hajii Sher Alam Ibrahimi was the governor of Ghazni Province from around 2005–2006 until 2007 and is a major commander aligned with Ittihad-i Islami and Abdul Rasul Sayyaf, having fought with him in the Afghan Civil War.

During the fighting in Kabul in 1992, it was reported that Alem was captured by Hezb-e Wahdat forces. Although he was released, his bodyguard was shot, leading to retaliatory fighting. In the lead-up to the Afshar Operation, Alem was reported to have been present at both the major meeting with Ahmad Shah Massoud as well as the meeting with Sayyaf the following day, in which the operation was planned. At that time some of his subcommanders included Commander Naqibuddin in Qala-i Qazi and Commander Hafiz in Shakar Dara.

In November 2001, Shir led a failed Northern Alliance attack against a Taliban stronghold in Maidan Shar, Wardak Province. After the fall of the Taliban, he became the commander of the First army Corps until early 2005.

Currently, Shir has been listed as one of the most powerful commanders in Paghman district in Kabul province, where he has control over all the checkpoints. In mid-2005 he was a parliamentary candidate.

In 2005, Alam turned over hundreds of mt of arms to the government including RPGs and other weapons.

On June 29, 2005, Alam was appointed as the Governor of Ghazni province. As with many politicians with roots in the country's violent past, Alam is a source of controversy. His campaigners were accused of threats and intimidation during the 2005 Afghan election and in 2006 he was one of a number of Sayyaf's allies to be accused of appropriating land near Kabul.

In September 2006, hundreds of residents of Paghman District in Kabul Province accused him and his commanders of stealing land and protested for the government to intervene. The protesters were joined by some commanders, including Commander Abdul Ghafar. Alam denied the charges. Alam has also been associated with Tanzim-e-Dawat-e-Islami. In 2006, he survived a Taliban attack on his life.

Preceded by Asadullah Khalid	Governor of Ghazni Province, Afghanistan; 2005–?	Succeeded by Marajuddin Patan
