= Asadullah Khalid =

Politician in Afghanistan

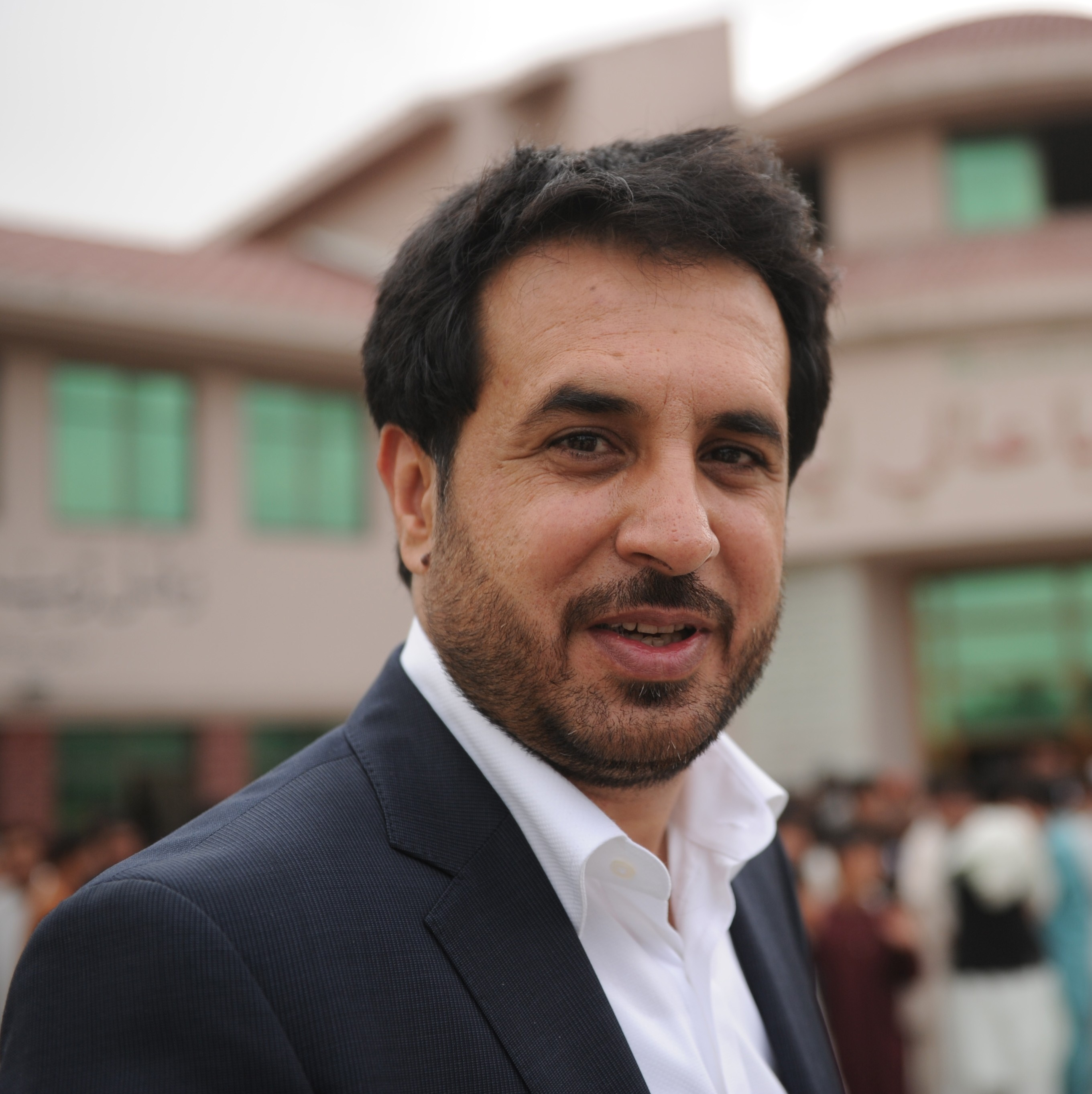
- Asadullah Khalid in front of the Rahman Baba High School in Kabul

Minister of Defense
- In office 23 December 2018 – 19 March 2021; Acting: 23 December 2018 – 21 November 2020
- President: Ashraf Ghani
- Preceded by: Tariq Shah Bahrami
- Succeeded by: Yasin Zia (Acting)

Director of the National Directorate of Security
- In office 15 September 2012 – 28 January 2015
- Preceded by: Rahmatullah Nabil
- Succeeded by: Rahmatullah Nabil

Minister of Tribal and Border Affairs
- In office 2008 – 15 September 2012
- President: Hamid Karzai
- Preceded by: Abdul Karim Brahui
- Succeeded by: Mohammad Arif Noorzai

Governor of Kandahar Province
- In office 2005–2008
- Preceded by: Yousef Pashtun
- Succeeded by: Rahmatullah Raufi

Governor of Ghazni Province
- In office 2002–2005
- Preceded by: Taj Mohammad Qari Baba
- Succeeded by: Sher Alam Ibrahimi

Personal details
- Born: 10 June 1970 (age 56) Ghazni, Kingdom of Afghanistan
- Party: ISO

Asadullah Khalid is a former politician in Afghanistan. He served as head of the National Directorate of Security (NDS), the domestic intelligence agency of Afghanistan. Before his appointment as the head of the NDS in September 2012, Khalid served as the Minister of Tribal and Border Affairs. Between 2005 and 2008, he was the Governor of Kandahar Province and prior to that as Governor of Ghazni Province (2002-2005). From 2018 until 2021 he was the Minister of Defense. Khalid is said to be affiliated with the Islamic Dawah Organisation of Afghanistan (Ittihad-i Islami) and has been noted as one of many loyalists of Afghan President Hamid Karzai.

== Biography ==
Haji Asadullah Khalid was born in the Ghazni Province of Afghanistan on 10 June 1970 into a Taraki Ghilzai Pashtun family. His father served as an MP during the reign of the king Zaher Shah while in later days his uncle became a known Ittihad-i Islami commander. Asadullah Khalid himself became affiliated with the Ittihad party and its leader Abdul Rab Rasul Sayyaf.

During the rule of the Taliban (1996-2001), Khalid served with the anti-Taliban resistance as part of the Ittihad faction. The Afghanistan Analyst Network writes that Khalid may have recovered "Stinger missiles on behalf of Ittihad’s boss, Sayyaf", which may have brought him into first direct contacts with the CIA. Khalid's personal account of that time is that he studied law in Tajikistan.

After the fall of the Taliban regime, Khalid worked with the National Directorate of Security, Department 5, but shortly afterwards became Governor of his home Ghazni province, a post he held until 2005. After a re-shuffle in 2005 by President Hamid Karzai, Khalid was shifted from Ghazni province to become the new governor of Kandahar province. As governor, he said that he believed in the coordination of international and national efforts in bringing stability to Afghanistan. In early 2007, Asadullah Khalid escaped an assassination attempt. He was targeted by a Taliban suicide bomber. His motorcade was destroyed but he survived with only minor injuries.

Mr. Khalid was appointed as Minister of Borders, ethnics and tribal Affairs in 2008. In 2011, besides being in-charge of the Ministry, he was appointed as special representative of the President to Loy Kandahar provinces (i.e. Kandahar, Helmand, Zabul, and Urozgan). As a trusted envoy of the president ( Hamid Karzai ) and security expert, he brought stability and peace to South Western provinces in short while.

In October 2011 Khalid survived another attempt on his life. A year later, in September 2012, the National Assembly of Afghanistan approved him as head of the National Directorate of Security (NDS), which is the Afghan intelligence service. It is very similar to that of the U.S. Department of Homeland Security (DHS) from which it receives training and support.

To eradicate Taliban and confront them in the gross-roots he implemented many concepts, beside his other attempts he created and supported the anti-Taliban uprisings in insurgent-held areas of eastern Afghanistan, and often accused the Pakistani intelligence services of fomenting the insurgency.

A few months later, on 6 December 2012, Khalid became injured during a failed Taliban assassination attempt in Kabul. The incident happened in the Taymeni area of the city, inside one of the many guesthouses that NDS uses in Kabul to reduce the risk of an attack. Afghan officials said that Khalid needed blood transfusions, but President Hamid Karzai said Khalid "is doing well" and described the attack as "a cowardly act of terrorism". Zabiullah Mujahid confirmed that the Taliban were behind the attack. Politicians in Afghanistan, including the President and members of the Parliament, accused elements in Pakistan of organizing Khalid's assassination attempt.

In June 2013, Khalid returned to US for further medical treatment after his conditions deteriorated for wounds from the Taliban assassination attempted in December 2012. Rahmatullah Nabil resumed the role as acting Director of the NDS from 31 August 2013 whilst Khalid was recovering. Nabil was officially reappointed as Director on 28 January 2015.

Asadullah Khalid remains under treatment today and has been unable to perform his duties as minister. Former President Ashraf Ghani has also explained his absence as the reason for the fall of Kabul.

== Human right violations ==
Asadullah Khalid has been accused of being involved in numerous human right violations. In 2009, Richard Colvin, a former Canadian deputy ambassador to Afghanistan who worked closely with Khalid, testified before the Canadian parliament that Khalid was directly involved in torture. He said that Khalid was controlling a criminal gang and he had people killed who got in his way.

In April 2010, CBC News revealed the existence of top-level Canadian government documents reporting the personal involvement of Khalid in serious human rights abuses in his own private dungeon. Multiple sources report that the private detention centre was located under Khalid's guest house while he was the governor of Kandahar. The documents also showed that Christopher Alexander, a Canadian official working with the United Nations, alleged that Asadullah Khalid had ordered the killing of five United Nations workers by bombing, presumably to protect his narcotics interests.

Graeme Smith from The Globe and Mail conducted an investigation on Brigade 888 (a unit under the direct command of Khalid) and found that Khalid's governor palace contained private detention centres. Graeme Smith further said that the Canadian Generals knew about the brutal technique employed to torture the detainees in those cells. A source from Afghanistan said that the palace hired a labourer every few weeks to apply fresh paint to the interrogation room. This was done to conceal blood on the walls. The source also reported the presence of other informal cells in the city which are operated by Khalid.

Khalid was also accused being involved in act of sexual violence against the women and the girls. Human Rights Watch stated that there is a 'strong evidence' which suggests that Khalid was involved in act of sexual violence against women and girls, when he was governor of Ghazni and Kandahar. Khalid allegedly threatened the victims with consequences if they told anyone about what happened.

== Drug smuggling ==
Asadullah Khalid was also accused of being involved in drug trafficking. Kabul Press in 2009, while citing several sources from the Afghan presidential palace, described Khalid as "the most crucial member of a narcotics producing and smuggling syndicate". Ambassador Wahid Monawar, during his tenure as Afghanistan's permanent representative to the United Nations in Vienna in 2007, said that Khalid had no plan to eradicate opium from the province and neither was he interested to follow the existing plan.

== See also ==
- Politics of Afghanistan

Preceded by ?	Governor of Ghazni Province, Afghanistan; 2002–2005	Succeeded by Sher Alam Ibrahimi
Preceded by Yousef Pashtun	Governor of Kandahar Province, Afghanistan; 2005–2008	Succeeded by Rahmatullah Raufi
Preceded by ?	Minister of Tribal and Border Affairs, Afghanistan; 2008–September 15, 2012	Succeeded by ?
Preceded by Rahmatullah Nabil	Head of the National Directorate of Security (NDS), Afghanistan; September 15, 2012-present	Succeeded by Incumbent
