= Islamabad Accord (1993) =

1993 peace agreement between Afghan militant groups

- Type: Peace treaty Power sharing deal
- Signed: 7 March 1993
- Location: Islamabad, Pakistan
- Replaces: Peshawar Accord
- Mediators: Pakistan
- Negotiators: Islamic State of Afghanistan; Hezb-e Islami Gulbuddin
- Signatories: Islamic State of Afghanistan; Hezb-e Islami Gulbuddin
- Depositary: Government of Pakistan
- Languages: Dari; Urdu; English

The Islamabad Accord was a peace and power-sharing agreement signed on 7 March 1993 between the warring parties in the War in Afghanistan (1992–1996), one party being the Islamic State of Afghanistan and the other an alliance of militias led by Gulbuddin Hekmatyar. The Defense Minister of Afghanistan, Ahmad Shah Massoud, resigned his position in exchange for peace, as requested by Hekmatyar who saw Massoud as a personal rival. Hekmatyar took the long-offered position of prime minister. The agreement proved short-lived, however, as Gulbuddin Hekmatyar and his allies soon resumed the bombardment of Kabul.

== Text of the Islamabad Accord ==
An excerpt from the text of the Islamabad Accord as provided by the University of Ulster:

Excerpt from the Islamabad Accord
All the parties and groups concerned have agreed as follows:

To the formation of a Government for a period of 18 months in which President Burhanuddin Rabbani would remain President and Eng. Gulbedin Hikmatyar or his nominee would assume the office of Prime Minister. The powers of the President and Prime Minister and his cabinet which have been formulated through mutual consultations will form part of this Accord and is annexed;

The Cabinet shall be formed by the Prime Minister in consultations with the President, and leaders of Mujahideen Parties within two weeks of the signing of this Accord;

The following electoral process is agreed for implementation in a period of not more than 18 months with effect from 29 December 1992;

(a) The immediate formation of an independent Election Commission by all parties with full powers;

(b) The Election Commission shall be mandated to hold elections for a Grand Constituent Assembly within eight months from the date of signature of this Accord;

(c) The duly elected Grant Constituent Assembly shall formulate a Constitution under which general elections for the President and the Parliament shall be held within the prescribed period of 18 months mentioned above.

A defence Council comprising two members from each party will be set up to, inter alia,

(a) Enable the formation of a national army;

(b) Take possession of heavy weapons from all parties and sources which may be removed from Kabul and other cities and kept out of range to ensure the security of the Capital;

(c) Ensure that all roads in Afghanistan are kept open for normal use;

(d) Ensure that State funds shall not be used to finance private armies or armed retainers;

(e) Ensure that operational control of the armed forces shall be with the Defence Council.

There shall be immediate and unconditional release of all Afghan detainees held by the Government and different parties during the armed hostilities. All public and private buildings, residential areas and properties occupied by different armed groups during the hostilities shall be returned to their original owners. Effective steps shall be taken to facilities the return of displaced persons to their respective homes and locations.

An All Party Committee shall be constituted to supervise control over the monetary system and currency regulations to keep it in conformity with existing Afghan banking laws and regulations.

A cease-fire shall come into force with immediate effect. After the formation of the Cabinet, there shall be permanent cessation of hostilities.

A Joint Commission comprising representatives of the Organization of the Islamic Conference and of all Afghan parties shall be formed to monitor the cease-fire and cessation of hostilities.

== Aftermath ==
The Defense Minister of Afghanistan, Ahmad Shah Massoud, resigned his position in exchange for peace, as requested by Hekmatyar who saw Massoud as a personal rival. Burhanuddin Rabbani, belonging to the same party as Massoud, remained president while Gulbuddin Hekmatyar took the long-offered position of prime minister.

Only two days after the Islamabad Accord was put into effect, however, Hekmatyar's allies of Hezb-e Wahdat were again rocketing areas in Kabul. Both the Wahhabi Pashtun Ittehad-i Islami of Abdul Rasul Sayyaf backed by Saudi Arabia and the Shia Hazara Hezb-e Wahdat supported by Iran remained involved in heavy fighting against each other. Hekmatyar proved afraid to enter Kabul proper, chairing only one cabinet meeting. Pulitzer Prize-winning author Roy Gutman of the United States Institute of Peace wrote in How We Missed the Story: Osama bin Laden, the Taliban, and the Hijacking of Afghanistan:

Hekmatyar had become prime minister ... But after chairing one cabinet meeting, Hekmatyar never returned to the capital, fearing, perhaps, a lynching by Kabulis infuriated over his role in destroying their city. Even his close aides were embarrassed. Hekmatyar spokesman Qutbuddin Helal was still setting up shop in the prime minister's palace when the city came under Hezb[-i Islami] rocket fire late that month. "We are here in Kabul and he is rocketing us. Now we have to leave. We can't do anything," he told Massoud aides.

Hekmatyar, who was generally opposed to coalition government but strived for undisputed power, had disputes with other parties over the selection of cabinet members and again launched major attacks against Kabul for one month. The President, Burhanuddin Rabbani, was attacked when he attempted to meet Hekmatyar. Massoud resumed his responsibilities as minister of defence consolidating his control over regions north of Kabul. Helmand had continued to be in the hands of Najibullah era paramilitary commander Abdul Jabar Qahraman, being run as a secular enclave while nominally being allied with fellow Pashtun, Gulbuddin Hekmatyar. Rabbani's senior commander Ismail Khan who was an ethnic Tajik, was able to drive Abdul Jabar Qahraman's secular Pashtun paramilitary from Helmand province.

In May 1993, a new attempt was made to reinstate the Islamabad Accord. In August, Massoud again extended a hand to Hekmatyar in an attempt to broaden the government. By the end of 1993, however, Gulbuddin Hekmatyar and former communist general and militia leader, Abdul Rashid Dostum, were involved in secret negotiations encouraged by Pakistan's Inter-Services Intelligence, Iran's intelligence service and Uzbekistan's Karimov administration. They planned a coup to oust the Rabbani administration and to attack Massoud in his northern areas.

In January 1994, Hekmatyar and Dostum mounted a destructive bombardment campaign against the capital and attacked Massoud's core areas in the northeast. The attacks conducted by Hekmatyar and Dostum killed ten thousand civilians according to some estimates and 25,000 civilians according other estimates. Dostum's spokesperson (Uzbek) claimed Rabbani was running the country only in accord with Tajik interests. But Amin Saikal, Director of the Centre for Arab and Islamic Studies at the Australian National University, writes Hekmatyar had the following objectives in all his operations including this attempted coup: "The first was to make sure that Rabbani and Massoud were not allowed to consolidate power, build a credible administration, or expand their territorial control, so that the country would remain divided into small fiefdoms, run by various Muajhideen leaders and local warlords or a council of such elements, with only some of them allied to Kabul. The second was to ensure the Rabbani government acquired no capacity to dispense patronage, and to dissuade the Kabul population from giving more than limited support to the government. The third was to make Kabul an unsafe city for representatives of the international community and to prevent the Rabbani government from attracting the international support needed to begin the post-war reconstruction of Afghanistan and generate a level of economic activity which would enhance its credibility and popularity." Gulbuddin Hekmatyar received extensive support by neighbouring Pakistan. However, Saikal is known to be prejudiced against both Pakistan and Hekmatyar; contrary to his account, Hekmatyar was an extreme centralist and did not want to divide Afghanistan but instead put it under his unchallenged rule. Nor did Pakistan, who had facilitated the Accord, support Hekmatyar after 1992; in fact, his bombardment ruined their attempts to give him the lion's share of government and his relations with Pakistani spymaster Javed Nasir, a friend of Massoud, were particularly poor.

By mid-1994, Hekmatyar and Dostum were on the defensive in Kabul against Islamic State forces led by Massoud. By early 1995, the Islamic State had been able to secure the capital. It began to restore some law and order, and to start basic public services. Massoud initiated a nationwide political process with the goal of national consolidation and democratic elections. But the Taliban, which had emerged over the course of 1994 in southern Afghanistan, were already at the doors of the capital city.

== See also ==
- Islamic State of Afghanistan
