= Mullah Ezat =

Mullah Ezat (Mullah Izzat, Ezatullah)
- Born: Afghanistan
- Military career
- Allegiance: Ittihad-i Islami; Jamiat-e Islami
- Conflicts: Afshar Operation

Mullah Ezat, also rendered as Mullah Izzat or Ezatullah, was an Afghan military commander from Paghman, Afghanistan. During the Afghan civil war, he was associated with the forces of Ittihad-i Islami, led by Abdul Rasul Sayyaf, and with Jamiat-e Islami.

During the resistance against the Soviet-backed Afghan government, Ezat was reported to have been a member of Ahmad Shah Massoud's Supervisory Council of the North, where he allegedly commanded approximately 600 men.

== Afshar Operation ==
Ezat was reportedly involved in the planning of the Afshar Operation, a February 1993 military operation in western Kabul that resulted in the deaths of hundreds of civilians.

Human Rights Watch reported that forces under Ezat's command were implicated in abuses during the fighting in Kabul, including kidnapping. One reported case involved the abduction of a person named Bagh-e Daoud, which was attributed to Ezat's men. Other reported attacks against Hazaras were also attributed to forces under his command.
