= Peshawar Accord =

1992 agreement between Afghan mujahideen factions

- First page in the English version as used by the government of Pakistan
- Type: Peace treaty Power sharing deal
- Drafted: 24 April 1992
- Signed: 26 April 1992
- Location: Peshawar, North-West Frontier Province, Pakistan
- Effective: 28 April 1992
- Replaces: 1987 Constitution of Afghanistan
- Replaced by: Islamabad Accord
- Mediators: Pakistan
- Negotiators: Hezb-e Islami Gulbuddin; Hezb-i Islami Khalis; Islamic and National Revolution Movement; Ittehad-e-Islami; Jamiat-e Islami; National Islamic Front; National Liberation Front
- Signatories: Hezb-e Islami Gulbuddin; Hezb-i Islami Khalis; Islamic and National Revolution Movement; Ittehad-e-Islami; Jamiat-e Islami; National Islamic Front; National Liberation Front
- Depositary: Government of Pakistan
- Languages: Dari; Pashto; English

The Peshawar Accord (Note: Urdu: پشاور معاہدہ, romanized: Peśāwar Mu'āhida; Dari: توافق پشاور; Pashto: د پیښور تړون) was an agreement signed on 26 April 1992 in Peshawar, Pakistan, between various Afghan mujahideen factions, brokered by Pakistan, during the fall of the communist Republic of Afghanistan. It established the Islamic State of Afghanistan with a coalition government as part of the power-sharing deal.

A notable opponent of a coalition government was Gulbuddin Hekmatyar, leader of Hezb-e Islami, who had since March 1992 opposed these attempts to form a coalition government and sought to continue waging a war against the government in Kabul.

The accord proclaimed an Afghan interim to start serving on 28 April 1992. Due to rivalling forces contending for total power, that interim government was paralyzed right from the start.

Afghan mujahideen parties discussing in Peshawar, Pakistan had on 26 April 1992 agreed on proclaiming a leadership council assuring residual powers for the party leaders under an interim President Sibghatullah Mojaddedi or Mujaddidi (a religious leader) serving from 28 April to 28 June 1992. Jamiat-e Islami's leader Burhanuddin Rabbani would then succeed him as interim President until 28 October, and also in 1992 a national shura was to ratify a provisional constitution and choose an interim government for eighteen months, followed by elections. In the Peshawar Accord, Ahmad Shah Massoud was appointed as interim minister of defense for the Mujaddidi government.

== Historical background ==
The flag of Afghanistan in the months following the accord's signing.

In April 1992, the Soviet-backed Afghan communist government of Mohammad Najibullah could no longer sustain itself against the Afghan mujahideen. Ahmad Shah Massoud's mujahideen, allied with Sayyid Mansor's Ismailis and former communist general Abdul Rashid Dostum's forces, captured Afghanistan's major air force base Bagram, seventy kilometers north of Kabul. Senior communist generals and officials of the Najibullah administration acted as a transitional authority to transfer power to Ahmad Shah Massoud's alliance. The Kabul interim authority invited Massoud to enter Kabul as the new Head of State, but he held back. Massoud ordered his forces, positioned to the north of Kabul, not to enter the capital until a political solution was in place. He called on the senior party leaders based in exile in Peshawar to work out a political settlement acceptable to all sides and parties.

Meanwhile, other mujahideen factions were starting to advance towards the capital city Kabul from different sides, Gulbuddin Hekmatyar's Hezb-e Islami from the south, Abdul Rasul Sayyaf's Ittehad-e Islami from the west, Abdul Ali Mazari's Hezb-e Wahdat also from the west and the Hezb-e Islami Khalis from the east.

The international community in the form of the United Nations and most Afghan political parties decided to appoint a legitimate national government, to succeed communist rule, through an elite settlement among the different resistance parties.

While the external Afghan party leaders were meeting in Peshawar, the military situation around Kabul involving the internal commanders was tense. While Massoud supported the Peshawar process of establishing a broad coalition government inclusive of all sides, Hekmatyar sought to become the sole ruler of Afghanistan stating, "In our country coalition government is impossible because, this way or another, it is going to be weak and incapable of stabilizing the situation in Afghanistan." Massoud pertained: "All the parties had participated in the war, in jihad in Afghanistan, so they had to have their share in the government, and in the formation of the government. Afghanistan is made up of different nationalities. We were worried about a national conflict between different tribes and different nationalities. In order to give everybody their own rights and also to avoid bloodshed in Kabul, we left the word to the parties so they should decide about the country as a whole. We talked about it for a temporary stage and then after that the ground should be prepared for a general election."

A recorded radio communication between the two leaders showed the divide as Massoud asked Hekmatyar: "The Kabul regime is ready to surrender, so instead of the fighting we should gather. ... The leaders are meeting in Peshawar. ... The troops should not enter Kabul, they should enter later on as part of the government." Hekmatyar's response: "We will march into Kabul with our naked sword. No one can stop us. ... Why should we meet the leaders?" Massoud answered: "It seems to me that you don't want to join the leaders in Peshawar nor stop your threat, and you are planning to enter Kabul ... in that case I must defend the people."

At that point even Osama bin Laden, who had worked extensively with Hekmatyar in Peshawar, urged Hekmatyar to "go back with your brothers" and to accept a compromise with the other resistance parties. But Hekmatyar refused, confident that he would be able to gain sole power in Afghanistan.

== Text of the Peshawar Accord ==
The text of the Peshawar Accord as provided by the United Nations and the University of Ulster:

Peshawar Accord
In the Name of Allah, the Most Beneficent, the Most Merciful

Salutation and peace be upon the Great Messenger of Allah and his Progeny and Companions.

The structure and process for the provisional period of the Islamic State of Afghanistan, was formed as under:

1. It was decided that a 51 persons body, headed by Hazrat Sahib Sibghatullah Mojaddedi, would go inside Afghanistan so that they could take over power from the present rulers of Kabul, completely and without any terms and conditions during the two months period. The head of this body will also represent the Presidency of the State during these two months. After this period, this body will remain as an interim Islamic Council, along with the Transitional State and its Chairmanship will be held by Hazrat Sahib. The period of this Council, will also be for four (4) months.

2. It was decided that Professor Rabbani will remain as the President of the Transitional Islamic State of Afghanistan and the head of the Leadership Council for four (4) months. He will commence his work officially at the time when the two months of the transfer of power will be elapsed.

3. The above-mentioned period will not be extended even by a day.

4. The Prime Minister and other members of the Cabinet will be appointed from the second grade members of the Tanzeemat, on the discretion of the heads of the Tanzeemat.

5. The Prime Ministership was assigned to the Hizb-e-Islami, Afghanistan.

6. The Deputy Prime Ministership and the Ministry of Interior, to Ittehad-e-Islami, Afghanistan.

7. The Deputy Prime Ministership and the Ministry of Education, to Hizb-e-Islamic of Maulvi Khalis.

8. The Deputy Prime Ministership and the Ministry of Foreign Affairs to the National Islamic Front.

9. The Ministry of Defence to Jamiat-e-Islami, Afghanistan.

10. The Supreme Court to Harkat-e-Inqilab-e-Islami Organization.

11. It was also decided that the Leadership Council, in addition to making the division of appointments in the Ministries, will also determine Ministries for Hizb-e-Wahdat, Shura-e-Etelaf (Council of Coalition) Maulvi Mansoor and other brothers.

12. The total period of this process will be six months. As regards to Transitional Government, the Islamic Council, will make unanimous decision. The period of this Transitional Government will be two (2) years.

== See also ==
- Islamic State of Afghanistan

== Bibliography ==
- Saikal, Amin (2004). Modern Afghanistan: A History of Struggle and Survival. I.B.Tauris. ISBN 978-0-85771-478-7.
