= Musa Khan Ahmadzai =

Afghan politician (born 1956)

Musa Khan Akbarzada موسی خان اکبرزاده
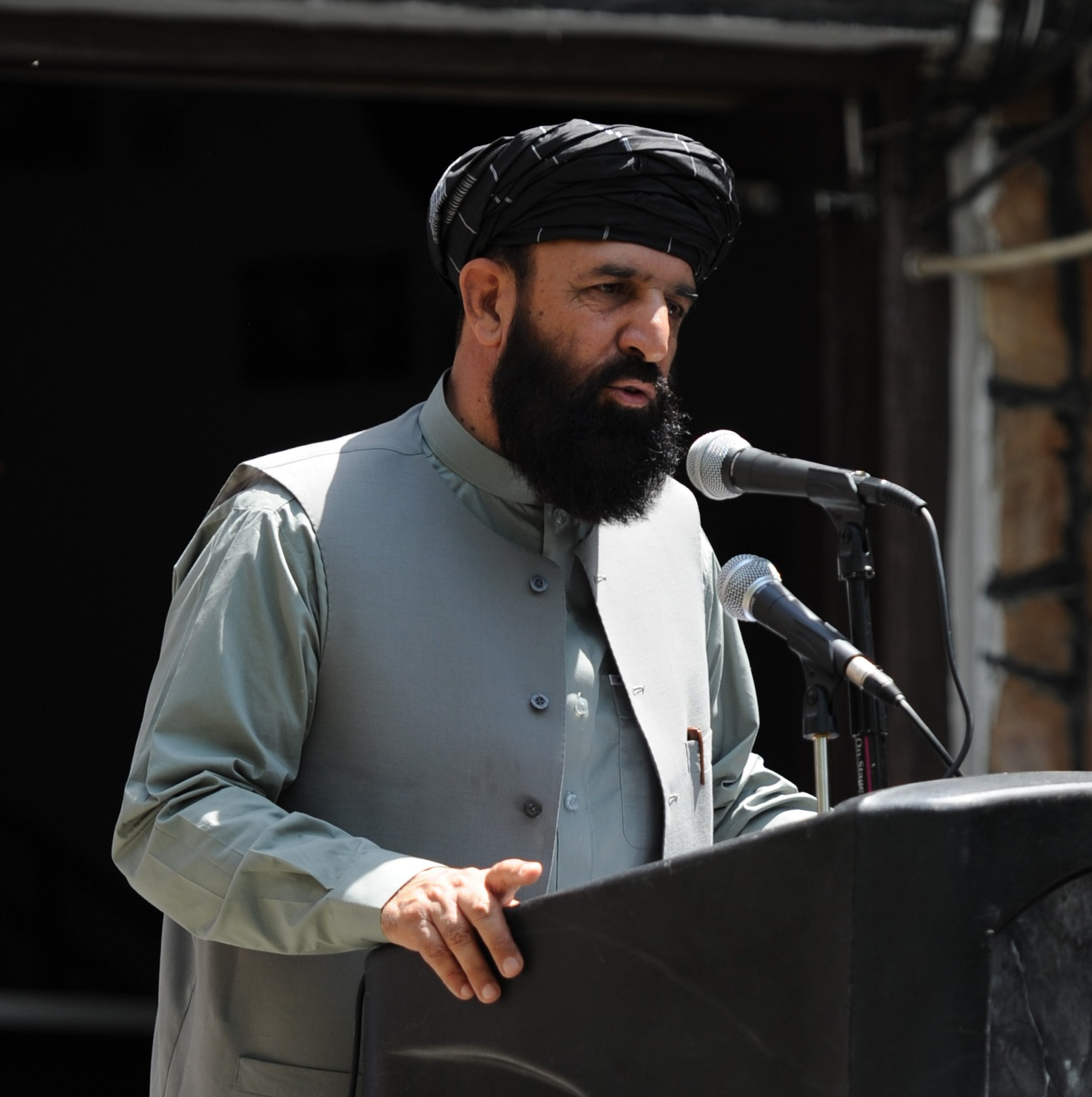
- Musa Khan speaking in July 2011

Governor of Ghazni province, Afghanistan
- In office 16 May 2010 – 2 September 2015
- Preceded by: Osman Osmani
- Succeeded by: Mohammad Aman Hamimi

Personal details
- Born: 1956 (age 69–70) Paktia Province

General Musa Khan Akbarzada (born 1956, in Paktia Province) is a politician in Afghanistan. He served as the governor of Ghazni province from 2010 to 2015. He is an ethnic Pashtun from the Ahmadzai tribe. His former careers include Consul General in Afghan consulate general in Peshawar, Pakistan, during the government of Burhanuddin Rabbani in early 1990s, after this he was appointed as Afghan Ambassador to Riyadh Kingdom of Saudi Arabia.

He is an IMA (Indian Military Academy) graduate who holds a master's degree from Jawaharlal Nehru University in India and a second master's degree from Dawat University in Kabul, Afghanistan.

Prior to that he was a commander for Abdul Rasul Sayyaf and before that he was a Cadet in the Afghan National Army, during the time of the Daud Khan administration in the 1970s.

Since 2002, he has owned and operated Akbarzada Construction Company, a private construction company in Afghanistan.

He has been praised by The New York Times for, among other things, supporting girls' education.

Preceded by Osman Osmani	Governor of Ghazni province, Afghanistan; June 2008 – present	Succeeded by Incumbent
