= List of governors of Ghazni =

This is a list of the governors of the province of Ghazni, Afghanistan.

== Governors of Ghazni Province ==
Governor	Period	Extra	Note
Taj Mohammad Qari Baba	December 2001 late 2002		
Asadullah Khalid	late 2002; June 28, 2005		
Sher Alam Ibrahimi	June 29, 2005; September 19, 2006		
Mirajuddin Patan	September 19, 2006; September 18, 2007		
Faizanullah Faizan	September 18, 2007; March 3, 2008		
Shir Khosti	March 3, 2008; May 31, 2008		
Osman Osmani	May 31, 2008; May 15, 2010		
Musa Khan	May 16, 2010; 2015		
Mohammad Aman Hamimi	2015; July 30, 2016		
Abdul Karim Matin	July 30, 2016; February 16, 2018		
Wahidullah Kalimzai	June 01, 2018; May 28, 2021		
Mohammed Daoud Laghmani	May 29, 2021; August 12, 2021		
Mullah Mohammadzai (Sadiq)	2021; 7 November 2021	under Islamic Emirate of Afghanistan	
Ishaq Akhundzada	7 November 2021; Present	under Islamic Emirate of Afghanistan	

== See also ==
- List of current governors of Afghanistan
