= Islamabad Accord =

Islamabad Accord can refer to:

- Islamabad Accord (1993), a peace and power-sharing agreement signed on 7 March 1993 between the warring parties in the War in Afghanistan (1992–1996)
- Islamabad Accord (2026), proposed ceasefire agreement in the 2026 Iran War
