= Akhundzada (disambiguation) =

Hibatullah Akhundzada (born 1967) is the supreme leader of Afghanistan since 2021.

Akhundzada is a surname that may also refer to:

- Abdur Razzaq Akhundzada (born 1958), Afghan politician
- Amir Muhammad Akhundzada (born 1977), Afghan politician
- Hamidullah Akhundzada (fl. 1996), Minister of Civil Aviation and Transport of Afghanistan
- Hemat Akhundzada (fl. 2021), former acting Minister of Education of Afghanistan
- Ishaq Akhundzada (fl. 2021), Governor of Ghazni
- Mohammad Nasim Akhundzada (died 1990), mujahideen commander in Helmand Province, Afghanistan
- Mohammad Younus Akhundzada (fl. 2021), Rural Minister of Afghanistan
- Sher Mohammad Akhundzada (fl. 2001), Governor of Helmand Province, Afghanistan

== Places ==
- Akhundzadeh, village in Sistan and Baluchestan, Iran

== See also ==
- Akhundzade
