= Anwar Dangar =

Anwar Dangar انور دانگر
- Born: Shakar Dara, Kabul Province, Afghanistan
- Died: 2004; Pakistan
- Military career
- Allegiance: Jamiat-e Islami, Taliban
- Rank: Commander
- Conflicts: Afshar Operation

Anwar Dangar was a commander from Shakar-Darrah (Shakar Dara), which is located approximately 25 kilometres north of Kabul, and was an ally of Burhanuddin Rabbani's Jamiat-e-Islami. He was reported involved in the planning of the Afshar Operation which resulted in the deaths of hundreds of civilians and furthermore he is said to have directly lead troops into the battle.

As a Pashtu speaker it was reported on 17 October 1996 that he joined, along with his forces, the Taliban. However within a few days he deserted and on Massoud's orders recaptured Shakar-Darrah. A report in August 1997 claims that the Taliban "primarily" blamed their military "setbacks" north of Kabul on the betrayal of Dangar, who they claimed had let Massoud fighters into Charikar, and other commanders.

It was reported that 5 March 2001 he was wounded by unknown gunmen.

Following the victory of the Taliban, Dangar joined the Taliban and stayed there following their collapse in 2001. He was listed as one of the 12 most wanted Taliban commanders. He was reported to be in the Pakistani city of Peshawar, trying to bring together escaped commanders. According to another report he was in charge of the Taliban in the three central provinces of Parwan, Kapisa, Wardak, and Kabul where he had considerable local support.

Anwar was reportedly assassinated in Pakistan in 2004.
