= Dawa'a al-Jihad =

Militant university in Pakistan

Dawa'a al-Jihad (Arabic: "Call to Struggle") was a militant university established at an Afghan refugee camp near Peshawar, Pakistan, by Abdul Rasul Sayyaf in the 1980s.

== Alumni ==
- Abdul Sami Yousafzai, Afghan journalist
