= Rahmatullah Nabil =

Afghan politician and security official (born 1968)

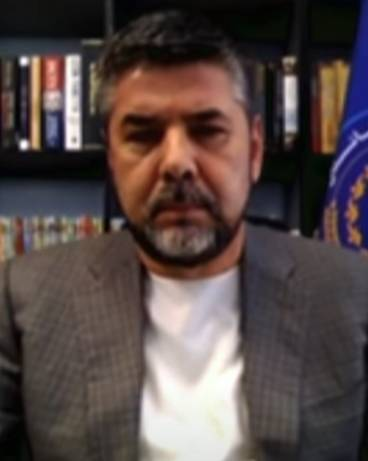
- Nabil in 2019

Director of the National Directorate of Security Acting
- In office 31 August 2013 – 10 December 2015
- Preceded by: Asadullah Khalid
- Succeeded by: Massoud Andarabi (acting)
- In office 5 July 2010 – 29 August 2012
- Preceded by: Ibrahim Spinzada
- Succeeded by: Asadullah Khalid

Personal details
- Born: 30 June 1968 (age 58) Jaghatu District, Afghanistan
- Education: University of Peshawar

Rahmatullah Nabil (born 30 June 1968) is an Afghan politician. He served as head of the National Directorate of Security (NDS) from 2010 to 2012. On September 1, 2013, he was reappointed as acting Director due to the health problems suffered by Asadullah Khalid following an attempted assassination. Nabil was officially reappointed as the full-time Director of the NDS on 28 January 2015.

Nabil has been blamed for failing to stop the spread of Taliban violence in 2015.

== Biography ==
Mr. Rahmatullah Nabil was born in Jaghato district of Maidan Wardak province of Afghanistan. He is a civil engineer and speaks fluent Dari, Pashto and English.

Mr. Nabil has held several government positions since 2002. He joined Afghan government as Deputy National Security Advisor. He later helped establish the President Protection Service (PPS) and served as its head. PPS has been described as a leading security service within the Afghan government and as distinctive in the region.

In 2010, he was appointed as Director General of the National Directorate of Security (NDS), country’s principal intelligence agency and has served in the agency for two years. During his tenure in NDS his vision was to bring reforms in order to increase the effectiveness and operational capability of NDS.

After two years, he was appointed as Deputy National Security Advisor and then he rejoined the NDS as acting General Director in September 2013. Before 2002, he served in several branches of UNHCR and he was mainly working on aid supplying to the Afghan refugees. Nabil has no political affiliation and has served as high rank military officer with complete political neutrality and has only Afghan citizenship.

He resigned in December 2015 as NDS director.

Nabil was a candidate in the 2019 Afghan Presidential elections. He finished in 4th position with 1.86% of the total votes. Nabil publicly boycotted the elections and rejected the final result.

He successfully fled Afghanistan for an undisclosed location following the 2021 Taliban offensive.

On 16 January 2023, Nabil established a new party in exile called the Afghanistan National Liberty Party (ANLP).

== Career ==
Mr. Nabil was appointed as a director of the National Directorate of Security (NDS) by President Karzai following NDS former directors' serious injury in a terrorist attack in 2012. Mr. Nabil had a rough time in his intelligence service and was removed by President Hamid Karzai. The president said he wanted to keep the service term short, but Mr. Nabil publicly announced that President Karzai asked him to resign due to their disagreements over policies, such as torturing, misbehaving, and discrimination against detainees during the persecution process The President was also not happy because he thought Mr. Nabil was failing to stop Taliban influence in Afghan security forces as they were hiring spies that caused fatal casualties and harm to security forces. The insurgents were improving their tactics and finding new ways to damage and inflict higher casualties on the Afghan security forces and destroy the infrastructures and government facilities. They were making homemade bombs, and improvised explosive devices, buying weapons from Afghan security forces, weapon and drug trafficking, suicide attacks, and drug trafficking which provided financial support that inflicted heavy casualties on the forces. Financial support enabled the Taliban to keep the war ongoing for many years. President Ghani accused Mr. Nabil of failing to prevent the plans and attacks from their origin. This brought Nabil's capabilities of handling the intelligence agency under serious questions, so President Ghani stepped him down. Mr. Nabil stayed engaged in the political arena of Afghanistan after his official position in the government. As he led a team to monitor the presidential elections, he and his team accused President Ashraf Ghani of appointing a loyal team in a higher-level government position which could pave the way to electoral fraud in Ashraf Ghani's favor. However, President Ghani's spokesman denied the allegation and asserted that the government had a normal operation.

== Awards ==
Nabil has two decorations and medals, Ghazi Ayoub Khan’s medal a high military decoration and Ghazi Wazir Mohammad Akbar Khan’s medal. He has received an appreciation letter from the Afghan Civil Society Association, for his effective efforts in the implementation and oversight of human rights in all NDS detention center.
