= Mohammad Nabi Mohammadi =

Afghan politician and mujahideen leader (1920–2002)

Mawlawi Mohammad Nabi Mohammadi
- محمد نبي محمدي
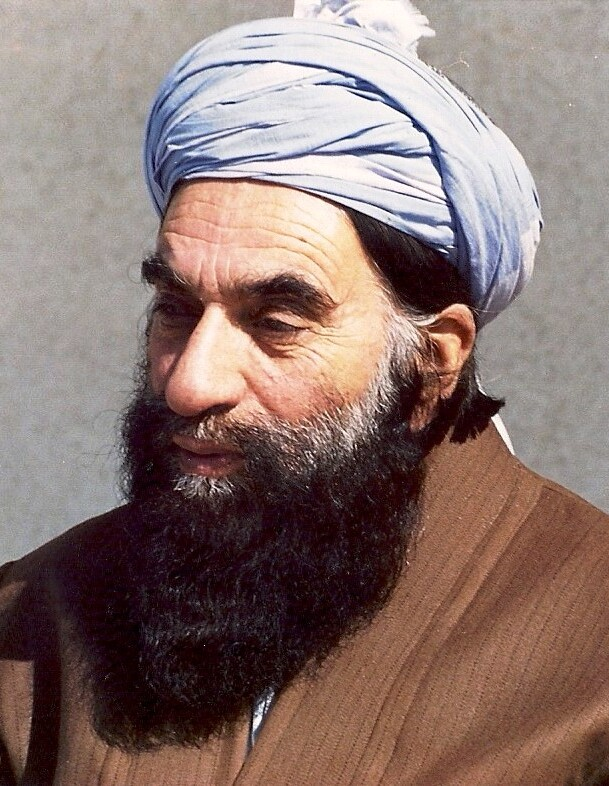
- Mohammadi c. 1990s

Vice President of Afghanistan
- In office 1994–1996
- President: Burhanuddin Rabbani
- Preceded by: Mohammad Shah Fazli
- Succeeded by: Hedayat Amin Arsala (2001); Mohammed Fahim (2001); Sima Samar (2001); Mohammad Mohaqiq (2001); Ahmed Shakar Karkar (2001)

Member of the House of the People
- In office 1965–1973
- Constituency: Barak-i-Barak

Personal details
- Born: 1920 Baraki Barak District, Logar Province, Emirate of Afghanistan
- Died: 21 April 2002 (aged 81–82) Rawalpindi, Pakistan
- Cause of death: Tuberculosis
- Resting place: Baraki Barak, Logar Province

Military service
- Years of service: 1965–2002
- Commands: Harakat-i-Inqilab-i-Islami
- Battles/wars: Soviet–Afghan War

Mohammad Nabi Mohammadi (Pashto: محمد نبي محمدي; 1920–21 April 2002) was an Afghan politician and mujahideen leader who was the founder and leader of the Harakat-i-Inqilab-i-Islami (Islamic Revolution Movement) political party and paramilitary group. He served as Vice President of Afghanistan under the mujahideen from January 1993 to 1996.

== Biography ==
Muhammad Nabi Muhammadi was born in 1920 in Baraki Barak District, of Logar Province in Afghanistan. His grandfather, who migrated to Logar, was originally from the central Ghazni province. Mohammadi received his initial Islamic education from his religious father, and received secondary and high Islamic education from various well-known scholars in the Logar Province. In 1946, when he was 26, he finished all Islamic education and began to teach. He soon became famous for his profound classical knowledge, intellectual enlightenment, practical wisdom and spirituality. Students from all areas of Afghanistan gathered around him and most of them later became a part of his Islamic Revolution Movement (Harakat-i-Inqilab-i-Islami).

This was during a time when Afghanistan had lost many of its Islamic traditions, and communism was slowly beginning to spread throughout the country. He contacted several ulema and created a strong union of religious scholars to oppose Soviet propaganda and attempt to inform the general population on the problems of communism.

=== Political activities ===
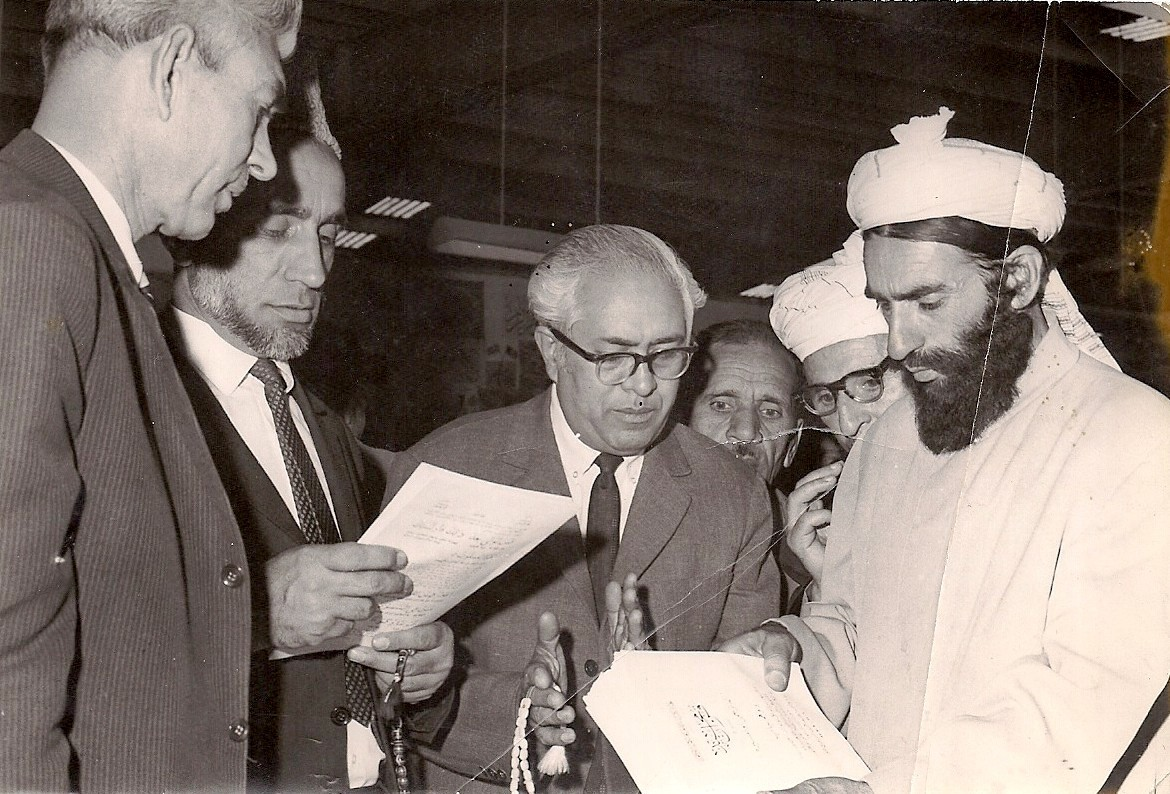
Mohammadi with fellow Afghan parliamentarians

In 1958, while some of the other scholars were already carrying out anti-communist activities, Mohammad Nabi Mohammadi began preaching against communism to people who would listen, travelling far and wide to many of the provinces in Afghanistan.

In 1965, he was elected to the Afghan parliament from his home district of Barak-i-Barak representing the traditional religious scholars. As one of only a handful of religious scholars in the parliament, he took it upon himself to be a first line of defense against the Marxist deputies such as Babrak Karmal, Hafizullah Amin, Noor Ahad and Anahita Ratebzad, and strongly opposed the Marxist movement in Afghanistan by making indirect political alliance with the Capitalist block through pro-capitalist establishment of Pakistan.

Nabi's most famous experience in the parliament was an altercation with Babrak Karmal that led to Karmal being hospitalised. He is also known for a comprehensive speech in a parliament session that was played on radio stations across Afghanistan.

=== Upheavals in Afghanistan ===
Daud Khan came to power at the end of the parliament session in a 1973 coup. When the parliament was dissolved by President Daud, Nabi Muhammadi returned to teaching in madrasas, first in Logar and then in Helmand. The Saur Revolution is the name given to the communist People's Democratic Party of Afghanistan (PDPA) takeover of political power from the government of Afghanistan on 28 April 1978. The coup was soon followed by imprisonment and mass killing of the prominent Afghan religious scholars, tribal leaders and reformers.

After his brother Mullah Jan was captured (he was later killed by the Taraki Government), Muhamamd Nabi Muhammadi fled, moving to the city of Quetta in neighboring Pakistan.Soon after, as the U.S launched "Operation Cyclone" against the Soviet Union with the alliance of Pakistan and Kingdom of Saudi Arabia, he gathered a large number of religious scholars in Quetta to make qualified political and military activities against the Soviet occupation inside Afghanistan .

=== Islamic Revolutionary Movement ===
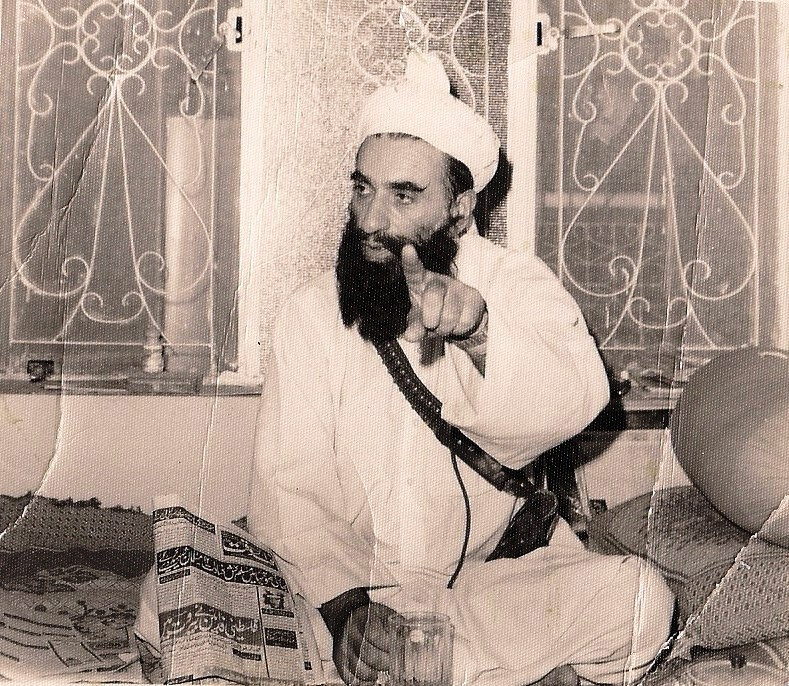
Mohammadi during the Afghan jihad, 1980s

The coup resulted in a massive disgorgement of Afghan religious leaders over the border to Pakistan. Most of these leaders congregated in Peshawar and tried to make contact with the leadership of two already established organizations, Hezb-e Islami and Jamiat-e Islami Afghanistan, which they already knew of because of their declaration of jihad and clandestine distribution of publications critical of President Daud. Newly arrived members of the ulema urged the principals to reunify, but Rabbani and Hekmatyar each refused to accept the other's party as the umbrella. The compromise reached was the creation of a new alliance that was to be called Harakat-i-Inqilab-i-Islami Afghanistan (Islamic Revolution Movement of Afghanistan). After various candidates were proposed and rejected for the position of amir, the assembled members of the ulama decided in early September 1978 on Muhammad Nabi Muhammadi as the leader of the new alliance.

After nearly four months, engineer Gulbuddin Hekmatyar and Burhanuddin Rabbani separated from Harakat-i-Inqilab-i-Islami and founded their own parties by the name of Hizb-e-islami and Jamiat-e-islami. Mohammad Nabi carried the leadership of Harakat-i-Inqilab-i-Islami. It was one of the seven parties that were officially recognized by the Pakistani government and was funded by the US and Arab countries through the Pakistani government.

Mohammadi was among Afghan leaders who met President Ronald Reagan at the White House during the war. Reagan called the rebel leaders "freedom fighters" and compared them with the forefathers of America. Through continuous struggle the Afghan Mujahideen succeeded in their mission, and the Russian forces withdrew from Afghanistan in 1989 after the loss of fifteen thousand of its soldiers. In 1992 the pro-Moscow government in Kabul collapsed, and the mujahideen took power.

=== Vice President ===
Mohammad Nabi Mohammadi became the Vice President of Afghanistan in the mujahideen government. However, when the mujahideen leaders took up arms against each other and the civil war in Afghanistan started, he resigned from his post and forbade the troops loyal to him from taking part in the war. He remained in Pakistan and did his best to stop the war between Gulbuddin Hekmatyar, Burhanuddin Rabbani and Abdul Rasul Sayyaf. In 1996, the Taliban took control of Afghanistan. Most of the Taliban leaders were students of Mohammad Nabi Mohammadi. Mohammadi maintained a good relationship with the Taliban.

=== Death ===
Mohammad Nabi Mohammadi died in a Pakistani hospital on 21 April 2002. He had been suffering from tuberculosis. His body was taken to Logar, Afghanistan, and was given a guard of honour by the government of Afghanistan.

== See also ==
- Politics of Afghanistan
