= National and Islamic Prosperity Party of Afghanistan =

The National and Islamic Prosperity Party of Afghanistan (Persian: حزب سعادت ملی واسلامی افغانستان) is a political party in Afghanistan. It was formed when a local Harakat-e Inqilab-e Islami leader from Sar-e-Pul, Maulawi Muhammad Osman Salekzada, broke away from HII. He was able to take much of the HII organization in northern Afghanistan with him. The party is registered at the Ministry of Justice.
