= Akhundzade =

Akhundzade is an Azerbaijani surname. Notable people with the surname include:

- Abdussalam Akhundzade (1843–1907), Azerbaijani theologian and educator
- Mirza Abu Turab Akhundzade (1817–1910), Azerbaijani theologian and educator
- Mirza Fatali Akhundzade (1812–1878), Iranian Azerbaijani author and philosopher
- Nariman Akhundzade (born 2004), Azerbaijani footballer
- Yusif Akhundzade, Azerbaijani military conductor and director
- Sakina Akhundzade (1865–1927), Azerbaijani playwright
- Shukriyya Akhundzade, wife of the Azerbaijani poet Ahmad Javad and a victim of the Stalinist repressions in Azerbaijan

== See also ==
- Akhundzada
