= Kārte Seh =

Coordinates: 34°30′N 69°08′E

Kārte Seh کارته سه
- Neighborhood of Kabul
- Country: Afghanistan
- Province: Kabul

Kārte Seh (Third Quarter), (Dari: کارته سه) is a neighborhood in western Kabul, Afghanistan, part of District 6. It is a planned and middle-class settlement and is associated with Afghanistan's Shia Hazara minority. Karte Seh is also famous for being the site of the orphanage that Aziza is sent to in Khaled Hosseini's novel A Thousand Splendid Suns.

The district is currently home to foreign missions such as the Russian and Polish embassies, TV stations and the American University of Afghanistan. Many local and international NGOs have offices there. A major road, funded by the United Arab Emirates, is currently under construction in the district. During the Soviet–Afghan War, the Red Cross, CURE International and the IAM all established hospitals in the area, along the arterial Darulaman Road that leads towards the Darul Aman Palace and the National Assembly.
