= Ishaq Akhundzada =

Afghan Taliban politician

Maulvi Mohammad Ishaq Akhundzada
- مولوي محمد اسحاق اخندزاده

Governor of Ghazni
- Incumbent
- Assumed office 7 November 2021
- Supreme Leader: Hibatullah Akhundzada
- Deputy: Sayed Hanif; Qari Gul Haider
- Preceded by: Mullah Mohammadzai (Sadiq)

Maulvi Mohammad Ishaq Akhundzada (Pashto: مولوي محمد اسحاق اخندزاده) is an Afghan Taliban politician who is currently serving as Governor of Ghazni Province since 7 November 2021.
