= Afshar massacre =

1993 military operation in Afghanistan

- Part of Battle of Kabul (1992–1996)
- Location: 36°39′24.17″N 65°42′20.71″E; Afshar, Kabul Afghanistan
- Date: February 11–12, 1993
- Target: Shias; Hazaras; Qizilbash
- Attack type: Massacre
- Deaths: ~700 Civilians killed or disappeared ~4000 Homes looted or destroyed
- Victim: Civilians
- Perpetrators: Islamic State of Afghanistan; Ittehad-e Islami; Junbish-i Milli
- Accused: Ahmad Shah Masoud (denied by masoud), Burhanuddin Rabbani (denied by rabbani), Abdulrab Rasul Sayyaf, Mullah Ezat, Anwar Dangar, Abdul Rashid Dostum

The Afshar Massacre was a state-sponsored military operation in Afghanistan that took place on February 11–12, 1993 during the Second Afghan Civil War. The operation was launched by Ahmad Shah Massoud and Burhanuddin Rabbani's Islamic State of Afghanistan government and the allied Abdulrab Rasul Sayyaf's Ittehad-i Islami paramilitary forces against the densely populated, Hazara majority, Afshar district in west Kabul. The Afshar operation, which saw hundreds of Shia Hazaras systemically targeted and depopulated from villages in the area was considered one of the first such sectarian oriented incident in Afghanistan's modern history. It is also considered to have been one of the worst single events in Afghanistan's wars.

== Background and objectives ==
On April 26, 1992, the Afghan mujahideen leaders announced a new peace and power-sharing agreement, the Peshawar Accords. During the period discussed in this article, the sovereignty of Afghanistan was vested formally in the "Islamic State of Afghanistan", an entity created in April 1992, after the fall of the Soviet-backed Najibullah government through the Peshawar Accords. The legitimate representatives of the government were President Burhanuddin Rabbani and minister of defense Ahmad Shah Massoud.

== Preparation ==
According to a Human Rights Watch report, "credible and consistent" accounts from several officials who worked in Shura-e-Nazar (the informal politico-military organization headed by Massoud) and the Rabbani interim government reveal that a military campaign against Wahdat was planned and approved by officials at the "highest levels" of the Rabbani government.

By February 1993, Massoud had conducted negotiations with dissident Wahdat commanders who signed secret protocols with him in order to avoid a long fight promising to cooperate during the conflict and to capture Mazari and his cabinet.

== Crimes ==
Numerous abuses were reported and large information was collected through interviews by two separate reports – one by Afghanistan Justice Project and another by Human Rights Watch. The abuses largely took place after the military operation itself when forces started to establish posts and to search homes.

The vast majority of testimony regarding the Afshar operation suggests that the abuses were carried out by the Ittihad forces of Abdul Rasul Sayyaf and not the Jamiat forces of Ahmad Shah Massoud. Ittihad forces played a major role in the assault, working directly under Sayyaf and receiving pay from him. The Ittihad forces were not absorbed into the ministry of defense. Sayyaf acted as the de facto general commander of Ittihad forces during the operation and was directly in touch with senior commanders by radio.

== See also ==
- List of massacres in Afghanistan
