= Osman Osmani =

Afghan politician

- عثمان عثمانی

Governor of Ghazni Province, Afghanistan
- In office June 2008 – May 16, 2010
- Preceded by: Sher Mohammad Khostai
- Succeeded by: Musa Khan

Osman Osmani (Persian: عثمان عثمانی) was appointed as the governor of Ghazni Province, Afghanistan in June 2008. He was succeeded by Musa Khan Ahmadzai in 2010. He was governor when Aafia Siddiqui was arrested outside his compound in Ghazni on July 17, 2008.

Preceded by Sher Mohammad Khostai	Governor of Ghazni Province, Afghanistan; June 2008 – 15 May 2010	Succeeded by Musa Khan Ahmadzai
