= Afshar, Kabul =

Afshar افشار اوشار
- Neighborhood
- Coordinates: 34°32′N 69°07′E
- Country: Afghanistan
- Province: Kabul

Afshar (Dari: افشار, romanized: Afshār) is a hillside settlement situated in western Kabul, the capital of Afghanistan. Most of its population are of the Qizilbash and Hazara ethnic groups.

The neighbourhood was the site of the Afshar massacre of 1993.
