= Islamic and National Revolution Movement of Afghanistan =

Political party and former militant group in Afghanistan

Islamic Revolutionary Movement of Afghanistan
- د افغانستان اسلامي انقلابي غورځنګ
- Leaders: Mohammad Nabi Mohammadi (until 2002); Ahmad Nabi Muhammadi (2002–2015); Mawlawi Qalam u Din Mohmand (2015–present)
- Ideology: Islamism; Anti-communism; Deobandi
- Political position: Right-wing
- Part of: Afghan Mujahideen (1979–1989); Interim Afghan Government (1989–1992)
- Website: www.hiia.info

The Islamic Revolutionary Movement of Afghanistan (Pashto: د افغانستان اسلامي انقلابي غورځنګ; Da Afganistan Islami Inqilabi Ghurzang) is a traditionalist Islamist political party. It was once one of the biggest Afghan mujahideen factions fighting against Soviet forces during the Soviet–Afghan War. Mohammad Nabi Mohammadi was the leader of the group at the time. When the Taliban emerged in the 1990s, Mohammadi dissolved the group and urged its members to join the new movement.

== History ==
The movement was one of the seven Peshawar parties. As a mujahideen group, it operated in the southern and eastern Afghan provinces of Kandahar, Helmand, Uruzgan, Ghazni, Paktika, and Wardak. However, it was not as strong or influential a group as Gulbuddin Hekmatyar's Hezb-i-Islami or Ahmad Shah Massoud's forces. It became recognized as the second most important of the seven parties in 1981 (after Jamiat-i Islami), but support was eroded by 1984. The group lacked a clear political aim other than Afghan traditionalism and Islamism.

During the 1990s the group fell into decay. Initially it joined the government of Burhanuddin Rabbani, but in 1993 left and forbade its members from taking part in the ongoing battles. When the Taliban emerged, Mohammadi dissolved the group and urged its members to join it. Some of its members had international inspirations, going to Kuwait to fight against Ba'athist Iraq during the Gulf War. The movement was also weakened by the founding of the breakaway National and Islamic Prosperity Party of Afghanistan, formed by Maulawi Muhammad Osman Salekzada, which captured much of the HIIs following in northern Afghanistan.

After the death of its leader, Mohammed Nabi Mohamadi, in Pakistan, the leadership of the movement was taken over by his son Ahmad Nabi Muhammadi. Under its new leadership the name of the movement was changed to Islamic and National Revolution Movement of Afghanistan (Harakat-e Inqilab-e Islami wa Melli-ye Afghanistan). In April 2005, it joined the National Understanding Front of Afghanistan, a coalition of 12 opposition parties. The front did however not last long.

In 2015, the party named a new leader: Mawlawi Qalam U Din Mohmand. Harakat members created public attention when it held a gathering to commemorate the late Taliban founder, Mullah Omar (who was a Harakat member during the Soviet-Afghan War), provoking a wave of outrage. The party has been relaunched a few times, and in its latest interviews emphasised "peace" as the party's priority. A member of Harakat's ulema council asked the Taliban to leave the traitorous and hypocrite[ic]al country of Pakistan."
