= Islamic Dawah Organisation of Afghanistan =

Primarily Pashtun political party in Afghanistan

Islamic Dawah Organisation of Afghanistan د افغانستان د اسلامي دعوت سازمان
- Leader: Abdulrab Rasul Sayyaf
- Secretary: Maiwand Safa
- General Secretary: Maiwand Safa
- Founded: 2005
- Ideology: Wahhabism
- Political position: Right-wing

Islamic Union for the Liberation of Afghanistan
- د افغانستان د ازادۍ لپاره اسلامي اتحاد
- Leader: Abdulrab Rasul Sayyaf
- Dates active: Early 1980s–1989 (Part of Afghan Mujahideen); 1989–1992 (1st government as Interim); 1992–2001 (2nd government); 2001–present (as political party)
- Country: Afghanistan
- Ideology: Islamism; Anti-communism
- Part of: Afghan Mujahideen (1979–1989); Interim Afghan Government (1989–1992); Islamic State of Afghanistan (1992–2001); Northern Alliance (1996–2001)

The Islamic Dawah Organization of Afghanistan (Pashto: د افغانستان د اسلامي دعوت سازمان Da Afganistan Islami Da'wat Sazman) is a political party in Afghanistan led by Abdul Rasul Sayyaf. Founded in the early 1980s as the Islamic Union for the Liberation of Afghanistan, it was originally an attempt to bring unity amongst Islamist opposition forces in Afghanistan. However, the creation of the new umbrella organization effectively created a split and the organization became a political party of its own. The organization was part of the 'Peshawar Seven', the coalition of mujahedin forces supported by the United States, Pakistan and various Arab states of the Gulf in the war against the PDPA government, Soviet forces and Ba'athist Iraq. Through the financial aid received from Saudi sources, the organization was able to attract a considerable military following. Arab volunteers fought in the militia forces of the organisation.

== Afghan Civil War (1992–96) ==
After the ouster of the PDPA government in April 1992, Gulbuddin Hekmatyar initiated a bombardment campaign against the Islamic State of Afghanistan which had been established by the peace and power-sharing agreement Peshawar Accords. In addition, Saudi Arabia and Iran – as competitors for regional hegemony – supported Afghan militias hostile towards each other. According to Human Rights Watch, "Iran assisted the Shia Hazara Hezb-i Wahdat forces of Abdul Ali Mazari, as Iran attempted to maximize Wahdat's military power and influence." Saudi Arabia supported the Wahhabite Abdul Rasul Sayyaf and his Ittihad-i Islami faction. Conflict between the two militias soon escalated into a full-scale war. Both Ittihad and Wahdat engaged in large-scale kidnapping campaigns against civilians and combatants of the "other side". The Islamic State and International Committee of the Red Cross regularly tried to mediate between the two sides, but cease-fires commonly were broken in a matter of days. In early 1993, the Hezb-i Wahdat joined an alliance with Gulbuddin Hekmatyar starting to shell northern Kabul. On February 11, 1993, Ittihad forces took part in the Islamic State's military Afshar operation which had the objective of ending the bombardment on residential areas in northern Kabul conducted by Hezb-i Wahdat. After the military operation had ended and successfully forced Wahdat forces from the area, Ittihad forces started to escalate the situation by turning against the civilian population. During and after the operation 70 combatants and civilians were killed. After the operation Ittihad troops under the command of Abdul Rasul Sayyaf kidnapped up dozens of people, some of whom were released after ransoms were paid to Ittihad commanders, some escaped by counter-operations by Hizb-e-Wahdat.

In 2001, Ittihad's leader Abdul Rasul Sayyaf was suspected of being complicit in the assassination of anti-Taliban leader Ahmad Shah Massoud.

In 2005, the Ittihad organization was registered as a political party with the Ministry of Justice under its new name. Sayyaf and Ittihad are currently allied to the Karzai government. The party is strongest in the Paghman area and receives most of its support from Pashtuns. Ideologically, the party follows and advocates an Orthodox form of Islam.

== See also ==
- List of Islamic political parties
