= Abdulrab Rasul Sayyaf =

Afghan military commander and politician (born 1946)

Abdulrab Rasul Sayyaf عبدالرب رسول سیف
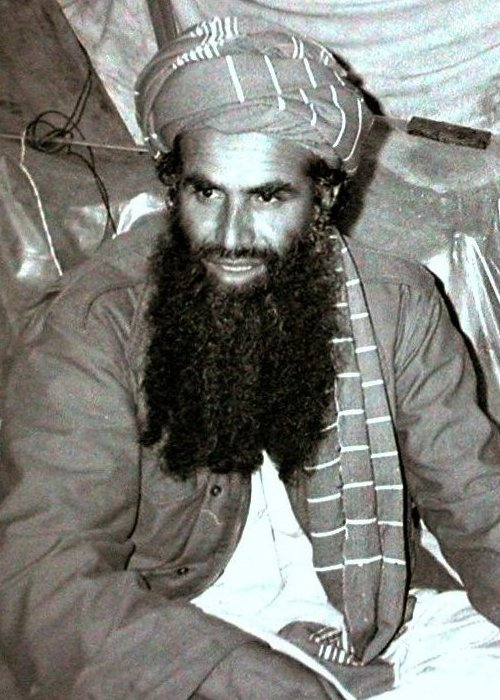
- Sayyaf in 1984
- Born: 1946 (age 79–80); Paghman, Kabul, Kingdom of Afghanistan
- Occupations: Politician, former Mujahideen leader
- Known for: Afghan Jihad; Opposition to the Taliban
- Political party: Islamic Dawah Organisation of Afghanistan

Abdulrab Rasul Sayyaf (Note: /ɑːbˈduːl rəˈsuːl saɪˈjɑːf/ ahb-DOOL ra-b rə-SOOL sy-YAHF; Pashto: عبدالرب رسول سیف) (born 1946) is an Afghan Pashtun politician and former military commander. He took part in the war against the Marxist–Leninist People's Democratic Party of Afghanistan (PDPA) government in the 1980s, leading the Afghan mujahideen faction Ittehad-al-Islami (Islamic Union).

Compared to other Afghan mujahideen leaders, Sayyaf was closely tied with international mujahideen from the Arab world. During the Soviet-Afghan War he had close relations with Saudi Arabia and helped mobilize Arab jihadist volunteers for the mujahideen forces.

Sayyaf was allied with the Rabbani government in the 1990s. After the rise of the Taliban militia, he joined the Northern Alliance in opposition of the Taliban, despite his close relationship with Saudi Arabia that supported the Taliban. In 2005 after the creation of the Islamic Republic of Afghanistan, Sayyaf's Islamic Union was converted into a political party and he was elected as a member of the Afghan Parliament, where he maintained political influence. Following the Taliban capture of Kabul in 2021, Sayyaf fled to exile in New Delhi, India.

== Early life ==
Abdulrab Rasul Sayyaf was born in 1946 in Paghman in the Kabul Province of the Kingdom of Afghanistan into a Pashtun family of Ghilzai tribe.

Sayyaf (سياف) is an Arabic word that means "swordsman." He is fluent in Arabic language and holds a degree in religion from Kabul University and a masters from the illustrious Al-Azhar University in Cairo, Egypt. He has been described as "a big, beefy man with fair skin and a thick gray beard." Sayyaf is reported to be approximately 6 ft 3 in (1.91 m) in height and weigh 250 lb (110 kg). "He usually wears a white skullcap or a large turban, and a traditional Afghan partug kameez, a tunic with loose pants." He was also noted for his photographic memory; Abdullah Anas, one of the leading Afghan Arabs, recalls in his memoirs that "once when the hugely influential Abu'l Hassan al-Nadawi, known as the Syed Qutb of India, was delivering a lecture at Kabul University, Sayyaf translated the whole lecture into Persian word for word without mistakes after the former had finished delivering the entire lecture."

Sayyaf was a member of the Afghan-based Ikhwan al-Muslimin, founded in 1969 by Gulbuddin Hekmatyar and Dr. Burhanuddin Rabbani and having strong links to the original and much larger Muslim Brotherhood in Egypt. Sayyaf was a professor at the Shariat (Islamic law) faculty of Kabul University until 1973, when he plotted with his group to overthrow President Mohammed Daoud Khan. The uprising attempt in July 1975, in Panjshir Valley, failed significantly and he was forced to flee to Pakistan but was arrested when he returned. However another account claims Sayyaf was not part of the plot but was merely arrested by the government for his ideology.

== As a warlord ==
=== Soviet war and Bin Laden friendship ===
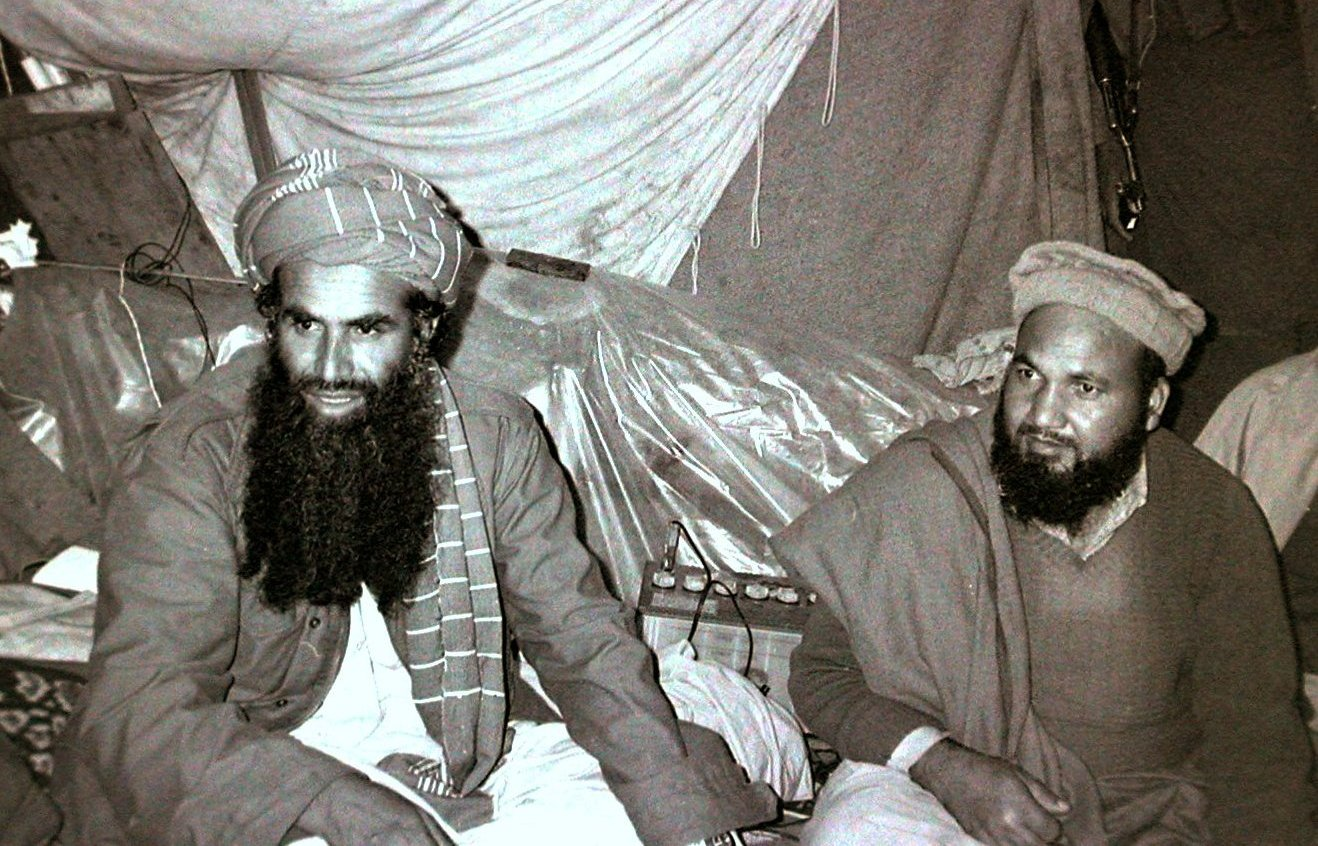
Sayyaf (left) as an Afghan Mujahid commander in 1984

Being imprisoned by the Communist People's Democratic Party of Afghanistan in April 1978, he was freed in controversial circumstances by General Secretary Hafizullah Amin, who, coincidentally, was Sayyaf's distant relative. Although he did not arrive in Peshawar until 1980, after the actual Soviet intervention, due to having been incarcerated, he was recognized by the Pakistanis as the leader of the Islamic Union for the Liberation of Afghanistan (Ittihad-i-Islami Baraye Azadi Afghanistan), a coalition of several parties fighting the Soviet and Afghan government forces. The Islamic Union soon imploded, and Sayyaf retained the name as the title of his own organization. After presenting his organization and the jihad to Arabs in Saudi Arabia, Sayyaf is thought to have been most responsible for internationalizing the Afghan jihad against the Soviets, and thus creating a vocal point of concerns to Muslims in the Middle East. Sayyaf further made a name change and growing his beard very long, which were symbols of his close relations with the royal Saudis and their Wahhabist tradition. The Saudi General Intelligence Presidency tried to coerce the leaders of the other mujahideen movements to accept Sayyaf as their leader. In 1980 Prince Turki bin Faisal invited the major mujahideen leaders to a conference in Taif and locked them in a jail until they agreed to accept Sayyaf's command, but they reneged on the agreement immediately after being freed.

Sayyaf fought against government forces and Soviet occupation forces in Afghanistan during the 1980s, and was generously financed, and apparently favoured, by Saudi Arabia, seemingly due to his close religious affinities with the Wahhabist Saudi Royal and religious establishment and his excellent command of the Arabic language. During the jihad against the Soviet Union and its Afghan allies, he formed a close relationship with Osama bin Laden. Together in the Jalalabad area they established a training camp network, later used by Al-Qaeda personnel, with bunkers and emplacements. In 1981, Sayyaf formed and headed the Ittihad-i-Islami Baraye Azadi Afghanistan, or Islamic Union for the Liberation of Afghanistan. In 1985, he founded a university in an Afghan refugee camp near Peshawar called Dawa'a al-Jihad (Call of Jihad), which has been described the "preeminent school for terrorism." Ramzi Ahmed Yousef, who masterminded the 1993 World Trade Center bombing, attended it.

Despite his growing wealth, he continued to live a spartan life, avoiding modern conveniences like mattresses and air conditioning; although he enjoyed a nightly game of tennis.

During the post-war period, Sayyaf retained his training camps, using them for militarily training and indoctrinating new recruits to fight in Islamic-backed conflicts such as Chechnya, Bosnia and Herzegovina. In the Southern Philippines, his name and example inspired the early leaders of the Abu Sayyaf group, who took the name Abu Sayyaf as a nom de guerre. Also, in these camps, Sayyaf trained and mentored the soon-to-be-infamous, Kuwaiti-born, future Al-Qaeda operative and senior commander and principle architect of the 9/11 attacks, Khalid Sheikh Mohammed, after being introduced by the latter's brother, Zahid, during the Afghan Jihad in 1987.

=== Battle of Kabul ===
After the forced withdrawal of Soviet forces in 1989, and the overthrow of the Mohammad Najibullah regime in 1992, Sayyaf's organization's human rights record became noticeably worse, underlined by their involvement in the infamous massacres and rampages in the Shia Hazara-majority Afshar district of Kabul in 1992-1993 during the Battle of Kabul. Sayyaf's faction was responsible for, "repeated human butchery", when his faction of Mujahideen turned on civilians and the Shia Hezb-i Wahdat group in west Kabul starting May 1992. Amnesty International reported that Sayyaf's forces rampaged through the neighborhood, slaughtering and raping inhabitants and burning homes. Sayyaf, who was allied with the de jure Kabul government of Burhanuddin Rabbani, did not deny the abductions of Hazara civilians, but merely accused the Hezb-i Wahdat militia of being an Iranian agent.

=== Opposition to the Taliban ===
Sayyaf claimed and claims he is a vituperative opponent of the Taliban movement, which is the reason he officially joined the Northern Alliance, despite his religious and ideological affinities with the Taliban and Al-Qaeda. Sayyaf was initially the only Pashtun leader in the Northern Alliance fighting against the Taliban. Sayyaf is rumored to have helped Arab suicide assassins of al-Qaeda to kill the Northern Alliance leader, Ahmad Shah Massoud. He is also rumored to have helped during their preparations, raising suspicion he was involved in killing Massoud. Sayyaf's forces participated in the Northern Alliance's capture of Kabul during the 2001 U.S. invasion of Afghanistan.

== Since 2001 ==
=== 2003 Constitutional Loya Jirga ===
In 2003, Sayyaf was elected as one of the 502 representatives at the Constitutional Loya Jirga in Kabul, chairing one of the working groups. Originally wanted Loya Jirga intended to divide the 502 delegates randomly among 10 working groups, but Sayyaf objected, suggesting delegates be divided among the groups to ensure equal distribution of professional expertise, provincial origin, gender and other criteria. "Those who know the constitution, the ulema [Islamic scholars], and the lawyers should be split into different groups so that the results of the discussion and debate will be positive, and closer to each other," said Sayyaf.

Abdul Sayyaf's influence in the convention was felt further when his ally Fazal Hadi Shinwari was appointed by Hamid Karzai as Chief Justice of the Supreme Court, in violation of the constitution, as Fazal was over the age limit and trained only in religious, not secular, law. Shinwari packed the Supreme Court with sympathetic mullahs, called for Taliban-style punishments and renewed the Taliban-era Ministry for the Promotion of Virtue and Prevention of Vice, which was renamed the Ministry of Haj and Religious Affairs.

=== Member of parliament ===
He launched his newly converted Islamic Dawah Organisation of Afghanistan party in 2005 and was elected as a member of parliament that same year in parliamentary elections. Later in 2005 he was running for Speaker of the Lower House, where he surprisingly gained the support of Muhammad Mohaqiq, an ethnic Hazara and former member of the Hazara militia that fought against Sayyaf's militia in west Kabul in the 1990s. Although Sayyaf lost the Speaker election to Yunus Qanuni, Mohaqiq's support helped to fix the relationship between Sayyaf and Hazaras.

During his years as MP and in the 2010s, Sayyaf has become an influential elderly lawmaker, presenting himself as a "voice of wisdom". He was noted as being having the "greatest authority" to speak on religious matters. Sayyaf was a loyal supporter of the incumbent president, Hamid Karzai. However he controversially supported a bill granting amnesty for former mujahideen warlords accused of crimes in the past.

On the first anniversary of Burhanuddin Rabbani's assassination, Sayyaf spoke at a gathering saying that the actions of suicide bombers are against Islam and unforgivable by God.

Sayyaf announced himself as a candidate for the President of Afghanistan in the 2014 election, campaigning in fighting against corruption and in favor of women's rights. He received 7.04% of the vote in the first round, as the candidate for the aforementioned Islamic Dawah Organisation of Afghanistan, and winning Kandahar Province.

In 2015, Sayyaf strongly criticized the Taliban in a speech, calling their actions "un-Islamic" and called the group "slaves of Pakistan" – his remarks were widely hailed by different Afghan social segments. On proposed peace talks with the Taliban in 2018, Sayyaf commented that peace is the "order of Allah".

In April 2019, Sayyaf was chosen by President Ghani to chair the four-day loya jirga for peace efforts, attended by 3,200 representatives in Kabul. He called for unity in his opening remarks. In his main speech, Sayyaf stressed the importance of women's rights, saying "The Prophet of Islam is also a descendant of a woman", and called defending women a "religious principle". This countered reports from the western press that he is a hardliner opposed to women's rights.

=== 2021- present ===
After the fall of Kabul on August 15, 2021, Sayyaf refused to pledge allegiance and was rumored to have fled to India. In October, there were unconfirmed reports that he is part of a planned government in exile in Tajikistan alongside other exiled politicians. This resistance movement was declared a few days later, alongside Atta Muhammad Nur. It was later revealed that Sayyaf had been based in New Delhi, India, after fleeing the Taliban's take over of Afghanistan.

On 25 February 2025, it was reported that Sayyaf travelled to Iran for a medical visit. He also had a meeting with the Iranian officials.
