= Ahmad Shah Massoud =

Afghan military leader (1953–2001)

- احمد شاه مسعود
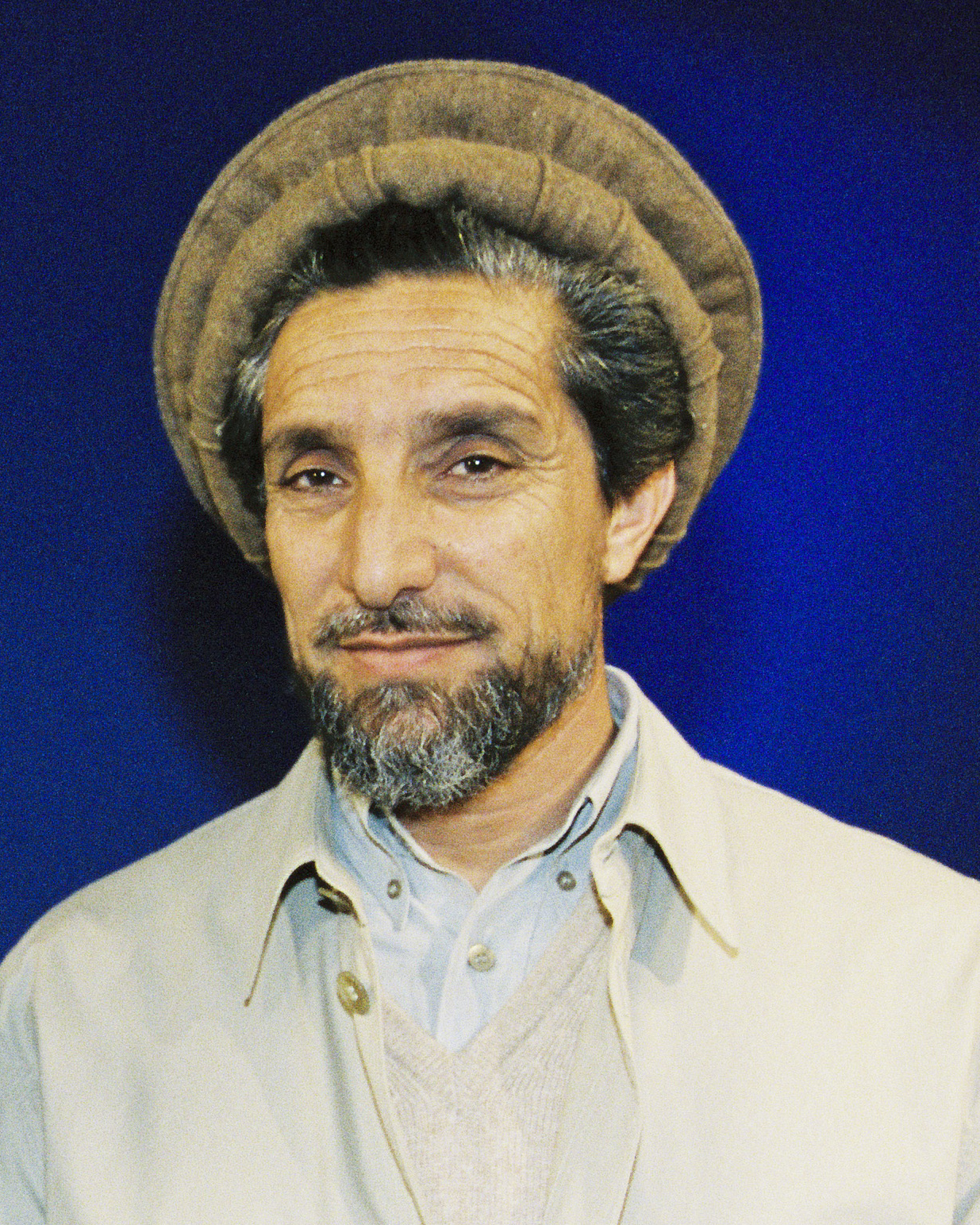
- Massoud in 2001

Minister of Defense of Afghanistan
- In office 28 April 1992 – 9 September 2001 (In opposition to the Taliban from 27 September 1996)
- President: Burhanuddin Rabbani
- Preceded by: Aslam Watanjar
- Succeeded by: Muhammad Fahim

Personal details
- Born: c. 1953 Bazarak, Kingdom of Afghanistan
- Died: 9 September 2001 (aged 47–48) Takhar Province, Islamic State of Afghanistan
- Cause of death: Assassination
- Party: Jamiat-e Islami
- Height: 1.85 m (6 ft 1 in)
- Spouse: Sediqa Massoud
- Children: 6, including Ahmad
- Parent: Dost Muhammad Khan
- Awards: National Hero of Afghanistan; Order of Ismoili Somoni
- Nickname: Lion of Panjshir

Military service
- Branch/service: Jamiat-e Islami / Shura-e Nazar (part of the Afghan mujahideen); Afghan Armed Forces; United Islamic Front
- Years of service: 1975–2001
- Rank: General
- Commands: Mujahideen commander during the Soviet–Afghan War; Commander of the United Islamic Front
- Battles/wars: 1975 Panjshir Valley uprising; Soviet–Afghan War; Panjshir offensives; Panjshir Front; First Panjshir Offensive; Second Panjshir Offensive; Operation Arrow; Marmoul offensives; Soviet withdrawal from Afghanistan; Operation Typhoon (Panjshir); First Afghan Civil War; Second Afghan Civil War; Afshar Operation; Third Afghan Civil War X

Ahmad Shah Massoud (Note: Dari: احمد شاه مسعود, romanized: Aḥmad Shāh Masʿūd [ʔahˈmæd ʃɑːh masʔˈuːd]) (c. 1953 – 9 September 2001) was an Afghan military leader and politician. Known as the "Lion of Panjshir", he was the foremost commander of the Afghan mujahideen against Soviet occupation during the Soviet–Afghan War from 1979 to 1989. Later, in the 1990s, he led the government's military wing against rival militias, and actively fought against the Taliban and their allies, from the time the regime rose to power in 1996, and until his assassination in 2001.

Massoud came from a Tajik Sunni Muslim background in the Panjshir Valley in northern Afghanistan. He began studying engineering at Polytechnical University of Kabul in the 1970s, where he developed Islamist and anti-communist views. He joined the Jamiat-i Islami of Burhanuddin Rabbani and, in 1975, participated in a failed uprising against President Daoud Khan's government. During the Soviet–Afghan War, he successfully resisted the Soviets from taking the Panjshir Valley. In 1992, he signed the Peshawar Accord, a peace and power-sharing agreement, in the post-communist Islamic State of Afghanistan. He was appointed the Minister of Defense as well as the government's main military commander. The accord was opposed by Gulbuddin Hekmatyar and other warlords, who attacked Kabul and initiated the Second Afghan Civil War (1992–1996).

Following the rise of the Taliban in 1996, Massoud, who rejected the group's extremist interpretation of Islam, returned to armed opposition. He became the military leader of the Northern Alliance, which by 2000 controlled only 5–10% of the country. In 2001, he visited Europe and urged European Parliament leaders for humanitarian aid to combat the Afghan people's conditions under the Taliban. On September 9, 2001, Massoud was killed in a suicide bombing by two al-Qaeda assassins. Two days later, al-Qaeda operatives carried out the September 11 attacks in the United States. Within weeks, American and NATO forces invaded Afghanistan, allying with the Northern Alliance and toppling the Taliban from power. By December 2001, the coalition had secured control over the country.

Regarded as one of the most influential guerrilla leaders in modern history, Massoud became an icon of several anti-imperialist movements and gained the status of a cult of personality. He was posthumously named the national hero of Afghanistan by the order of President Hamid Karzai after the Taliban were ousted from power in 2001. The date of Massoud's death, 9 September, was observed as "Martyrs' Day" under the Islamic Republic of Afghanistan. His son Ahmad Massoud is leading the National Resistance Front (NRF) against the Taliban.

== Early life ==
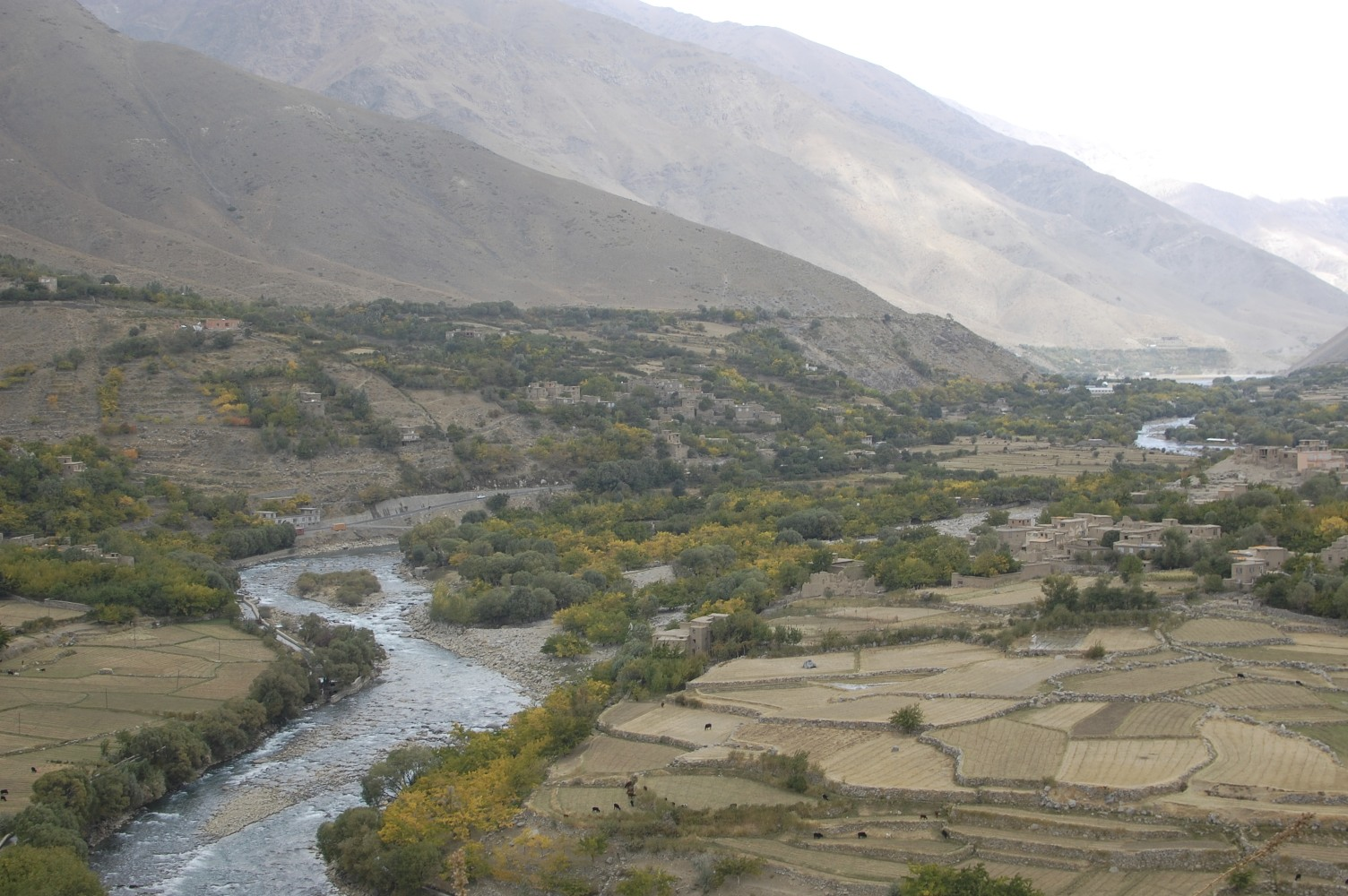
View of Panjshir Valley from Massoud's Tomb

Ahmad Shah Massoud was born in c. 1953 in the small village of Jangalak, Bazarak in the Panjshir Valley to an ethnic Tajik family. He was named 'Ahmad Shah' after Ahmad Shah Durrani (r. 1747–1772), founder of the Durrani Empire, later taking the name 'Massoud' as a nom de guerre in 1974 when he joined the resistance movement against the forces of President Daoud Khan. Massoud's father, Dost Mohammad Khan, was a colonel in the Royal Afghan Army; his mother, Bibi Khorshid has been described as a "modern-minded" woman who taught herself to read and write determined to educate her daughters no less than her sons.

Moving along with his father's postings, the adolescent Massoud attended primary school in Afghanistan's western city of Herat before his father was dispatched to Kabul. There, Massoud was sent to the Franco-Afghan Lycée Esteqlal (lit. Independence High School) where he attained his proficiency in French. Massoud's experience at Lycée would be formative and, as he would later remark, was the happiest period of his life. At Lycée his classes were taught by French and Afghan tutors educated in France and the students donned Western jackets, neckties, trousers, scarves, and stockings. Although his knowledge of the French language would earn him greater affinity among French journalists and politicians, later ultraconservative Islamist opponents such as Gulbuddin Hekmatyar and the Taliban would derogatorily dub him "the Frenchman" or "the Parisian" suggestive of his sympathies to Western culture.

While at the Lycée, Massoud was described as an intellectually gifted student, hardworking, religiously devout, and mature for his age with a particular interest in ethics, politics, universal justice. Friends and family recall an instance where Massoud, returning from school, came to the defense of a younger boy leaving the three bullies knocked-out on the pavement. More formatively, Massoud followed closely reports of the 1967 Six-Day War and the defiant statements of Arab leaders like Egyptian President Gamal Abdel Nasser. He later told researcher Peter DeNeufville that, at fourteen, the war left him determined to be a soldier and gave him a new regard for pan-Islamism after hearing the stories told by Jordanian, Egyptian, and Syrian soldiers defending their homelands. Massoud refused repeated suggestions to apply for a scholarship to study in France expressing his desire to remain in Afghanistan and apply to the nation's military academy in Kabul.

Despite the objections of his father and eldest brother, Massoud enrolled at Kabul Polytechnic Institute, then Kabul University's newest and most prestigious addition founded, financed, and operated by the Soviet Union. Massoud studied engineering and architecture but never attempted to learn Russian. There he found interest in politics, political Islam, and anti-communism which often put him and his pious peers at odds with communist-inspired students. According to Soviet intelligence reports on Massoud, in 1974–1975, he was trained in guerilla warfare tactics in Lebanon and Egypt where he took part in combat operations and terrorist attacks with armed Palestinian resistance groups such as the Palestinian Liberation Organization (PLO).

== 1975 rebellion in Panjshir ==
In 1973, former prime minister Daoud Khan was brought to power in a coup backed by the People's Democratic Party of Afghanistan, and the Republic of Afghanistan was established. These developments gave rise to an Islamist movement opposed to the increasing communist and Soviet influence over Afghanistan. During that time, while studying at Kabul University, Massoud became involved with the Muslim Youth (Sazman-i Jawanan-i Musulman), the student branch of the Jamiat-e Islami (Islamic Society), whose chairman then was Professor Burhanuddin Rabbani. Kabul University was a center for political debate and activism during that time.

Infuriated by the arrogance of his communist peers and Russian professors, a physical altercation between Massoud and his Russian professor led Massoud to walk out of the university, and shortly after, Kabul. Two days later, Massoud and a number of fellow militant students traveled to Pakistan where, goaded by another trainee of the Pakistani Inter-Services Intelligence (ISI), Gulbaddin Hekmatyar, Massoud agreed to take part in a coup against Daoud Khan with his forces rising up in the Panjshir and Hekmatyar's elsewhere. In July 1975, Massoud, with help from the ISI, led the first rebellion of Panjshir residents against the government of Daoud Khan. While the uprising in the Panjshir saw initial success, even taking the military garrison in Rokha, the promised support from Kabul never came and the rebellion was suppressed by Khan's forces sending Massoud back into Pakistan (after a day hiding in Jangalak) where he would attend a secret, paramilitary ISI training center in Cherat. Dissatisfied, Massoud left the center and returned to Peshawar where he committed himself to personal military studies. Massoud read Mao Tse-tung's writings on the Long March, of Che Guevara's career, the memoirs of General de Gaulle, General Võ Nguyên Giáp, Sun Tzu's Art of War, and an unnamed handbook on counterterrorism by an American general which Massoud called "the most instructive of all".

After this failure, a "profound and long-lasting schism" within the Islamist movement began to emerge. The Islamic Society split between supporters of the more moderate forces around Massoud and Rabbani, who led the Jamiat-i Islami, and more radical Islamist elements surrounding Gulbuddin Hekmatyar, who founded the Hezb-i Islami. The conflict reached such a point that Hekmatyar supposedly tried to kill Massoud, then 22 years old.

== Resistance against communism ==
=== Resistance against the PDPA (1978) ===
The government of Daoud Khan tried to scale back the communist People's Democratic Party of Afghanistan's influence, dismissing PDPA members from their government posts, appointing conservatives to replace them, and finally dissolved the PDPA, with the arrests of senior party members. On 27 April 1978, the PDPA and military units loyal to it killed Daoud Khan, his immediate family, and bodyguards in a violent coup, and seized control of the capital Kabul declaring the new Democratic Republic of Afghanistan (DRA). The new communist government, led by a revolutionary council, did not enjoy the support of the masses. It implemented a doctrine hostile to political dissent, whether inside or outside the party. The PDPA started reforms along Marxist–Leninist and Soviet lines. The reforms and the PDPA's affinity to the Soviet Union were met with strong resistance by the population, especially as the government attempted to enforce its Marxist policies by arresting or executing those who resisted. Between 50,000 and 100,000 people were estimated to have been arrested and killed by communist troops in the countryside alone. Due to the repression, large parts of the country, especially the rural areas, organized into open revolt against the PDPA government.

With religious elders declaring a jihad against the government, in May 1979 Massoud prepared in Peshawar to oppose the new communist government in Panjshir. Along with twenty-four of his friends, Massoud took a bus to Bajaur and, with arms-smuggling Pashtun tribesmen, marched on foot into the Panjshir Valley. Massoud's group seized control over a number of government outposts in the Valley, entered the Shomali Plain to capture Gulbahar, and cut off the Salang Highway, the main supply route between Kabul and the Soviet border raising alarm in both Kabul and Moscow which brought upon Massoud and his group a government counterattack.

Believing that an uprising against the Soviet-backed communists would be supported by the people, Massoud, on 6 July 1979, started an insurrection in the Panjshir, which initially failed. Massoud decided to avoid conventional confrontation with the larger government forces and to wage a guerrilla war. He subsequently took full control of Panjshir, pushing out Afghan communist troops. Oliver Roy writes that in the following period, Massoud's "personal prestige and the efficiency of his military organization persuaded many local commanders to come and learn from him."

=== Resistance against the Soviet Union (1979–1989) ===
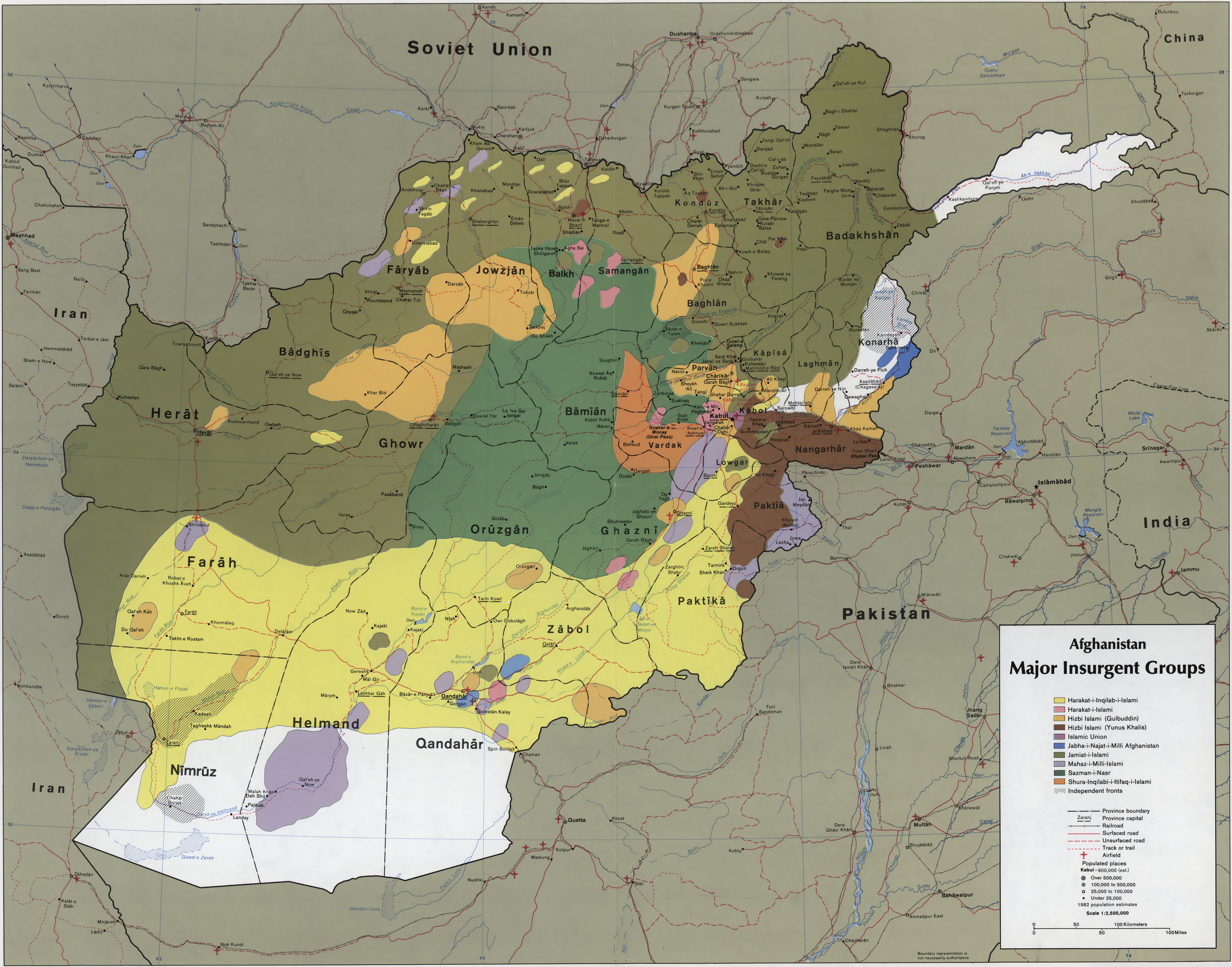
Major resistance forces against the Soviets 1985; Army-green depicts locations of Jamiat-i Islami. Shura-e Nazar (Massoud's alliance) comprised many Jamiat positions but also those of other groups.

Following the 1979 Soviet invasion and occupation of Afghanistan, Massoud devised a strategic plan for expelling the invaders and overthrowing the communist regime. The first task was to establish a popularly based resistance force that had the loyalty of the people. The second phase was "active defense" of the Panjshir stronghold, while carrying out asymmetric warfare. In the third phase, the "strategic offensive", Massoud's forces would gain control of large parts of Northern Afghanistan. The fourth phase was the "general application" of Massoud's principles to the whole country, and the defeat of the Afghan communist government.

Massoud's mujahideen attacked the occupying Soviet forces, ambushing Soviet and Afghan communist convoys travelling through the Salang Pass, and causing fuel shortages in Kabul. The Soviets mounted a series of offensives against the Panjshir. Between 1980 and 1985, these offensives were conducted twice a year. Despite engaging more men and hardware on each occasion, the Soviets were unable to defeat Massoud's forces. In 1982, the Soviets began deploying major combat units in the Panjshir, numbering up to 30,000 men. Massoud pulled his troops back into subsidiary valleys, where they occupied fortified positions. When the Soviet columns advanced onto these positions, they fell into ambushes. When the Soviets withdrew, Afghan army garrisons took over their positions. Massoud and his mujahideen forces attacked and recaptured them one by one.

In 1983, the Soviets offered Massoud a temporary truce, which he accepted in order to rebuild his own forces and give the civilian population a break from Soviet attacks. He put the respite to good use. In this time he created the Shura-e Nazar (Supervisory Council), which subsequently united 130 commanders from 12 Afghan provinces in their fight against the Soviet army. This council existed outside the Peshawar parties, which were prone to internecine rivalry and bickering, and served to smooth out differences between resistance groups, due to political and ethnic divisions. It was the predecessor of what could have become a unified Islamic Afghan army.

Relations with the party headquarters in Peshawar were often strained, as Rabbani insisted on giving Massoud no more weapons and supplies than to other Jamiat commanders, even those who did little fighting. To compensate for this deficiency, Massoud relied on revenues drawn from exports of emeralds and lapis lazuli, that are traditionally exploited in Northern Afghanistan.

Regarding infighting among different mujahideen factions, following a Soviet truce, Massoud said in an interview:

Hezb-i Islami men are like cancer, that is why one has to treat the cancer first.

Britain's MI6 having activated long-established networks of contacts in Pakistan were able to support Massoud, and soon became their key ally. MI6 sent an annual mission of two of their officers as well as military instructors to Massoud and his fighters. They also gave supplies to Massoud which included sniper rifles with silencers and mortars. As well as training Massoud's junior commanders, MI6 team's most important contribution was help with organisation and communication via radio equipment which was highly useful for Massoud to coordinate his forces and be warned of any impending Soviet attacks. The United States provided him with comparatively less support than other factions. Part of the reason was that it permitted its funding and arms distribution to be administered by Pakistan, which favored the rival mujahideen leader Gulbuddin Hekmatyar. In an interview, Massoud said, "We thought the CIA knew everything. But they didn't. They supported some bad people [meaning Hekmatyar]." Primary advocates for supporting Massoud were the US State Department's Edmund McWilliams and Peter Tomsen, who were on the ground in Afghanistan and Pakistan. Others included two Heritage Foundation foreign policy analysts, Michael Johns and James A. Phillips, both of whom championed Massoud as the Afghan resistance leader most worthy of U.S. support under the Reagan Doctrine. Thousands of foreign Islamic volunteers entered Afghanistan to fight with the mujahideen against the Soviet troops.

To organize support for the mujahideen, Massoud established an administrative system that enforced law and order (nazm) in areas under his control. The Panjshir was divided into 22 bases (qarargah) governed by a military commander and a civilian administrator, and each had a judge, a prosecutor and a public defender. Massoud's policies were implemented by different committees: an economic committee was charged with funding the war effort. The health committee provided health services, assisted by volunteers from foreign humanitarian non-governmental organizations, such as Aide médicale internationale. An education committee was charged with the training of the military and administrative cadre. A culture committee and a judiciary committee were also created.

This expansion prompted Babrak Karmal to demand that the Red Army resume their offensives, in order to crush the Panjshir groups. Massoud received warning of the attack through Britain's GCHQ intelligence and he evacuated all 130,000 inhabitants from the valley into the Hindukush mountains, leaving the Soviet bombings to fall on empty ground and the Soviet battalions to face the mountains.

With the defeat of the Soviet-Afghan attacks, Massoud carried out the next phase of his strategic plan, expanding the resistance movement and liberating the northern provinces of Afghanistan. In August 1986, he captured Farkhar in Takhar Province. In November 1986, his forces overran the headquarters of the government's 20th division at Nahrin in Baghlan Province, scoring an important victory for the resistance. This expansion was also carried out through diplomatic means, as more mujahideen commanders were persuaded to adopt the Panjshir military system.

Despite almost constant attacks by the Red Army and the Afghan army, Massoud increased his military strength. Starting in 1980 with a force of less than 1,000 ill-equipped guerrillas, the Panjshir valley mujahideen grew to a 5,000-strong force by 1984. After expanding his influence outside the valley, Massoud increased his resistance forces to 13,000 fighters by 1989. The junior commanders were trained by Britain's SAS as well as private military contractors, some being sent as far as Oman and even SAS training grounds in the Scottish Highlands. These forces were divided into different types of units: the locals (mahalli) were tasked with static defense of villages and fortified positions. The best of the mahalli were formed into units called grup-i zarbati (shock troops), semi-mobile groups that acted as reserve forces for the defense of several strongholds. A different type of unit was the mobile group (grup-i-mutaharek), a lightly equipped commando-like formation numbering 33 men, whose mission was to carry out hit-and-run attacks outside the Panjshir, sometimes as far as 100 km from their base. These men were professional soldiers, well-paid and trained, and, from 1983 on, they provided an effective strike force against government outposts. Uniquely among the mujahideen, these groups wore uniforms, and their use of the pakul made this headwear emblematic of the Afghan resistance.

Massoud's military organization was an effective compromise between the traditional Afghan method of warfare and the modern principles of guerrilla warfare which he had learned from the works of Mao Zedong and Che Guevara. His forces were considered the most effective of all the various Afghan resistance movements.

The Soviet army and the Afghan communist army were mainly defeated by Massoud and his mujahideen in numerous small engagements between 1984 and 1988. After describing the Soviet Union's military engagement in Afghanistan as "a bleeding wound" in 1986, Soviet General Secretary Mikhail Gorbachev began a withdrawal of Soviet troops from the nation in May 1988. On February 15, 1989, in what was depicted as an improbable victory for the mujahideen, the last Soviet soldier left the nation.

=== Fall of the Afghan communist regime (1992) ===
After the departure of Soviet troops in 1989, the People's Democratic Party of Afghanistan regime, then headed by Mohammad Najibullah, held its own against the mujahideen. Backed by a massive influx of weapons from the Soviet Union, the Afghan armed forces reached a level of performance they had never reached under direct Soviet tutelage. They maintained control over all of Afghanistan's major cities. During late 1990, helped by hundreds of mujahideen forces, Massoud targeted the Tajik Supreme Soviet, trying to oust communism from the neighboring Tajikistan to further destabilize the dying Soviet Union, which would also impact the Afghan government. At that time, as per Asad Durrani, the director-general of the ISI during this period, Massoud's base camp was in Garam Chashma, in Pakistan. By 1992, after the collapse of the Soviet Union, the Afghan regime eventually began to crumble. Food and fuel shortages undermined the capacities of the government's army, and a resurgence of factionalism split the regime between Khalq and Parcham supporters.

A few days after Najibullah had lost control of the nation, his army commanders and governors arranged to turn over authority to resistance commanders and local warlords throughout the country. Joint councils (shuras) were immediately established for local government, in which civil and military officials of the former government were usually included. In many cases, prior arrangements for transferring regional and local authority had been made between foes.

Collusions between military leaders quickly brought down the Kabul government. In mid-January 1992, within three weeks of the demise of the Soviet Union, Massoud was aware of conflict within the government's northern command. General Abdul Momim, in charge of the Hairatan border crossing at the northern end of Kabul's supply highway, and other non-Pashtun generals based in Mazar-i-Sharif, feared removal by Najibullah and replacement by Pashtun officers. When the generals rebelled, Abdul Rashid Dostum, who held general rank as head of the Jowzjani militia, also based in Mazar-i-Sharif, took over.

He and Massoud reached a political agreement, together with another major militia leader, Sayyed Mansour, of the Ismaili community based in Baghlan Province. These northern allies consolidated their position in Mazar-i-Sharif on March 21. Their coalition covered nine provinces in the north and northeast. As turmoil developed within the government in Kabul, no government force stood between the northern allies and the major air force base at Bagram, some seventy kilometers north of Kabul. By mid-April 1992, the Afghan air force command at Bagram had capitulated to Massoud. On March 18, 1992, Najibullah decided to resign. On April 17, as his government fell, he tried to escape but was stopped at Kabul Airport by Dostum's forces. He took refuge at the United Nations mission, where he remained unharmed until 1996, while Massoud controlled the area surrounding the mission.

Senior communist generals and officials of the Najibullah administration acted as a transitional authority to transfer power to Ahmad Shah Massoud's alliance. The Kabul interim authority invited Massoud to enter Kabul as the new Head of State, but he held back. Massoud ordered his forces, positioned to the north of Kabul, not to enter the capital until a political solution was in place. He called on all the senior Afghan party leaders, many then based in exile in Peshawar, to work out a political settlement acceptable to all sides and parties.

== War in Afghanistan (1992–2001) ==
=== War in Kabul and other parts of the country (1992–1996) ===
==== Peace and power-sharing agreement (1992) ====
With United Nations support, most Afghan political parties decided to appoint a legitimate national government to succeed communist rule, through an elite settlement. While the external Afghan party leaders were residing in Peshawar, the military situation around Kabul involving the internal commanders was tense. A 1991 UN peace process brought about some negotiations, but the attempted elite settlement did not develop. In April 1992, resistance leaders in Peshawar tried to negotiate a settlement. Massoud supported the Peshawar process of establishing a broad coalition government inclusive of all resistance parties, but Hekmatyar sought to become the sole ruler of Afghanistan, stating, "In our country coalition government is impossible because, this way or another, it is going to be weak and incapable of stabilizing the situation in Afghanistan."

Massoud wrote:

All the parties had participated in the war, in jihad in Afghanistan, so they had to have their share in the government, and in the formation of the government. Afghanistan is made up of different nationalities. We were worried about a national conflict between different tribes and different nationalities. In order to give everybody their own rights and also to avoid bloodshed in Kabul, we left the word to the parties so they should decide about the country as a whole. We talked about it for a temporary stage and then after that the ground should be prepared for a general election.

A recorded radio communication between the two leaders showed the divide as Massoud asked Hekmatyar:

The Kabul regime is ready to surrender, so instead of the fighting we should gather. ... The leaders are meeting in Peshawar. ... The troops should not enter Kabul, they should enter later on as part of the government.

Hekmatyar's response:

We will march into Kabul with our naked sword. No one can stop us. ... Why should we meet the leaders?"

Massoud answered:

"It seems to me that you don't want to join the leaders in Peshawar nor stop your threat, and you are planning to enter Kabul ... in that case I must defend the people.

At that point Osama bin Laden, trying to mediate, urged Hekmatyar to "go back with your brothers" and to accept a compromise. Bin Laden reportedly "hated Ahmad Shah Massoud". Bin Laden was involved in ideological and personal disputes with Massoud, and had sided with Gulbuddin Hekmatyar against Massoud in the inner-Afghan conflict since the late 1980s. However, Hekmatyar refused to accept a compromise, confident that he would be able to gain sole power in Afghanistan.

On April 24, 1992, the leaders in Peshawar agreed on and signed the Peshawar Accord, establishing the post-communist Islamic State of Afghanistan – which was a stillborn 'state' with a paralyzed 'government' right from its inception, until its final succumbing in September 1996. The creation of the Islamic State was welcomed though by the General Assembly of the United Nations and the Islamic State of Afghanistan was recognized as the legitimate entity representing Afghanistan until June 2002, when its successor, the Islamic Republic of Afghanistan, was established under the interim government of Hamid Karzai. Under the 1992 Peshawar Accord, the Defense Ministry was given to Massoud while the Prime Ministership was given to Hekmatyar. Hekmatyar refused to sign. With the exception of Hekmatyar's Hezb-e Islami, all of the other Peshawar resistance parties were unified under this peace and power-sharing accord in April 1992.

==== Escalating war over Kabul (1992) ====
Although repeatedly offered the position of prime minister, Gulbuddin Hekmatyar refused to recognize the peace and power-sharing agreement. His Hezb-e Islami militia initiated a massive bombardment campaign against the Islamic State and the capital city Kabul. Gulbuddin Hekmatyar received operational, financial and military support from neighboring Pakistan. The Director of the Centre for Arab and Islamic Studies at the Australian National University, Amin Saikal, writes in Modern Afghanistan: A History of Struggle and Survival that without Pakistan's support, Hekmatyar "would not have been able to target and destroy half of Kabul." Saikal states that Pakistan wanted to install a favorable regime under Hekmatyar in Kabul so that it could use Afghan territory for access to Central Asia.

Hekmatyar's rocket bombardments and the parallel escalation of violent conflict between two militias, Ittihad and Wahdat, which had entered some suburbs of Kabul, led to a breakdown in law and order. Shia Iran and Sunni Wahabbi Saudi Arabia, as competitors for regional hegemony, encouraged conflict between the Ittihad and Wahdat factions. On the one side was the Shia Hazara Hezb-i Wahdat of Abdul Ali Mazari and on the other side, the Sunni Pashtun Ittihad-i Islami of Abdul Rasul Sayyaf.

According to Human Rights Watch, Iran was strongly supporting the Hezb-i Wahdat forces, with Iranian intelligence officials providing direct orders, while Saudi Arabia supported Sayyaf and his Ittihad-i Islami faction to maximize Wahhabi influence. Kabul descended into lawlessness and chaos, as described in reports by Human Rights Watch and the Afghanistan Justice Project. Massoud's Jamiat commanders, the interim government, and the International Committee of the Red Cross (ICRC) repeatedly tried to negotiate ceasefires, which broke down in only a few days. Another militia, the Junbish-i Milli of former communist general Abdul Rashid Dostum, was backed by Uzbekistan. Uzbek president Islam Karimov was keen to see Dostum controlling as much of Afghanistan as possible, especially in the north. Dostum repeatedly changed allegiances.

The Afghanistan Justice Project (AJP) says, that "while [Hekmatyar's anti-government] Hizb-i Islami is frequently named as foremost among the factions responsible for the deaths and destruction in the bombardment of Kabul, it was not the only perpetrator of these violations." According to the AJP, "the scale of the bombardment and kinds of weapons used represented disproportionate use of force" in a capital city with primarily residential areas by all the factions involved – including the government forces. Crimes were committed by individuals within the different armed factions. Gulbuddin Hekmatyar released 10,000 dangerous criminals from the main prisons into the streets of Kabul to destabilize the city and cut off Kabul from water, food and energy supplies. The Iran-controlled Wahdat of Abdul Ali Mazari, as well as the Ittihad of Abdul Rasul Sayyaf supported by Saudi Arabia, targeted civilians of the 'opposite side' in systematic atrocities. Abdul Rashid Dostum allowed crimes as a perceived payment for his troops.

==== Afshar operation (February 1993) ====
"The major criticism of Massoud's human rights record" is the escalation of the Afshar military operation in 1993. A report by the Afghanistan Justice Project describes Massoud as failing to prevent atrocities carried out by his forces and those of their factional ally, Ittihad-i Islami, against civilians on taking the suburb of Afshar during a military operation against an anti-state militia allied to Gulbuddin Hekmatyar. They shelled residential areas in the capital city in February 1993. Critics said that Massoud should have foreseen these problems. A meeting convened by Massoud on the next day ordered a halt to killing and looting, but it failed to stop abuses. Human Rights Watch, in a report based largely on the material collected by the Afghanistan Justice Project, concurs that Massoud's Jamiat forces bear a share of the responsibility for human rights abuses throughout the war, including the indiscriminate targeting of civilians in Afshar, and that Massoud was personally implicated in some of these abuses. Roy Gutman has argued that the witness reports about Afshar cited in the AJP report implicated only the Ittihad forces, and that these had not been under Massoud's direct command.

Anthony Davis, who studied and observed Massoud's forces from 1981 to 2001, reported that during the observed period, there was "no pattern of repeated killings of enemy civilians or military prisoners" by Massoud's forces. Edward Girardet, who covered Afghanistan for over three decades, was also in Kabul during the war. He states that while Massoud was able to control most of his commanders well during the anti-Soviet and anti-Taliban resistance, he was not able to control every commander in Kabul. According to this and similar testimonies, this was due to a breakdown of law and order in Kabul and a war on multiple fronts, which they say, Massoud personally had done all in his power to prevent:

Massoud was always talking to his people about not behaving badly; he told them that they were accountable to their God. But because of the rocket attacks on the city the number of troops had to be increased, so there were ten or twelve thousand troops from other sources that came in ... He [Massoud] not only did not order any [crimes], but he was deeply distressed by them. I remember once ... Massoud commented that some commanders were behaving badly, and said that he was trying to bring them to justice ...

— Eng. Mohammad Eshaq, in Massoud (Webster University Press, 2009)

==== Further war over Kabul (March–December 1993) ====
In 1993, Massoud created the Cooperative Mohammad Ghazali Culture Foundation (Bonyad-e Farhangi wa Ta'wani Mohammad-e Ghazali) to further humanitarian assistance and politically independent Afghan culture. The Ghazali Foundation provided free medical services during some days of the week to residents of Kabul who were unable to pay for medical treatment. The Ghazali Foundation's department for distribution of auxiliary goods was the first partner of the Red Cross. The Ghazali Foundation's department of family consultation was a free advisory board, which was accessible seven days a week for the indigent. Although Massoud was responsible for the financing of the foundation, he did not interfere with its cultural work. A council led the foundation and a jury, consisting of impartial university lecturers, decided on the works of artists. The Ghazali foundation enabled Afghan artists to exhibit their works at different places in Kabul, and numerous artists and authors were honoured for their works; some of them neither proponents of Massoud nor the Islamic State government.

In March 1993, Massoud resigned his government position in exchange for peace, as requested by Hekmatyar, who considered him as a personal rival. According to the Islamabad Accord, Burhanuddin Rabbani, belonging to the same party as Massoud, remained president, while Gulbuddin Hekmatyar took the long-offered position of prime minister. Two days after the Islamabad Accord went into effect, his allies in Hezb-e Wahdat renewed rocket attacks in Kabul.

Both the Wahhabi Pashtun Ittehad-i Islami of Abdul Rasul Sayyaf backed by Saudi Arabia and the Shia Hazara Hezb-e Wahdat supported by Iran remained involved in heavy fighting against each other. Hekmatyar was afraid to enter Kabul proper, and chaired only one cabinet meeting. The author Roy Gutman of the United States Institute of Peace wrote in How We Missed the Story: Osama bin Laden, the Taliban, and the Hijacking of Afghanistan:

Hekmatyar had become prime minister ... But after chairing one cabinet meeting, Hekmatyar never returned to the capital, fearing, perhaps, a lynching by Kabulis infuriated over his role in destroying their city. Even his close aides were embarrassed. Hekmatyar spokesman Qutbuddin Helal was still setting up shop in the prime minister's palace when the city came under Hezb[-i Islami] rocket fire late that month. "We are here in Kabul and he is rocketing us. Now we have to leave. We can't do anything," he told Massoud aides.

Hekmatyar, who was generally opposed to coalition government and struggled for undisputed power, had conflicts with other parties over the selection of cabinet members. His forces started major attacks against Kabul for one month. The President, Burhanuddin Rabbani, was attacked when he attempted to meet Hekmatyar. Massoud resumed his responsibilities as minister of defense.

In May 1993, a new effort was made to reinstate the Islamabad Accord. In August, Massoud reached out to Hekmatyar in an attempt to broaden the government. By the end of 1993, Hekmatyar and the former communist general and militia leader, Abdul Rashid Dostum, were involved in secret negotiations encouraged by Pakistan's secret Inter-Services Intelligence, Iran's intelligence service, and Uzbekistan's Karimov administration. They planned a coup to oust the Rabbani administration and to attack Massoud in his northern areas.

==== War in Kabul, Taliban arise in the south (1994) ====
In January 1994, Hekmatyar and Dostum mounted a bombardment campaign against the capital and attacked Massoud's core areas in the northeast. Amin Saikal writes, Hekmatyar had the following objectives in all his operations:

The first was to make sure that Rabbani and Massoud were not allowed to consolidate power, build a credible administration, or expand their territorial control, so that the country would remain divided into small fiefdoms, run by various Muajhideen leaders and local warlords or a council of such elements, with only some of them allied to Kabul. The second was to ensure the Rabbani government acquired no capacity to dispense patronage, and to dissuade the Kabul population from giving more than limited support to the government. The third was to make Kabul an unsafe city for representatives of the international community and to prevent the Rabbani government from attracting the international support needed to begin the post-war reconstruction of Afghanistan and generate a level of economic activity which would enhance its credibility and popularity.

By mid-1994, Hekmatyar and Dostum were on the defensive in Kabul against Islamic State forces led by Massoud.
Southern Afghanistan had been neither under the control of foreign-backed militias nor of the government in Kabul, but was ruled by local Pashtun leaders, such as Gul Agha Sherzai, and their militias. In 1994, the Taliban (a movement originating from Jamiat Ulema-e-Islam-run religious schools for Afghan refugees in Pakistan) also developed in Afghanistan as a politico-religious force, reportedly in opposition to the tyranny of the local governor. When the Taliban took control of Kandahar in 1994, they forced the surrender of dozens of local Pashtun leaders who had presided over a situation of complete lawlessness and atrocities. In 1994, the Taliban took power in several provinces in southern and central Afghanistan.

==== Taliban siege of Kabul (1995–1996) ====
Hizb-i Islami had bombarded Kabul from January 1994 until February 1995 when the Taliban expelled Hizb from its Charasiab headquarters, after which the Taliban relaunched the bombardment of Kabul and started to besiege the town.

By early 1995, Massoud initiated a nationwide political process with the goal of national consolidation and democratic elections. He arranged a conference in three parts uniting political and cultural personalities, governors, commanders, clergymen and representatives, in order to reach a lasting agreement. Massoud's favourite for candidacy to the presidency was Dr. Mohammad Yusuf, the first democratic prime minister under Zahir Shah, the former king. In the first meeting representatives from 15 different Afghan provinces met, in the second meeting there were already 25 provinces participating.

Massoud also invited the Taliban to join the peace process wanting them to be a partner in providing stability to Afghanistan during such a process. But the Taliban, which had emerged over the course of 1994 in southern Afghanistan, were already at the doors of the capital city. Against the advice of his security personnel, Massoud went to talk to some Taliban leaders in Maidan Shar, Taliban territory. The Taliban declined to join the peace process leading toward general elections. When Massoud returned to Kabul unharmed, the Taliban leader who had received him as his guest paid with his life: he was killed by other senior Taliban for failing to assassinate Massoud while the possibility had presented itself. The Taliban, placing Kabul under a two-year siege and bombardment campaign from early 1995 onward, in later years committed massacres against civilians, compared by United Nations observers to those that happened during the War in Bosnia.

Neighboring Pakistan exerted strong influence over the Taliban. A publication with the George Washington University describes: "Initially, the Pakistanis supported ... Gulbuddin Hekmatyar ... When Hekmatyar failed to deliver for Pakistan, the administration began to support a new movement of religious students known as the Taliban." Many analysts like Amin Saikal describe the Taliban as developing into a proxy force for Pakistan's regional interests. The Taliban started shelling Kabul in early 1995 but were defeated by forces of the Islamic State government under Ahmad Shah Massoud. Amnesty International, referring to the Taliban offensive, wrote in a 1995 report:

This is the first time in several months that Kabul civilians have become the targets of rocket attacks and shelling aimed at residential areas in the city.

— Amnesty International, 1995

The Taliban's early victories in 1994 were followed by a series of defeats that resulted in heavy losses. The Taliban's first major offensive against the important western city of Herat, under the rule of Islamic state ally Ismail Khan, in February 1995 was defeated when Massoud airlifted 2,000 of his own core forces from Kabul to help defend Herat. Ahmed Rashid writes: "The Taliban had now been decisively pushed back on two fronts by the government and their political and military leadership was in disarray. Their image as potential peacemakers was badly dented, for in the eyes of many Afghans they had become nothing more than just another warlord party." International observers already speculated that the Taliban as a country-wide organization might have "run its course".

Mullah Omar consolidated his control of the Taliban and with foreign help rebuilt and re-equipped his forces. Pakistan increased its support to the Taliban. Its military advisers oversaw the restructuring of Taliban forces. The country provided armored pick-up trucks and other military equipment. Saudi Arabia provided the funding. Furthermore, there was a massive influx of 25,000 new Taliban fighters, many of them recruited in Pakistan. This enabled the Taliban to capture Herat to the west of Kabul in a surprise attack against the forces of Ismail Khan in September 1995. A nearly one-year siege and bombardment campaign against Kabul was again defeated by Massoud's forces.

Massoud and Rabbani meanwhile kept working on an internal Afghan peace process – successfully. By February 1996, all of Afghanistan's armed factions – except for the Taliban – had agreed to take part in the peace process and to set up a peace council to elect a new interim president. Many Pashtun areas under Taliban control had representatives also advocating for a peace agreement with the Islamic State government. But Taliban leader Mullah Omar and the Kandaharis surrounding him wanted to expand the war. At that point the Taliban leadership and their foreign supporters decided they needed to act quickly before the government could consolidate the new understanding between the parties. The Taliban moved against Jalalabad, under the control of the Pashtun Jalalabad Shura, to the east of Kabul. Part of the Jalalabad Shura was bribed with millions of dollars by the Taliban's foreign sponsors, especially Saudi Arabia, to vacate their positions. The Taliban's battle for Jalalabad was directed by Pakistani military advisers. Hundreds of Taliban crossed the Afghan-Pakistani border moving on Jalalabad from Pakistan and thereby suddenly placed to the east of Kabul. This left the capital city Kabul "wide open" to many sides as Ismail Khan had been defeated to the west, Gulbuddin Hekmatyar had vacated his positions to the south and the fall and surrender of Jalalabad had suddenly opened a new front to the east.

At that point Massoud decided to conduct a strategic retreat through a northern corridor, according to Ahmed Rashid, "knowing he could not defend [Kabul] from attacks coming from all four points of the compass. Nor did he want to lose the support of Kabul's population by fighting for the city and causing more bloodshed." On September 26, 1996, as the Taliban with military support by Pakistan and financial support by Saudi Arabia prepared for another major offensive, Massoud ordered a full retreat from Kabul. The Taliban marched into Kabul on September 27, 1996, and established the Islamic Emirate of Afghanistan. Massoud and his troops retreated to the northeast of Afghanistan which became the base for the still internationally recognized Islamic State of Afghanistan.

=== Resistance against the Taliban (1996–2001) ===
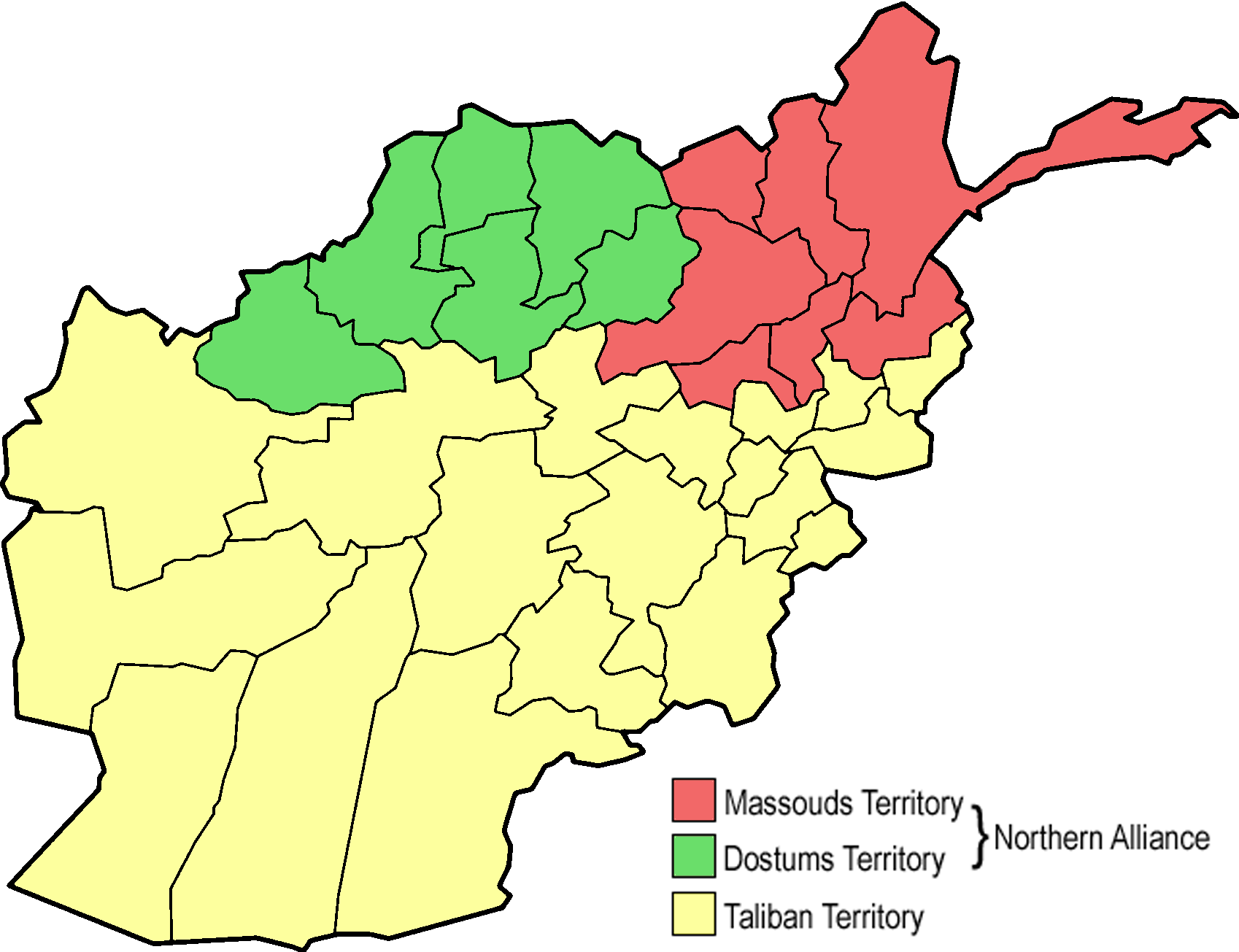
Map of the situation in Afghanistan in late 1996; Massoud (red), Dostum (green), Taliban (yellow)

==== United Islamic Front against the Taliban ====
Ahmad Shah Massoud created the United Islamic Front (Northern Alliance) against the Taliban advance. The United Front included forces and leaders from different political backgrounds as well as from all ethnicities of Afghanistan. From the Taliban conquest in 1996 until November 2001, the United Front controlled territory in which roughly 30% of Afghanistan's population was living, in provinces such as Badakhshan, Kapisa, Takhar and parts of Parwan, Kunar, Nuristan, Laghman, Samangan, Kunduz, Ghōr and Bamyan.

Meanwhile, the Taliban imposed their repressive regime in the parts of Afghanistan under their control. Hundreds of thousands of people fled to Northern Alliance territory, Pakistan and Iran. Massoud's soldiers held some 1,200 Taliban prisoners in the Panjshir Valley, 122 of them foreign Muslims who had come to Afghanistan to fight a jihad. In 1998, after the defeat of Abdul Rashid Dostum's faction in Mazar-i-Sharif, Ahmad Shah Massoud remained the only main leader of the United Front in Afghanistan and the only leader who was able to defend vast parts of his area against the Taliban. Most major leaders including the Islamic State's President Burhanuddin Rabbani, Abdul Rashid Dostum, and others, were living in exile. During this time, commentators remarked that "The only thing standing in the way of future Taliban massacres is Ahmad Shah Massoud."

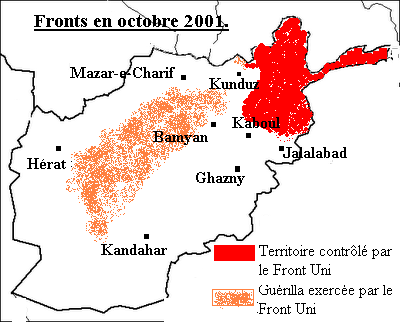
Map of the situation in Afghanistan August 2001 – October 2001

Massoud stated that the Taliban repeatedly offered him a position of power to make him stop his resistance. He declined, declaring the differences between their ideology and his own pro-democratic outlook on society to be insurmountable.

Massoud wanted to convince the Taliban to join a political process leading toward democratic elections in a foreseeable future. He also predicted that without assistance from Pakistan and external extremist groups, the Taliban would lose their hold on power.

In early 2001, the United Front employed a new strategy of local military pressure and global political appeals. Resentment was increasingly gathering against Taliban rule from the bottom of Afghan society including the Pashtun areas. At the same time, Massoud was very wary not to revive the failed Kabul government of the early 1990s. Already in 1999 the United Front leadership ordered the training of police forces specifically to keep order and protect the civilian population in case the United Front would be successful.

==== Cross-factional negotiations ====
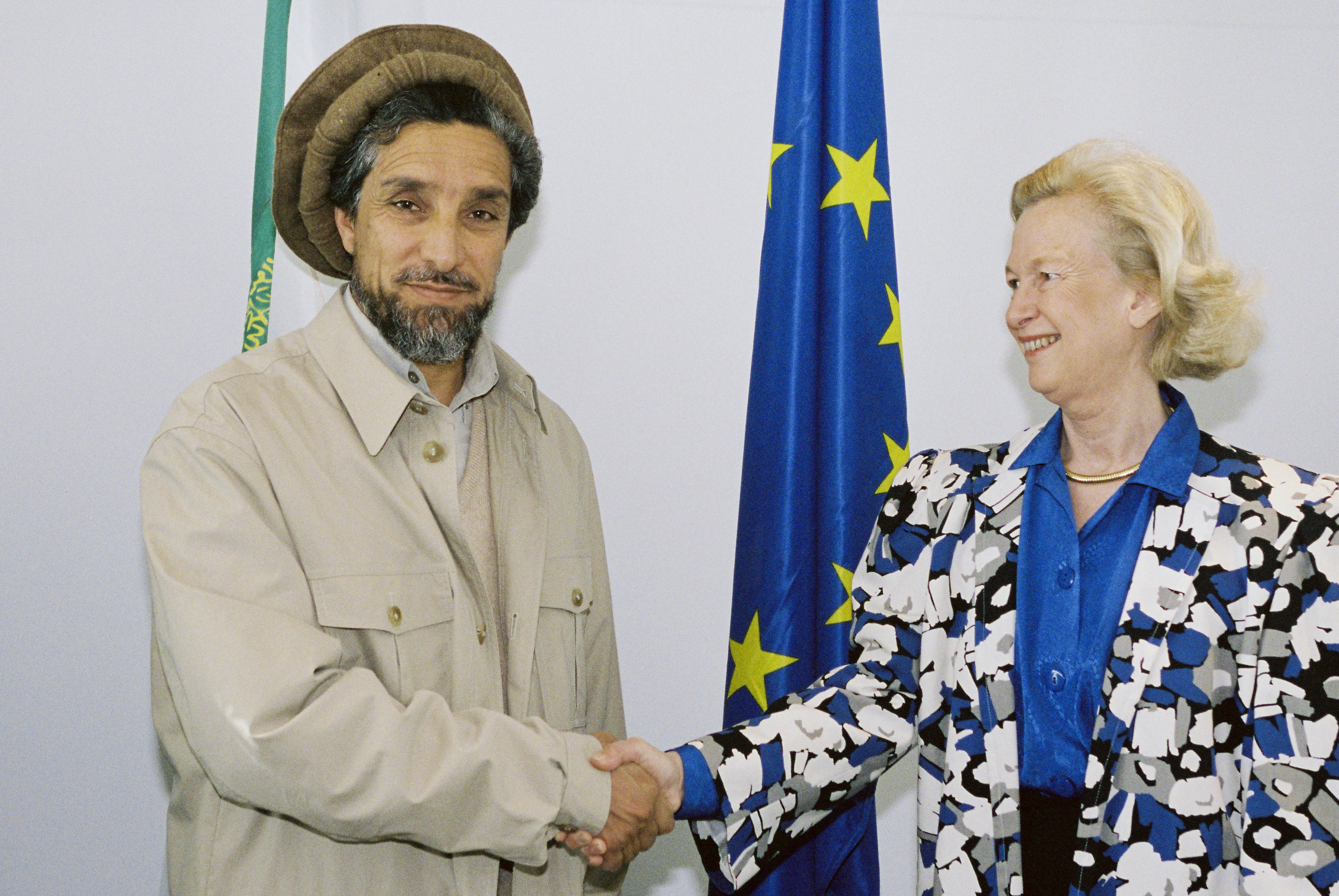
Massoud with President of the European Parliament Nicole Fontaine in April 2001

From 1999 onward, a renewed process was set into motion by the Tajik Ahmad Shah Massoud and the Pashtun Abdul Haq to unite all the ethnicities of Afghanistan. Massoud united the Tajiks, Hazara and Uzbeks as well as several Pashtun commanders under his United Front. Besides meeting with Pashtun tribal leaders and acting as a point of reference, Abdul Haq received increasing numbers of Pashtun Taliban themselves who were secretly approaching him. Some commanders who had worked for the Taliban military apparatus agreed to the plan to topple the Taliban regime as the Taliban lost support even among the Pashtuns. Senior diplomat and Afghanistan expert Peter Tomsen wrote that "[t]he 'Lion of Kabul' [Abdul Haq] and the 'Lion of Panjshir' [Ahmad Shah Massoud] would make a formidable anti-Taliban team if they combined forces. Haq, Massoud, and Karzai, Afghanistan's three leading moderates, could transcend the Pashtun – non-Pashtun, north-south divide." Steve Coll referred to this plan as a "grand Pashtun-Tajik alliance". The senior Hazara and Uzbek leaders took part in the process just like later Afghan president Hamid Karzai. They agreed to work under the banner of the exiled Afghan king Zahir Shah in Rome.

In November 2000, leaders from all ethnic groups were brought together in Massoud's headquarters in northern Afghanistan, travelling from other parts of Afghanistan, Pakistan, Europe, the United States to discuss a loya jirga for a settlement of Afghanistan's problems and to discuss the establishment of a post-Taliban government. In September 2001, an international official who met with representatives of the alliance remarked, "It's crazy that you have this today ... Pashtuns, Tajiks, Uzbeks, Hazara ... They were all ready to buy in to the process".

In early 2001, Ahmad Shah Massoud with leaders from all ethnicities of Afghanistan addressed the European Parliament in Brussels, asking the international community to provide humanitarian aid to the people of Afghanistan. He stated that the Taliban and al-Qaeda had introduced "a very wrong perception of Islam" and that without the support of Pakistan and bin Laden the Taliban would not be able to sustain their military campaign for up to a year. On that visit to Europe, he also warned the U.S. about bin Laden.

==== The areas of Massoud ====
Life in the areas under direct control of Massoud was different from the life in the areas under Taliban or Dostum's control. In contrast to the time of chaos in which all structures had collapsed in Kabul, Massoud was able to control most of the troops under his direct command well during the period starting in late 1996. Massoud always controlled the Panjshir, Takhar, parts of Parwan and Badakhshan during the war. Some other provinces (notably Kunduz, Baghlan, Nuristan and the north of Kabul) were captured by his forces from the Taliban and lost again from time to time as the frontlines varied.

Massoud created democratic institutions which were structured into several committees: political, health, education and economic. Still, many people came to him personally when they had a dispute or problem and asked him to solve their problems.

In September 2000, Massoud signed the Declaration of the Essential Rights of Afghan Women drafted by Afghan women. The declaration established gender equality in front of the law and the right of women to political participation, education, work, freedom of movement and speech. In the areas of Massoud, women and girls did not have to wear the Afghan burqa by law. They were allowed to work and to go to school. Although it was a time of war, girls' schools were operating in some districts. In at least two known instances, Massoud personally intervened against cases of forced marriage in favour of the women to make their own choice.

While it was Massoud's stated personal conviction that men and women are equal and should enjoy the same rights, he also had to deal with Afghan traditions which he said would need a generation or more to overcome. In his opinion, that could only be achieved through education. Author Pepe Escobar wrote in Asia Times:

Massoud is adamant that in Afghanistan women have suffered oppression for generations. He says that "the cultural environment of the country suffocates women. But the Taliban exacerbate this with oppression." His most ambitious project is to shatter this cultural prejudice and so give more space, freedom and equality to women – they would have the same rights as men.

— Pepe Escobar, in 'Massoud: From Warrior to Statesman'

Humayun Tandar, who took part as an Afghan diplomat in the 2001 International Conference on Afghanistan in Bonn, said that "strictures of language, ethnicity, region were [also] stifling for Massoud. That is why ... he wanted to create a unity which could surpass the situation in which we found ourselves and still find ourselves to this day." This applied also to strictures of religion. Jean-José Puig describes how Massoud often led prayers before a meal or at times asked his fellow Muslims to lead the prayer but also did not hesitate to ask the Jewish Princeton Professor Michael Barry or his Christian friend Jean-José Puig: "Jean-José, we believe in the same God. Please, tell us the prayer before lunch or dinner in your own language."

==== International relations ====
U.S. policy regarding Massoud, the Taliban and Afghanistan remained ambiguous and differed between the various U.S. government agencies.

In 1997, U.S. State Department's Robin Raphel suggested to Massoud he should surrender to the Taliban. He soundly rejected the proposal.

At one point in the war, in 1997, two top foreign policy officials in the Clinton administration flew to northern Afghanistan in an attempt to convince Massoud not to take advantage of a strategic opportunity to make crucial gains against the Taliban.

In 1998, a U.S. Defense Intelligence Agency analyst, Julie Sirrs, visited Massoud's territories privately, having previously been denied official permission to do so by her agency. She reported that Massoud had conveyed warnings about strengthened ties between the Taliban and foreign Islamist terrorists. Returning home, she was sacked from her agency for insubordination, because at that time the U.S. administration had no trust in Massoud.

In the meantime, the only collaboration between Massoud and another U.S. intelligence service, the Central Intelligence Agency (CIA), consisted of an effort to trace Osama bin Laden following the 1998 embassy bombings. The U.S. and the European Union provided no support to Massoud for the fight against the Taliban.

A change of policy, lobbied for by CIA officers on the ground who had visited the area of Massoud, regarding support to Massoud, was underway in the course of 2001. According to Steve Coll's book Ghost Wars: (Note: Ghost Wars won the 2005 Pulitzer Prize for General Nonfiction)

The CIA officers admired Massoud greatly. They saw him as a Che Guevara figure, a great actor on history's stage. Massoud was a poet, a military genius, a religious man, and a leader of enormous courage who defied death and accepted its inevitability, they thought. ... In his house there were thousands of books: Persian poetry, histories of the Afghan war in multiple languages, biographies of other military and guerilla leaders. In their meetings Massoud wove sophisticated, measured references to Afghan history and global politics into his arguments. He was quiet, forceful, reserved, and full of dignity, but also light in spirit. The CIA team had gone into the Panshjir as unabashed admirers of Massoud. Now their convictions deepened.

— Steve Coll, in Ghost Wars

U.S. Congressman Dana Rohrabacher also recalled:

[B]etween Bush's inauguration and 9/11, I met with the new national security staff on 3 occasions, including one meeting with Condoleezza Rice to discuss Afghanistan. There were, in fact, signs noted in an overview story in The Washington Post about a month ago that some steps were being made to break away from the previous administration's Afghan policy.

CIA lawyers, working with officers in the Near East Division and Counterterrorist Center, began to draft a formal, legal presidential finding for Bush's signature authorizing a new covert action program in Afghanistan, the first in a decade that sought to influence the course of the Afghan war in favour of Massoud. This change in policy was finalized in August 2001 when it was too late.

The Northern alliance supposedly also received minor aid from Tajikistan, Russia, India and Iran because of their opposition to the Taliban and the Pakistani control over the Taliban's Emirate. Their support remained limited to the most needed things. Meanwhile, Pakistan engaged up to 28,000 Pakistani nationals and regular Pakistani army troops to fight alongside the Taliban and Al Qaeda forces against Massoud.

In April 2001, the president of the European Parliament, Nicole Fontaine (who called Massoud the "pole of liberty in Afghanistan"), invited Massoud with the support of French and Belgian politicians to address the European Parliament in Brussels, Belgium. In his speech, he asked for humanitarian aid for the people of Afghanistan. Massoud further went on to warn that his intelligence agents had gained limited knowledge about a large-scale terrorist attack on U.S. soil being imminent.

== Assassination ==
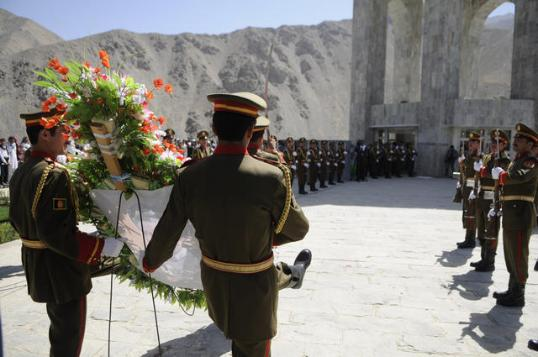
Afghan National Army honouring Massoud's resistance at his tomb and memorial in September 2010

Massoud, then aged 48, was the target of an assassination plot in Khwājah Bahā ud Dīn (Khvājeh Bahāuḏḏīn), Takhar Province in northeastern Afghanistan on September 9, 2001. The attackers' names were alternately given as Dahmane Abd al-Sattar, husband of Malika El Aroud, and Bouraoui el-Ouaer; or 34-year-old Karim Touzani and 26-year-old Kacem Bakkali.

The attackers claimed to be Belgians originally from Morocco. According to Le Monde they transited through the municipality of Molenbeek. Their passports turned out to be stolen and their nationality was later determined to be Tunisian. Waiting for almost three weeks (during which they also interviewed Burhanuddin Rabbani and Abdul Rasul Sayyaf) for an interview opportunity, on September 8, 2001, an aide to Massoud recalls the would-be suicide attackers "were so worried" and threatened to leave if the interview did not happen in the next 24 hours (until September 10, 2001). They were finally granted an interview. During the interview, they set off a bomb composed of explosives hidden in the camera and in a battery-pack belt. Massoud died in a helicopter that was taking him to an Indian military field hospital at Farkhor in nearby Tajikistan. He was pronounced dead in or near Dushanbe, Tajikistan. The explosion also killed Mohammed Asim Suhail, a United Front official, while Muhammad Fahim Dashti and Massoud Khalili were injured. One of the suicide attackers, Bouraoui, was killed by the explosion, while Dahmane Abd al-Sattar was captured and shot while trying to escape.

Despite initial denials by the United Front, news of Massoud's death was reported almost immediately, appearing on the BBC, and in European and North American newspapers on September 10, 2001. On September 16, the United Front officially announced that Massoud had died of injuries in the suicide attack. Massoud was buried in his home village of Bazarak in the Panjshir Valley. The funeral, although in a remote rural area, was attended by hundreds of thousands of people.

Massoud had survived a number of assassination attempts over a period of 26 years, including attempts made by al-Qaeda, the Taliban, the Soviet KGB, the Afghan communist KHAD and Hekmatyar. The first attempt on Massoud's life was supposedly carried out by Hekmatyar and two Pakistani ISI agents in 1975 when Massoud was 22 years old. In early 2001, al-Qaeda would-be assassins were captured by Massoud's forces while trying to enter his territory.

=== Connection to the September 11 attacks ===
The assassination of Massoud is considered to have a strong connection to the September 11 attacks in 2001 on U.S. soil, which killed nearly 3,000 people. It appeared to have been the major terrorist attack which Massoud had warned against in his speech to the European Parliament several months earlier. Al-Qaeda's motive for the assassination is believed to have been to secure the Taliban's support of Osama bin Laden after the planned attacks. By eliminating Massoud, it was expected that the remaining anti-Taliban forces in Afghanistan would collapse, allowing the Taliban to solidify their control over the country. Bin Laden thought that this, in turn, would make the Taliban indebted to him, and he believed their support would be crucial for his planned war against the United States.

In late 2001, a computer was seized that was stolen from an office used by al-Qaeda immediately after the fall of Kabul in November. This computer was mainly used by Aiman al-Zawahri and contained the letter with the interview request for Massoud. The two assassins had completed military training in training camps in Afghanistan at the end of 2000 and were selected for the suicide mission in the spring or early summer of the following year. The Afghan publicist Waheed Muzhda, who worked for the Taliban in the Foreign Ministry, confirmed the two assassins met with al-Qaeda officials in Kandahar and bin Laden and al-Zawahri saw them off when they left. Following the assassination, bin Laden had an emissary deliver Dahmane Abd al-Sattar's widow a letter with $500 in an envelope to settle a debt. Abu Zubaydah testified to the FBI that the Taliban had been very grateful to al-Qaeda's leadership for the assassination. An al-Qaeda magazine in Saudi Arabia later published a biography of Youssef al-Aayyiri, who headed al-Qaeda's operations in Saudi Arabia from 2002, which described al-Qaeda's involvement in Massoud's assassination. Osama bin Laden commissioned the assassination attempt to appease the Taliban because of the imminent terrorist attacks in the US, which would cause serious problems for the Taliban.

The Taliban denied any involvement in Massoud's assassination, and it is very unlikely that they were privy to the assassination plans. There were a few minor attacks by the Taliban after the attack, but no major offensive.

=== Investigative commission ===
In April 2003, the Karzai administration created a commission to investigate the assassination of Massoud. In 2003, French investigators and the FBI were able to trace the provenance of the camera used in the assassination, which had been stolen in France some time earlier.

== Assessment and legacy ==
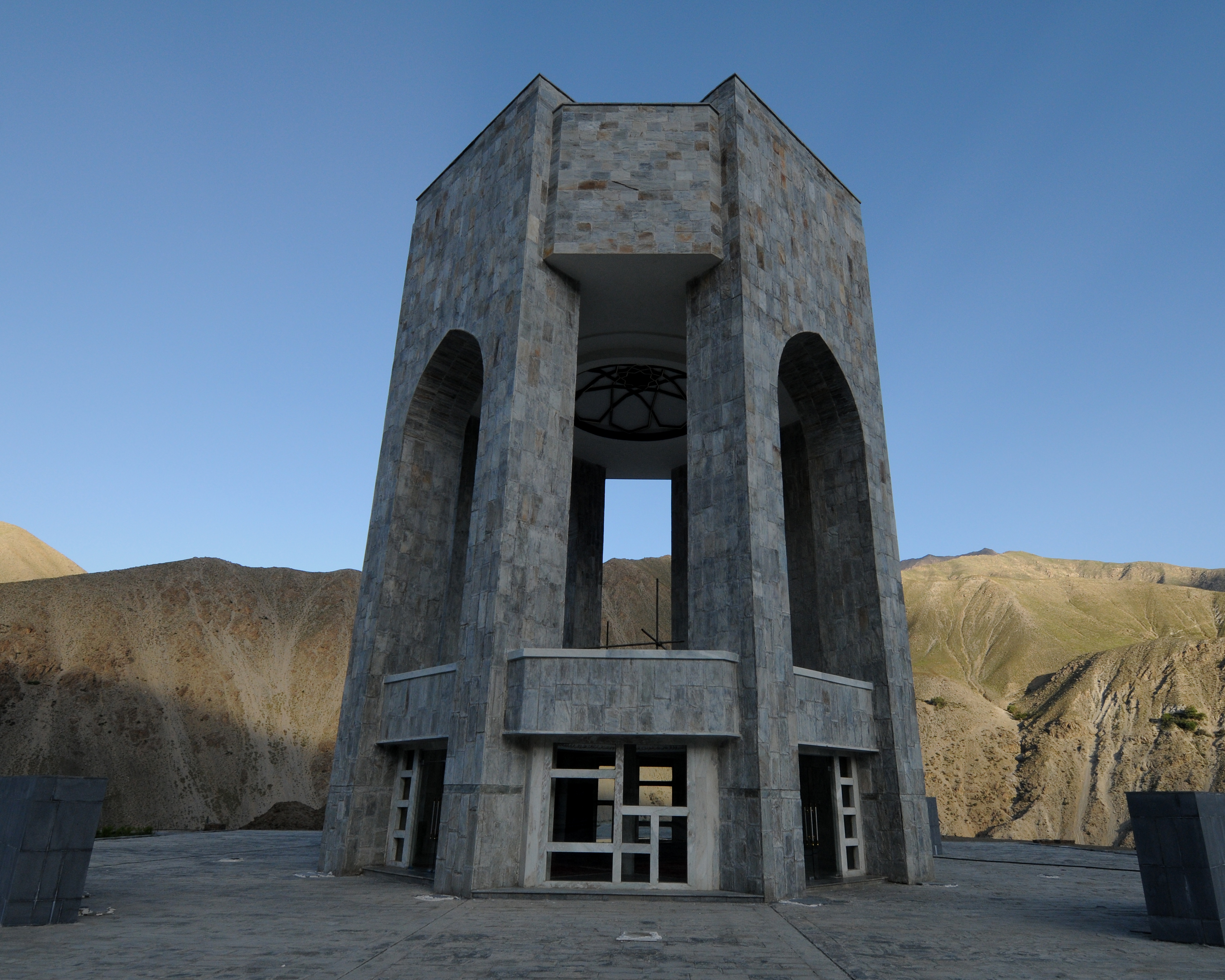
Massoud's tomb in Panjshir, 2011.

Massoud is regarded as one of the greatest guerrilla commanders of the 20th century. He is a folk hero among Afghans, especially Tajiks, and commonly known by the title "Lion of Panjshir" (Shir-i Panjshir in Persian). The Wall Street Journal referred to Massoud as "The Afghan Who Won the Cold War", referring to the global significance of the Soviet defeat in Afghanistan for the subsequent collapse of the Eastern Bloc.

He was the only chief Afghan leader who never left Afghanistan in the fight against the Soviet Union and later in the fight against the Taliban Emirate. In the areas under his direct control, such as Panjshir, some parts of Parwan and Takhar, Massoud established democratic institutions. One refugee who cramped his family of 27 into an old jeep to flee from the Taliban to the area of Massoud described Massoud's territory in 1997 as "the last tolerant corner of Afghanistan".

In 2001, the Afghan interim government under president Hamid Karzai officially awarded Massoud the title of "Hero of the Afghan Nation". One analyst in 2004 said:

One man holds a greater political punch than all 18 living [Afghan] presidential candidates combined. Though already dead for three years.... Since his death on September 9, 2001 at the hands of two al Qaeda-linked Islamic radicals, Massoud has been transformed from mujahedin to national hero – if not saint. Pictures of Massoud, the Afghan mujahedin who battled the Soviets, other warlords, and the Taliban for more than 20 years, vastly outnumber those of any other Afghan including those of Karzai.

- The Massoud Foundation was established in 2003 to provide humanitarian assistance to Afghans through economic and social programs that include business development, reconstruction and infrastructure improvements, and education programs. It promotes justice, gender equality, fair government, and human rights.
- A major road in Kabul was named Great Massoud Road.
- A monument to Massoud was installed outside the former US Embassy.
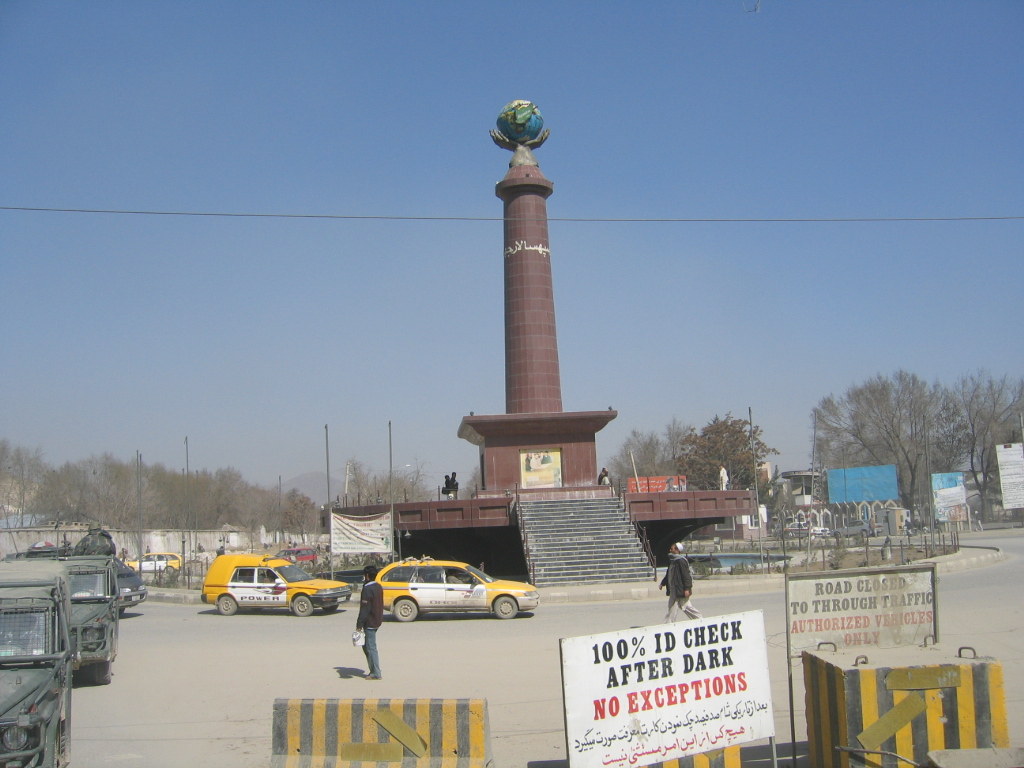
- The Massoud Circle in Kabul, 2006
  A street in New Delhi, India, is named after Ahmad Shah Massoud. It is the first time that such an honour has been extended to a leader from that country as part of close ties between Afghanistan and India. A street in New Delhi was named after him in 2007.
- Magpul Massoud was a 7.62 NATO rifle produced by Magpul which was named after himself.

The road near the Afghanistan Embassy is a "symbol of ties" that binds the two nations that have always "enjoyed excellent relations".

His friend Abdullah Abdullah said that Massoud was different from the other guerilla leaders. "He is a hero who led a clear struggle for the values of the people".

In a 2001 mourning ceremony at Moscow to honour the memory of Ahmad Shah Massoud, one-time foe Colonel Abdul Qadir stated: "Though Massoud and I used to be enemies, I am sure he deserves great respect as an outstanding military leader and, first of all, as a patriot of his country".

=== Honors outside Afghanistan ===
In 2007, the government of India decided to name a road in New Delhi's Chanakyapuri district after Massoud.

In February 2021, the Council of Paris in France honored Massoud by installing a plaque in the 8th arrondissement of Paris. The decision reflected Massoud's unique connections with France. In March 2021, the Mayor of Paris named a pathway in the Champs-Élysées gardens after Massoud. The ceremony was attended by Massoud's son and former president Hamid Karzai.

He has been posthumously honored by a plaque in France in 2021, and in the same year was awarded with the highest honor of Tajikistan, the Order of Ismoili Somoni, on 2 September 2021.

Under Taliban-led Afghanistan, public celebrations of Massoud have been restricted and his archrival Mullah Omar is presented as a national hero instead.

=== Views on Pakistan and potential al-Qaeda attacks ===
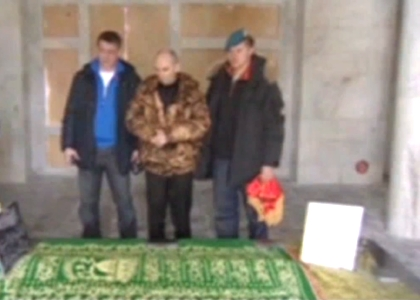
Group of former Soviet military men, led by Col. Leonid Khabarov (center) standing by Massoud's Tomb, commemorating his memory (2009)

Massoud praised Pakistan for their support to the mujahideen groups during the Soviet-Afghan War; however, after the war, he increasingly distrusted the Pakistanis and eventually kept his distance from them due to their support for Hekmatyar and later the Taliban. In a 1999 interview, Massoud says "They [Pakistan] are trying to turn us into a colony. Without them there would be no war".

In the spring 2001, Ahmad Shah Massoud addressed the European Parliament in Brussels, saying that Pakistan was behind the situation in Afghanistan. He also said that he believed that, without the support of Pakistan, Osama bin Laden, and Saudi Arabia, the Taliban would not be able to sustain their military campaign for up to a year. He said the Afghan population was ready to rise against them. Addressing the United States specifically, he warned that should the U.S. not work for peace in Afghanistan and put pressure on Pakistan to cease their support to the Taliban, the problems of Afghanistan would soon become the problems of the U.S. and the world.

Declassified Defense Intelligence Agency (DIA) documents from November 2001 show that Massoud had gained "limited knowledge... regarding the intentions of al-Qaeda to perform a terrorist act against the U.S. on a scale larger than the 1998 bombing of the U.S. embassies in Kenya and Tanzania." They noted that he warned about such attacks.

=== Succession and resistance to the Taliban by his son ===
In September 2019, his son Ahmad Massoud was declared as his successor. Following the 2021 Taliban offensive and the Fall of Kabul, Massoud established the National Resistance Front (NRF) to the Taliban in the Panjshir Valley.

== Personal life ==
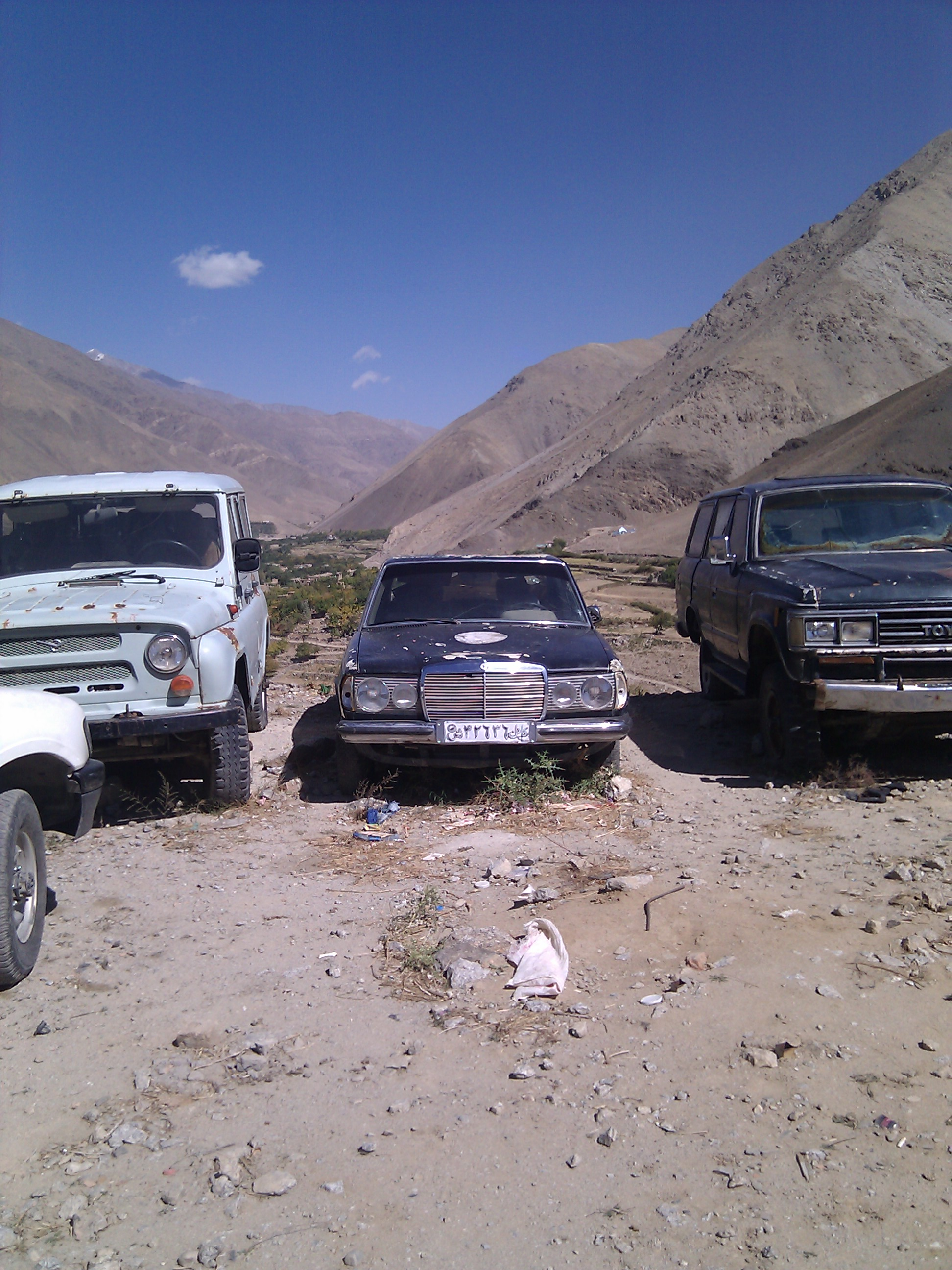
Massoud's private vehicles, parked in Panjshir (pictured 2010)

Massoud was married to Sediqa Massoud. They had one son, Ahmad Massoud (born in 1989) and five daughters (Fatima born in 1992, Mariam born in 1993, Ayesha born in 1995, Zohra born in 1996 and Nasrine born in 1998). In 2005 Sediqa Massoud published a personal account on her life with Massoud (co-authored by two women's rights activists and friends of Sediqa Massoud, Chékéba Hachemi and Marie-Francoise Colombani) called "Pour l'amour de Massoud" (For the love of Massoud), in which she describes a decent and loving husband.

Massoud liked reading and had a library of 3,000 books at his home in Panjshir. He used to read the works of revolutionaries Mao Zedong and Che Guevara, and was a great admirer of Charles de Gaulle, founder of the French Fifth Republic. Massoud said his favorite author was Victor Hugo and he was also a fan of classical Persian poetry, including the works of Bidel and Hafez. He was keen at playing football and chess.

Massoud's reputation for fearlessness is illustrated by a story about him told in Afghanistan, which cannot be confirmed. Once, while inspecting the front lines with a deputy, Massoud's driver had become lost and driven into the middle of a Taliban encampment. In tremendous peril, since he was recognized immediately, Massoud demanded to see the Taliban commander, making polite conversation for just long enough to bluff that he had arrived intentionally and not accidentally. The confused Taliban allowed him to leave.

Massoud's family since his death have had a great deal of prestige in the politics of Afghanistan. One of his six brothers, Ahmad Zia Massoud, was the Vice President of Afghanistan from 2004 until 2009 under the first democratically elected government of Afghanistan. Unsuccessful attempts have been made on the life of Ahmad Zia Massoud in 2004 and late 2009. The Associated Press reported that eight Afghans died in the attempt on Ahmad Zia Massoud's life. Ahmad Zia Massoud founded the National Front of Afghanistan (a United Front group). Another brother, Ahmad Wali Massoud, was Afghanistan's Ambassador to the United Kingdom from 2002 to 2006. He was a member of Abdullah Abdullah's National Coalition of Afghanistan (another United Front group).

=== In literature ===
==== Essay ====
- Sebastian Junger, one of the last Western journalists to interview Massoud in depth, featured him in an essay in his 2002 collection, Fire.

==== Fiction ====
- Massoud is the subject of Ken Follett's 1986 novel Lie Down With Lions, about the Soviet-Afghan War.
- He also is featured as a historical figure in James McGee's 1989 thriller, Crow's War.
- Massoud is the subject of Olivier Weber's novel Massoud's Confession, about the Islam of Enlightenment and the need to reform religious practices.
- Massoud is played by Mido Hamada in the 2006 miniseries The Path to 9/11.

== Bibliography ==
- "Casting Shadows: War Crimes and Crimes against Humanity: 1978–2001" (PDF). Afghanistan Justice Project. 2005.
- Akbarzadeh, Shahram; Yasmeen, Samina (2005). Islam And the West: Reflections from Australia. University of New South Wales Press.
- Barry, Michael (2002). Massoud : De l'islamisme à la liberté Paperback. L. Audibert. ISBN 9782847490022.
- Bergen, Peter (2021). The Rise and Fall of Osama Bin Laden. Simon and Schuster. ISBN 978-1-9821-7052-3.
- Caldwell, Dan (February 17, 2011). Vortex of Conflict: U.S. Policy Toward Afghanistan, Pakistan, and Iraq. Stanford University Press. ISBN 978-0-8047-7749-0.
- Coll, Steve (2004). Ghost Wars. The Secret History of the CIA, Afghanistan, and bin Laden, from the Soviet Invasion to September 10, 2001. New York: Penguin Books. ISBN 978-0-14-303466-7.
- Gall, Sandy (2021). Afghan Napoleon: The Life of Ahmad Shah Massoud. London: Haus Publishing. ISBN 978-1-913368-22-7.
- Grad, Marcela (2009). Massoud: An Intimate Portrait of the Legendary Afghan Leader. Webster University Press. ISBN 9780982161500.
- Gutman, Roy (2008). How We Missed the Story: Osama Bin Laden, the Taliban and the Hijacking of Afghanistan. Washington D.C.: Endowment of the United States Institute of Peace. ISBN 978-1-60127-024-5.
- Blood-stained Hands: Macbeth in Kunju Form. Human Rights Watch. 1994.
- Isby, David (1989). War in a distant country, Afghanistan: invasion and resistance. Arms and Armour Press. ISBN 0-85368-769-2.
- Nojumi, Neamatollah (2002). The rise of the Taliban in Afghanistan: mass mobilization, civil war, and the future of the region (1st ed.). New York; Houndmills, Basingstoke, Hampshire: Palgrave. ISBN 9780312295844.
- Miller, Judith (January 17, 2001). "Holy Warriors: Killing for the Glory of God, in a Land Far From Home". The New York Times.
- Rashid, Ahmed (2001). Taliban: Militant Islam, Oil and Fundamentalism in Central Asia. Yale Nota Bene Books. ISBN 978-0300089028.
- Roy, Olivier (1990). Islam and Resistance in Afghanistan. Cambridge University Press. ISBN 978-0-521-39700-1.
- Ryan, Johnny (2007). Countering Militant Islamist Radicalisation on the Internet. Institute of European Affairs.
- Saikal, Amin (2004). Modern Afghanistan: A History of Struggle and Survival. London & New York: I.B. Tauris & Co Ltd. ISBN 1-85043-437-9.

Government offices
Preceded by Mohammad Aslam Watanjar	Minister of Defense; June 1992 – September 2001	Succeeded by Mohammed Fahim
