= Panjshir Front =

Military association

Coordinates: 35.2667°N 69.4667°E

Panjshir offensives
- Part of the Soviet–Afghan War
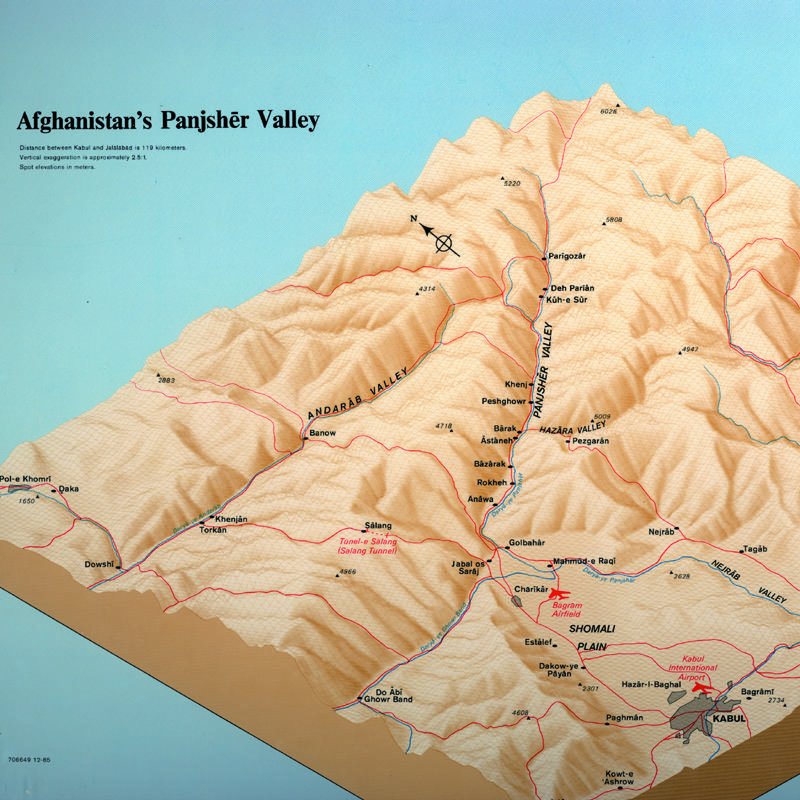
- Map of the Panjshir valley
Date	1980–1985
Location	Panjshir Valley, Afghanistan
Result	Mujahideen victory: Soviet occupation of Panjshir Valley; Soviet withdrawal; Mujahideen reoccupation of Panjshir Valley

Belligerents
Soviet Union; Afghanistan	Shura-e Nazar; Supported by: United Kingdom: MI6

Commanders and leaders
(Soviet Union) Leonid Brezhnev (Soviet Union) Konstantin Chernenko (Soviet Union) Sergei Sokolov (Soviet Union) Norat Ter-Grigoryants (Soviet Union) Ruslan Aushev (Afghanistan) Babrak Karmal	Ahmad Shah Massoud (mainly)

Panjshir Front was a military association of the Afghan opposition in the Panjshir Valley during the Soviet–Afghan War (1979–1989) under the command of field commander Ahmad Shah Massoud. The Panjshir Front played a leading role in organizing and coordinating the military and political activities of the fronts by the type of the Islamic Army – the Islamic Society of Afghanistan – in five (5) northeastern provinces adjacent to Panjshiru: Kunduz, Baghlan, Takhar, Parvan, Kapisa.

Later, on the basis of the Panjshir and the northeastern fronts, the so-called "Supervisory Council" was created, which resolved military-political and economic tasks in organizing the activities of the anti-government forces of the entire region. Later such associations began to be established in the west and south of Afghanistan, the main role in them was played by the Islamic Society of Afghanistan party.

== Structure ==
The expansion of the territory controlled by the Panjshir Front dictated the creation of military and administrative structures simultaneously. There were created: judicial committees, a committee on culture, a council for education and culture, as well as a council of ulama. The Panjshir Front created 22 (twenty-two) bases scattered throughout the length of the valley.

In order to help the weak bases, mobile groups were created, capable of entering the battle on the Panjshir before it developed and attacking the enemy in areas beyond the valley. They were sent to help the bases that were subjected to the offensive of the Soviet troops.

Each of the bases was located in one of the secondary gorges adjoining the valley and subdivided, in turn, into two main and one auxiliary garrisons; thus, some flexibility was achieved, and it was difficult for the Soviet troops to liquidate the base with a swoop. The composition of the mobile groups was recruited from among the various bases of the Panjshir valley.

This approach increased the fighting spirit of the Panjshir people and helped to establish interaction between various bases and minimizing the contradictions that sometimes occurred between the front leadership and the command of some of the bases.

In the event of a defeat of a mobile group, such an approach in the formation of its personnel contributed to a more even distribution of losses between different bases, rather than their concentration in one area.

During the fighting during the nine months of 1982, 1983 – the leadership of the Panjshir Front, using the acquired combat experience, divided the members of the bases into members of strike groups and employees, rear and economic issues.

The formation of a supervisory board and the unification of the activities of the leadership of the Panjshir Front with the activities of this council, which included 50 of the most experienced Panjshir warriors and 50 rebels from other fronts, subsequently contributed to the formation of the leadership of the so-called Islamic army on their basis.

Each of the rebel groups consisted of 32 (thirty) armed, trained and equipped soldiers. The armament of this group consisted of two RPG-7 hand grenade launchers, one PK machine gun and AK-47 assault rifles. At the head of the group was the commander with his deputy. The main group, in turn, was divided into three smaller ones, ten (thirteen) each, one of whom was its commander. This group was able to conduct offensive and defensive actions and be in reserve.

== The tasks of the Front ==
The leadership of the Panjshir Front since the beginning of the armed struggle was focused on expanding the territory of military operations against the OKVA. To achieve this result was possible: the distribution of weapons, financial assistance, combat training – directing to neighboring fronts, to enhance combat experience and skills. The main political task of the Panjshir Front was to represent a symbol of Afghan resistance.

== Geographical position ==
Panjshir Gorge is an extended, narrow valley, surrounded, on both sides enclosed by high mountains. On both sides to it adjoins set of small gorges. It is located to the north-east of Kabul, the capital of the DRA and borders on the provinces: Parvan, Kapisa, Lagman, Badakhshan, Takhar and Baghlan.

There are two strategic points with the Panjshir: Salang, called the people's throat Kabul and the military airfield Bagram. The Panjshir Front actively used this intimacy in the fight against ACVA and the Government forces. In this regard, the leaders of the front came to the conclusion that one of the main tasks is to establish unity of action between territorially close fronts.

== Prior events ==
With the introduction of Soviet troops into Afghanistan, in order to organize guerrilla warfare in the central and north-eastern part of the country, a single combat command, the spiritual leader Burhanuddin Rabbani and the largest field commander Ahmad Shah Massoud (A.Sh. Masud), the Panjshir Front was established – the advanced combat unit of the IAO party. To fight the Government in Kabul and the Soviet troops, the IOA among the "Seven Islamic parties", more commonly known as the Peshawar Seven Union, received significant financial and military assistance – as part of the secret operation "Cyclone" from the US CIA, as well as a number of Western European countries; states of the Islamic world and the Middle East: Saudi Arabia, Pakistan, Iran, the United Arab Emirates, Egypt, Jordan and others. However, despite extensive external financial assistance, the Panjshir Front mobilized all available domestic economic resources in the valley, took full control over the extraction of all minerals in the valley. Significant funds came to the IOA budget from the development of deposits of emeralds.

In the mining areas of silver in the rock, a large number of abandoned mines formed resembling a sieve with a large number of holes. Later on in these mines the support and observation posts of the Panjshir people were equipped. The gorge served as a convenient transport corridor for the supply of arms and ammunition from Pakistan by packs of transport, as well as a place for the organization of training bases for rebels, both in the valley itself and in the adjacent ones.

== Logistics support ==
The success of the Panjshir Front is largely due to the formation of the rear reserves. In the upper part of the valley there are significant deposits of emeralds. The population of these regions from time immemorial led their development, the income received from the sale of realized rough jewelry, in the amount of 20% transferred to the Panjshir Front.

In the upper reaches of the Panjshir canyon, in Pavat, in the villages: Pirjah, Mabain, Zaradhak – 10-13 kilometers southeast and east of the settlement Pishgor, each of which was concentrated from 20 to 40 mines, as well as in the Darkhin gorge. The population of this region existed with funds from the sale of emeralds and paid a quitrile from the mined stones to the treasury of the panjshir front.

The emerald, extracted in the valley, was transported to Pakistan for processing, and from there it was distributed all over the world. The amount of funds raised for emeralds, on average per year was up to $10 million. Mining on rocky grounds was carried out by Japanese drilling rigs with the involvement of Western European engineers. In addition to the extraction of emeralds, Ahmad Shah Massoud's supporters in Dzharm county in Badakhshan province extracted lapis lazuli.

In addition to mining precious and semiprecious stones, silver mines have been developed in the lower reaches of the Panjshir Gorge in the Jary-ab region since ancient times. The extracted silver was sent to the Andarab valley, which came in contact with the Panjshir, where silver products were made from it.

In order to replenish the treasury of the Panjshir Front, a decision was made to collect taxes from the Panjshir population: from the harvest of agricultural crops; with income from the mining industry – extraction of emeralds and lapis lazuli; a five per cent tax levied on the salaries of civil servants and the incomes of artisans. The proceeds from these proceeds were transferred to the financial committee that was available at each rebel base.

=== The bases of the Panjshir Front ===
According to Abd Al-Hafiz Mansur, an Afghan historian, a panjshirzer describing the activities of the Panjshir Front, he had bases in the valley: Parian, Khawak, Dasht-i Ravat, Safid Chehr, Hanch, Pashgur, Am-times, Astana, Paranda, Chamalurda, Tavah, Anaba, Zamankur, Shotal, Da-ra-yi Khazar, Sadakh va Karaman, Abdullah-Heil, Manjhur, Talha wa Mala, Hasarak, Abdara, Faraj.

== Panjshirsky and North-Eastern fronts ==
At the initial stage of the Afghan war, in a limited theater of military operations – Soviet troops were opposed by a few detachments of mujahedin, formed on the basis of clan, tribal and religious (Sunnis, Shiites, Ismailis) belonging. Groupings, vying and often, openly enmity, with each other.

The split of the opposition was in the hands of Soviet military intelligence officers and was used in the interests of the troops. And yet, in the face of the approaching large-scale military operations from the Soviet troops, the unity between the conflicting opposition parties was temporarily, nevertheless, established.

Discarding all existing contradictions and strife, the disparate formations acted as a united front. In the future, for effective command and control of troops and logistics, the leaders of the party IOA, a plan of struggle was developed.

He consisted in uniting the armed detachments along the entire length of the Panjshir Gorge into a powerful strike force, known as the Panjshir Front (PF). The PF was well organized in terms of combat command and logistics. On the basis of the PF, the IOA party set a goal to make it a symbol of the entire Afghan resistance.

The leading role of the PF consisted in the planning, organization and management of the operations of the IAO units in the central, north-eastern and western parts of the country, in close cooperation with other rebel fronts, in the likeness of a regular army.

The commanders of the IAO formations of the "center" and "north-east" group came to the need to reach an agreement on full interaction, and depending on the evolving situation, and to unified combat management of the neighboring fronts.

The resulting combat experience with their feat to the formation of the two main fronts – "panjshir" and "northeast". The reason for this is the effectiveness of the use of forces and means, as well as control over the spending of financial resources allocated by foreign sponsors to guerrilla warfare in a particular region, and the desire to achieve leadership in the competition for the volume of distributed external assistance.

Equally with the IOA, a "pro-Pashtun" Islamic Party of Afghanistan (IPA), formed three months earlier than the IOA, in 1973 in the city of Peshawar (Pakistan), the spiritual leader Gulbuddin Hekmatyar, held a strong position in the north-eastern region. IPA is the second major political party in the Union of Mujahideen of Afghanistan, or the Peshawar Seven.

== Conflict with the Islamic Party of Afghanistan ==
The degree of influence of the IPA of Gulbuddin Hekmatyar in the north-eastern and northern provinces of Afghanistan, due to the large number of Pashtun living in the region that inhabited this region in the 19th and 20th centuries, was also high.

The mass resettlement of Pashtun to the northern provinces of the country – Afghanistan's Turkestan, Kattagan (a historical region in the north-east of the country) and Badakhshan, from the places of their traditional residence (eastern, south-eastern and southern provinces) at the turn of the century was called "Pushtunization" of the northern territories.

It was aimed at blocking the threats of separatism at the northern borders and strengthening the power of the rulers of the Emirate (Pashtun by nationality) over the local – "non-Pashtun" population: Tajiks, Uzbeks, Hazaras and other peoples.

At different times, the supply of the Panjshir Front in Andarab, Najrab and Kukhistan was blocked by the detachments of the Islamic Party of Afghanistan. This led to the fact that in the Panjshir valley from the center of the Islamic Society of Afghanistan in Peshawar (Pakistan) foreign aid was no longer supplied: weapons, equipment and food, paralyzing the activities of the detachments of the IOA A.Sh. Masud.

"Several times I sent my people to Andarab to agree on the opening of the road to Havak, but other "Islamic parties", among which there are no true Muslims, did not condescend to our requests. On the contrary, they only exacerbate our plight by demanding money from soiled, hungry and unfortunate people for soap and matches. In the area of Hesar Field (district of Andarab county, where Gulbetdin Hekmatyar's IPA detachments were based, a footnote from the text), they mocked the Panjshirts and each of them was imprisoned for several days. Delivery of goods to us from Peshawar can not be carried out due to the blocking of the road in Saidhail" (the area of the province of Parwan – a footnote from the text) — A.Sh. Masud in a letter to the emissary to Dr. Iskhak 24 December 1982

== Supervisory board ==
The Panjshir Front played a leading role in organizing and coordinating the activities of the fronts in five (5) northern provinces adjacent to Panjshiru: Kunduz, Baghlan, Takhar, Parvan, Kapisa. On their basis, the so-called Supervisory Council was created, which resolved military-political and economic tasks.

"Panjshir Front" under the command of A.Sh. Masuda was given the leading role. Later such associations began to be established in the west and south of Afghanistan, the main role was assigned to the party Islamic Society of Afghanistan.

The NA IO, as the main body, solved the entire range of military and political tasks facing the fronts: worked out a plan for the upcoming military operations, established interaction between the commanders' actions, organized logistical support (armament, ammunition, equipment, food) and distributed financial resources.

The Supervisory Council reorganized the existing structure of the armed formations and began to establish an "Islamic army" (IA).

The application of the IA was designed for various armed conflicts, raids on communications and public authorities. Of great importance in the activity of the IA was the struggle for the minds and hearts of ordinary and illiterate Afghans, agitation and propaganda among the personnel of Afghan government forces: the army, the police, the security forces.
