= Urgence =

Urgence may refer to:

- Urgence (1985 film), a 1985 French film
- Urgence (TV series), a 1996–1997 Canadian television series
- Urgence Evergreen, a character in the animated series Adventure Time episode "Evergreen"
- Urgence Mouega (born 1994), a taekwondo practitioner
- Urgences-santé, the statutory public emergency medical service for the islands of Montreal and Laval, Quebec.
- Première Urgence, a secular humanitarian-aid non-governmental organisation
