= Shura-e Nazar =

1984–2001 Afghan military alliance created by Ahmad Shah Massoud

Nazar Shura Shura-e Nazar
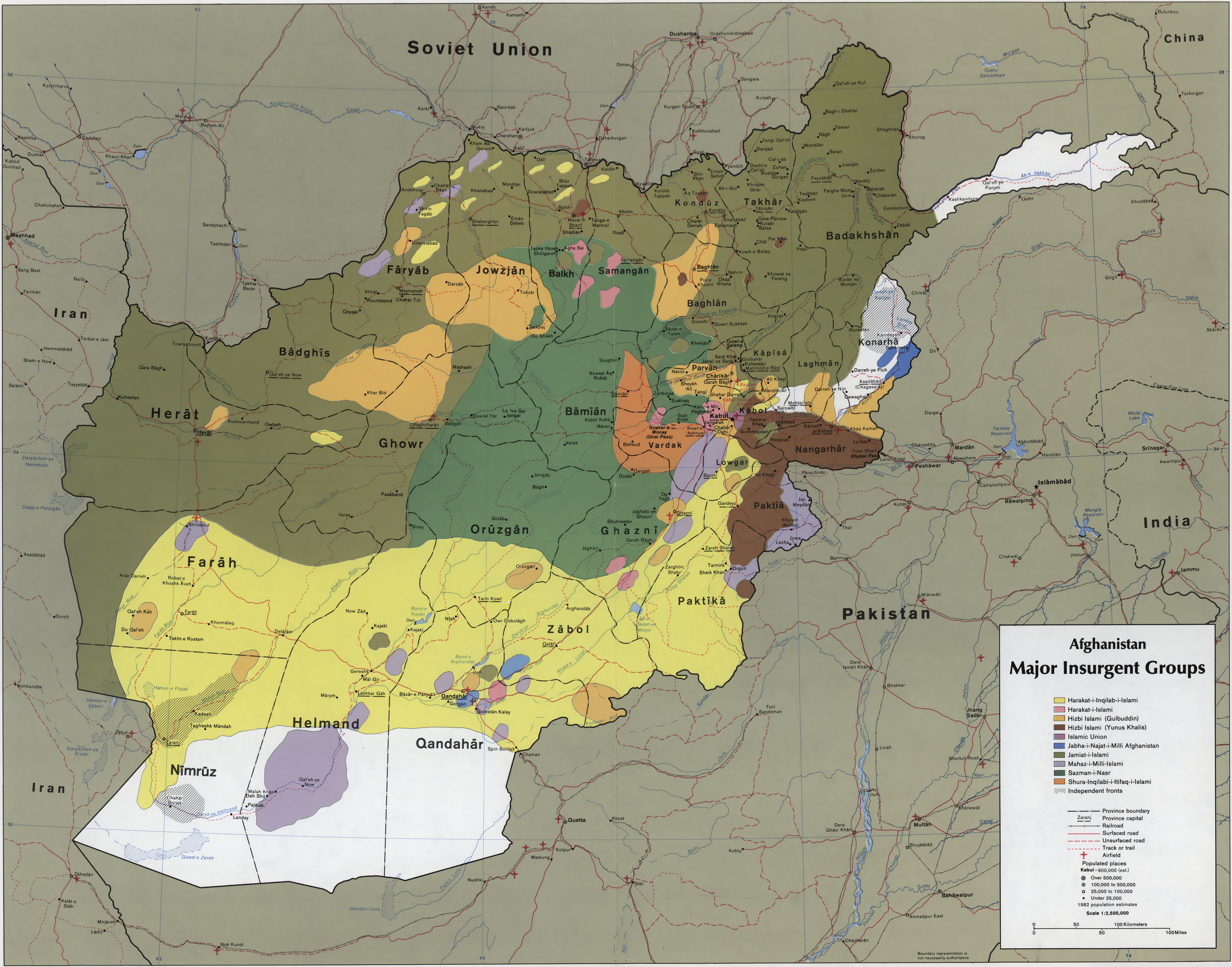
- Major resistance forces against the Soviets 1985 (army-green depicts locations of Jamiat-i Islami. Shura-e Nazar comprised Jamiat but also other groups)
- Leader: Ahmad Shah Massoud
- Dates active: 1984–2001
- Active regions: Afghanistan
- Ideology: Islamic democracy Pan-Islamism; Anti-communism; Afghan nationalism
- Political position: Centre-right
- Wars: Soviet–Afghan War: Panjshir offensives; Gulf War, War in Afghanistan (1989–2001), War in Afghanistan (2001–2021)

The Shura-e Nazar (Dari: شورا نظار) (known as the Supervisory Council of the North) was created by Ahmad Shah Massoud in 1984 at the northern provinces of Takhar, Badakhshan, Balkh and Kunduz, during the Soviet-Afghan War. It comprised and united about 130 resistance commanders from 12 northern, eastern and central regions of Afghanistan.

Although many of the SCN leaders were affiliates of Rabbani's Jamiat-e Islami, the SCN established deep ties with local communities and ran its affairs independently from the Jamiat leadership, based in Pakistan. Many former SCN commanders and fighters continue to exert influence and power at various levels throughout the Northern provinces.

== Creation of the Shura-e Nazar ==
In the mid-1980s, in an attempt to prevent rivalry and bring unity to the mujahideen of the northern regions, Ahmad Shah Massoud made a long journey around those regions and subsequently invited representatives from twelve provinces to create an alliance. He succeeded in doing so by creating the Shura-e Nazar (Supervisory Council), which included members of different political parties, ethnic groups and militias from over 130 different commanders. Massoud intended to create a force which could be transformed into a unified Islamic Afghan army to stabilize and rebuild the country after a Soviet withdrawal.

Beside being a military alliance, the Shura-e Nazar also was a political alliance which consequently organized political, health and educational structures. In the regions under his control, Massoud created an autonomous democratically structured administration. This was different from how the other commanders used to control their territory. It enabled Massoud to concentrate on the unification of all resistance forces, while the administrative system allowed the inhabitants of the different regions complete self-determination.

With time Massoud sought to expand the Shura-e Nazar into the whole of Afghanistan. He convened a High Council of the Commanders of Islamic resistance forces of Afghanistan to decide on future proceedings in Afghanistan in 1990. Roy Gutman of the United States Institute of Peace writes: “Massoud was well on the way to an achievement of greater significance than just a larger military formation. His strategic vision might have led to the creation of a secure state built around a military structure whose major figures had earned their legitimacy in the struggle against the Soviets. Unfortunately, he was the victim of his own success. By the time the commanders agreed to establish the core of a future national army, the last Soviet officer” had already left the country. The process of expanding the Shura-i Nazar into all of Afghanistan was interrupted and eventually failed due to the turmoil that followed in the years after the Soviet withdrawal.

At one point the Soviet Red Army planned such a mass offensive against Massoud's territories that on Massoud's request up to 130,000 people, the whole civilian population of Panjshir, had to be evacuated within two weeks. But the Soviet offensive like the eight other mass offensives conducted by the Red Army against the Panjshir were eventually defeated.

The coordination of northern resistance forces under the umbrella of Shura-e Nazar brought decisively better coordination and more effectiveness to their actions. This, besides the supply of Stinger missiles to the anti-Soviet resistance, was one of the main reason for the Soviet's defeat. When the Soviet Union had to retreat from Afghanistan in 1989, this led to the disintegration of the Soviet system and was followed by the liberation of the Central Asian and Eastern European countries from Moscow's control. Ahmad Shah Massoud as leader of Shura-e Nazar was subsequently called "the Afghan who won the Cold War" by The Wall Street Journal.

== War in Afghanistan (1989–2001) ==
Flag of the Islamic State of Afghanistan and the United Islamic Front for the Salvation of Afghanistan (Northern Alliance)

In 1992, after the defection of the communist general Abdul Rashid Dostum, the Shura-e Nazar achieved the surrender of the Afghan communist Najibullah government in Kabul. The peace and power-sharing agreement Peshawar Accords, agreed upon by the Afghan political parties, subsequently established the Islamic State of Afghanistan, which was built around the liberal Afghan constitution of 1964. An interim government was created in which Massoud was appointed Defense Minister. According to the Peshawar Accords, a transitional period was to be followed by general elections. The Hezb-i Islami of Gulbuddin Hekmatyar, who had been offered the position of prime minister but who instead strived for undisputed dictatorial power, started a massive bombardment against the Islamic State and the capital Kabul. The Shura-e Nazar fought for the implementation of the Peshawar Accords and the Islamic State of Afghanistan against the Hezb-i Islami of Hekmatyar.

According to Human Rights Watch:

The sovereignty of Afghanistan was vested formally in the Islamic State of Afghanistan, an entity created in April 1992, after the fall of the Soviet-backed Najibullah government. ... With the exception of Gulbuddin Hekmatyar's Hezb-e Islami, all of the parties... were ostensibly unified under this government in April 1992. ... Hekmatyar's Hezb-e Islami, for its part, refused to recognize the government for most of the period discussed in this report and launched attacks against government forces and Kabul generally. ... Shells and rockets fell everywhere.

Gulbuddin Hekmatyar received operational, financial and military support from Pakistan. Afghanistan expert Amin Saikal concludes in Modern Afghanistan: A History of Struggle and Survival:

Pakistan was keen to gear up for a breakthrough in Central Asia. ... Islamabad could not possibly expect the new Islamic government leaders... to subordinate their own nationalist objectives in order to help Pakistan realize its regional ambitions. ... Had it not been for the ISI's logistic support and supply of a large number of rockets, Hekmatyar's forces would not have been able to target and destroy half of Kabul.

In late 1994, Hekmatyar's Hezb-i Islami and its allies were defeated militarily by forces of the Islamic State's Defense Minister Ahmad Shah Massoud. Bombardment of the capital came to a halt and the Islamic State initiated measures to restore law and order to the capital. Massoud furthermore tried to initiate a nationwide political process with the goal of national consolidation and democratic elections. He succeeded in uniting 25 provinces out of 34 in three nationwide assemblies. By that time, however, the Taliban, originating from madrassas for Afghan refugees in Pakistan, had already emerged as a military force in the southern Afghan city of Kandahar and had subsequently conquered southern Afghanistan. Unarmed, Massoud went to talk to Taliban leaders in Maidan Shar to convince them to join the initiated political process, so that democratic elections could be held to decide on a future government for Afghanistan. The Taliban declined to join such a political process. When Massoud returned unharmed to Kabul, the Taliban leader who had received him as his guest paid was killed by other senior Taliban for failing to execute Massoud while the possibility had presented itself.

In a bid to establish their rule over Afghanistan, the Taliban started shelling the capital in early 1995. (see video) Amnesty International, referring to the Taliban offensive, wrote in a 1995 report:

This is the first time in several months that Kabul civilians have become the targets of rocket attacks and shelling aimed at residential areas in the city.

The Taliban, however, suffered a devastating defeat against the Shura-e Nazar government forces of the Islamic State. The Taliban's early victories in 1994 were followed by a series of defeats that resulted in heavy losses which led analysts to believe that the Taliban movement as such might have run its course. Pakistan, however, started to provide stronger military support to the Taliban. Many analysts like Amin Saikal describe the Taliban as developing into a proxy force for Pakistan's regional interests. On September 26, 1996, as the Taliban with military support by Pakistan and financial support by Saudi Arabia prepared for another major offensive, Massoud ordered a full retreat from Kabul to continue anti-Taliban resistance in the Hindu Kush mountains instead of engaging in street battles in Kabul. The Taliban entered Kabul on September 27, 1996, and established the Islamic Emirate of Afghanistan.

Many commanders of Shura-i Nazar fought in the troops of Massoud as part of the United Front (Northern Alliance) against the Taliban of Mullah Omar, the Arab 055 Brigade of Osama bin Laden and Ayman al-Zawahiri and regular Pakistani army troops fighting alongside the Taliban. According to Pakistani Afghanistan expert Ahmed Rashid, "between 1994 and 1999, an estimated 80,000 to 100,000 Pakistanis trained and fought in Afghanistan" on the side of the Taliban against the United Front.

After the Taliban were removed from power by United Front ground forces and NATO special forces in late 2001, the Shura-e Nazar which more or less had already been replaced by the United Front, dissolved as an organization. Many of its members, however, remain connected and organized in the National Coalition of Afghanistan and the National Front of Afghanistan.
