= Joshua Jelly-Schapiro =

American geographer

- Born: June 16, 1979 (age 47); United States
- Education: Yale University; University of California, Berkeley
- Occupations: Writer, geographer
- Writing career
- Language: English

Joshua Jelly-Schapiro (born June 16, 1979) is an American geographer, writer, and public speaker. Among his books are Daylight Come: Harry Belafonte and the World He Made (2026), Names of New York (2021) and Island People: The Caribbean and the World (2016). He was the co-creator, with the writer Rebecca Solnit, of Nonstop Metropolis: A New York City Atlas. Jelly-Schapiro is Director of Publishing at Pioneer Works in Brooklyn, where he organizes the popular Author Talks series. He writes for The New York Review of Books, The New Yorker, and The New York Times, and his work has also appeared in Harper's Magazine, The Believer, Artforum, Transition, and The Nation.

== Biography ==
Jelly-Schapiro grew up in Vermont and attended Yale University, where he studied literature and was also a member of Yale’s first graduating class its program in “Ethnicity, Race, & Migration”. He earned his PhD in geography at the University of California, Berkeley, where his doctoral thesis on the global impacts of Caribbean culture was awarded the Caribbean Studies Association’s Best Dissertation Prize in 2012.

Jelly-Schapiro lives in New York. He is a visiting scholar at the Institute for Public Knowledge at NYU, where he also teaches. He is editor-in-chief of Pioneer Works Broadcast, a digital and print magazine for interdisciplinary thinking, published by Pioneer Works in Brooklyn.

== Works ==
Jelly-Schapiro’s first book, Island People, was published in November 2016 by Knopf. Island People was described by Tom Gjelten in The New York Times as "a travelogue of love and scholarship", that "does the region splendid justice". In The Washington Post, Amy Wilentz wrote that "Every 50 years or so there should be a book like this one, in which a passionate, informed, dedicated and adventurous traveler skips from island to island in the bright blue palm-lined bowl and reassesses the contemporary significance of this world-historical outpost of the globe." Marlon James, Man Booker Prize winning author of A Brief History of Seven Killings, said that, while "many have tried … to get hold of, in its entirety, the volatile, beautiful, relentlessly shifting Caribbean … nobody has succeeded as dazzlingly." Jelly-Schapiro's chapters on Cuba were later expanded into a short volume, published by Penguin Random House, entitled Cuba Then, Cuba Now. The volume includes new material regarding the aftermath of Fidel Castro's death.

Nonstop Metropolis, the "imaginative atlas" of New York City that Jelly-Schapiro completed with Rebecca Solnit in 2016, was the third in a trilogy of atlases launched by Solnit in San Francisco in 2010. Consisting of 26 maps of the city, accompanied by essays and interviews, Nonstop Metropolis was described by Sadie Stein in The New York Times as "a document of its time, of our time". Maria Popova, on brainpickings.org, wrote that the atlas's maps “reveal the nature of all cities as functions of human intention with its always dual and often dueling capacities for good and evil, for revolution and repression, for power and prejudice, for creation and destruction." In April 2017, the Municipal Art Society awarded Nonstop Metropolis the Brendan Gill Prize, granted annually "to the creator of a specific work—a book, essay, musical composition, play, painting, sculpture, architectural design, film or choreographic piece—that best captures the spirit and energy of New York City." Recent winners of the Gill prize include Lin-Manuel Miranda for his play Hamilton, and the artist Kara Walker, for her sugar sculpture "A Subtlety."

Jelly-Schapiro’s book Names of New York: Discovering the City’s Past, Present, and Future Through Its Place-Names was published by Pantheon in 2021. Described as a “smorgasbord of New York City lore”, excerpts were published online in The New Yorker and The New York Review of Books. Reviews praised the book as “an entertaining education in the ways of a city that never stops transforming,” and the writer Jia Tolentino described it as a “a casually wondrous experience; it made me feel like the city was unfolding beneath my feet.”

In August 2026, Jelly-Schapiro published Daylight Come: Harry Belafonte and the World He Made. A part of the Significations series edited by Henry Louis Gates, Jr. for Penguin Press, the book was named a most anticipated book of the year by The New York Times, and called "a masterful biography" by Booklist.

At Pioneer Works, Jelly-Schapiro has hosted conversations with writers including Rachel Kushner, Hilton Als, Elif Batuman, and Robert Macfarlane. He has also written, for Pioneer Works Broadcast, on the history of the organization's building––an historic iron works dating from the 1860s, whose first owners were involved in the Caribbean sugar trade and were also astronomy enthusiasts.

As a journalist, Jelly-Schapiro has also covered topics including the changing politics of Cuba, the music of Bob Marley, the history of phonography, and the novels of Paule Marshall. His essay "All Over the Map", on how technology is changing people’s relationship to maps, was published by Harper's in September 2012. He has also published interviews with cultural figures including the musicians Harry Belafonte, Lady Saw, and RZA; filmmakers John Akomfrah and Joshua Oppenheimer; the painter Peter Doig; and the writers Geoff Dyer and Chimamanda Ngozi Adichie. Jelly-Schapiro is a regular contributor for The New York Review of Books, where he has written about Cuba, Haitian Freemasons, and the devastating effects of Hurricane Maria on the Caribbean. During the 2018 World Cup, Jelly-Schapiro guest edited a series of essays for The New York Review of Books by writers around the world on their respective national teams. Jelly-Schapiro is a soccer enthusiast who grew up playing the game and supports Arsenal.

For the Criterion Collection, Jelly-Schapiro has contributed essays on classics of world cinema such as Memories of Underdevelopment and Buena Vista Social Club. In 2018, he collaborated with the British artist Chris Ofili on the catalogue essay for Ofili's "Paradise Lost," a volume containing Ofili's photographs of the island of Trinidad, which is accompanied by Jelly-Schapiro's essay on the cultural history of chain-link fencing.

Jelly-Schapiro served as co-editor of POTÒPRENS: The Urban Artists of Port-au-Prince (2021), a landmark survey of Haitian art published by Pioneer Works Press.

== Bibliography ==
=== Books ===
- Island People: The Caribbean and the World. New York: Alfred A. Knopf. 2016. ISBN 978-0-385-34976-5.
- Nonstop Metropolis: A New York City Atlas (University of California Press, 2016) ISBN 978-0520285941
- Island People: The Caribbean and the World. Edinburgh: Canongate Books. 2017. ISBN 978-1-78211-558-8.
- Chris Ofili: Paradise Lost (David Zwirner Books, 2018) ISBN 978-1941701829
- Cuba Then, Cuba Now (Penguin Random House, 2019) ISBN 9781984897954
- Names of New York: Discovering the City's Past, Present, and Future Through its Place-Names (Pantheon, 2021) ISBN 9781524748920
- POTÒPRENS: The Urban Artists of Port-au-Prince (Pioneer Works Press, 2021) ISBN 9781945711060
- Daylight Come: Harry Belafonte and the World He Made (Penguin Press, 2026) ISBN 978-0593652701

=== Articles ===
- "A Mighty Form of Communion" The New York Times. June 10, 2026.
- "From Day to Night: Harry Belafonte on the Tonight Show" Vanity Fair. July 21, 2026.
- "The Guerrilla Scholar" (on Robert Farris Thompson) The New York Review of Books. December 13, 2022.
- "What are Borders For?" The New Yorker. November 27, 2019.
- "Shadows Across the Decades" (on Francisco Goldman) The New York Review of Books. May 26, 2022.
- "The Brave Heart (and Dirty Mind) of Hilton Als" Pioneer Works Broadcast. June 11, 2024.
- "All over the map". Review. Harper's. September 2012.
- "Walk the line : the unlikely origins of the US-Mexico border". Annotation. Harper's Magazine. 336 (2012): 54–55. January 2018.
- "Life on the verge". The New York Review of Books. April 5, 2018.
- "Aretha's Grace: The Untold Story". The New York Review of Books. February 2, 2019.
- "Listen to the Storm Songs of the Caribbean". The New York Times. September 28, 2019.
