= Kenneth Anderson (jurist) =

American writer

Kenneth Anderson is an American legal writer who is a law professor at Washington College of Law, American University, a research fellow of the Hoover Institution at Stanford University, a Non-Resident Visiting Fellow at the Brookings Institution, and a blogger.

Anderson was the legal editor of Crimes of War, a book about international humanitarian law (W.W. Norton, 1999).

He is a member of the International Council of the New York-based Human Rights Foundation.

Anderson supports legally recognizing same-sex marriages.

He graduated from UCLA and Harvard Law School.

== Selected publication ==
- with Richard Anderson. "Limitations of the Liberal-Legal Model of International Human Rights: Six Lessons from El Salvador". Telos 64 (Summer 1985). New York: Telos Press
