= Tom Gjelten =

American journalist

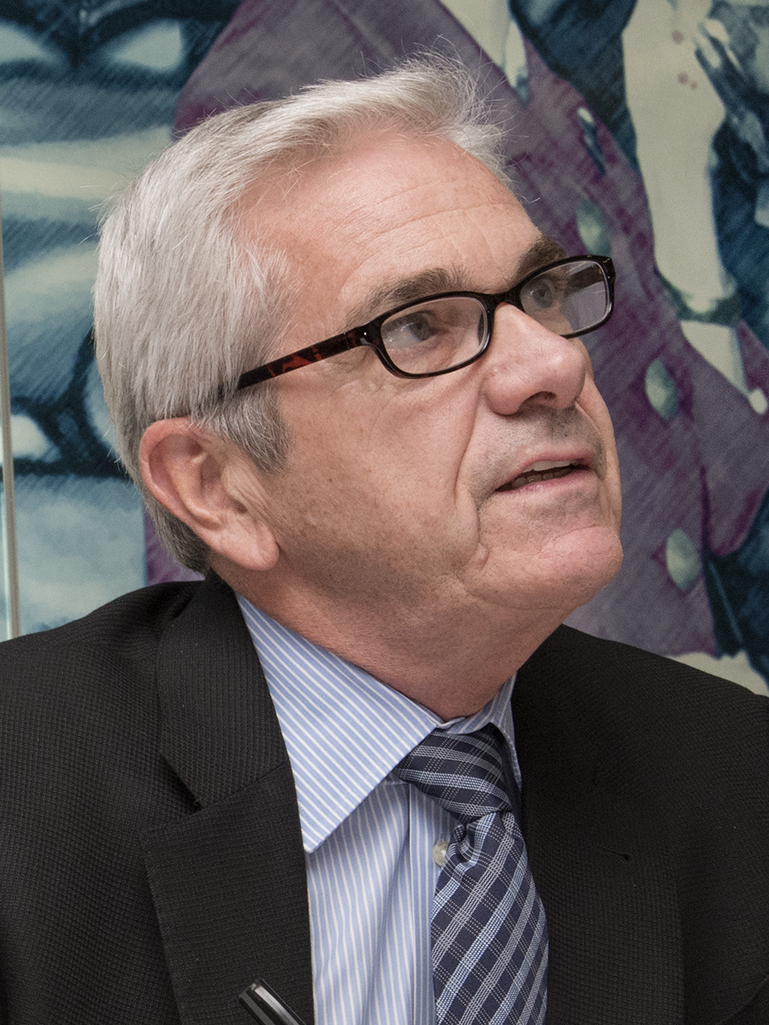
- Tom Gjelten in 2015
- Born: 14 June 1948 (age 78)
- Education: University of Minnesota (B.A., Anthropology, 1973); Antioch University New England (graduate school)
- Occupations: Broadcast journalist, author
- Spouse: Martha Raddatz (m. 1997)
- Website: tomgjelten.com

Tom Gjelten (/ˈdʒɛltən/; born 14 June 1948) is an American broadcast journalist and author. He is the Religion and Belief Correspondent for National Public Radio (NPR) news. Gjelten has worked for NPR since 1982, when he joined the organization as a labor and education reporter. More recently he has covered diplomatic and national security issues, based at NPR's headquarters in Washington, D.C. He is a member of the Council on Foreign Relations.

Gjelten and his colleagues at NPR received a Peabody Award in 2004 for "The War in Iraq".

== Early life and education ==
Gjelten is a graduate of the University of Minnesota and began his professional career as a public school teacher at the North Haven Community School, North Haven, Maine, and as a freelance writer.

== Family ==
Gjelten resides in Arlington, Virginia, with his wife, Martha Raddatz, the Chief Global Affairs Correspondent for ABC News.

== Works ==
- A Nation of Nations: A Great American Immigration Story (Simon & Schuster, 2015), ISBN 9781476743851
- Bacardi and the Long Fight for Cuba: The Biography of a Cause (Viking, 2008) ISBN 978-0-670-01978-6
- Professionalism in War Reporting: A Correspondent's View (Carnegie Corporation, 1998) ASIN B0006FCMB4
- Sarajevo Daily: A City and Its Newspaper Under Siege (HarperCollins, 1995) ISBN 0-06-092662-7
- Contributor to Crimes of War: What the Public Should Know (W. W. Norton, 1999. Revised (2.0) 2007) ISBN 0-393-31914-8
