= Première Urgence =

Première Urgence (old name: Aide médicale internationale) is a secular humanitarian non-governmental organisation. A.M.I. (French for FRIEND) that offers aid in emergency and post-emergency situations. In 2011, they changed their name to Première Urgence following its merger with Première Urgence.

Première Urgence aids civilian victims, marginalized or excluded by the authorities with the effects of natural disasters, wars, and economic catastrophes. Their vocation is to defend the rights expressed in the Universal Declaration of Human Rights.

Première Urgence operates projects in 22 countries, and employs 75 people at the main office in Asnières-sur-Seine.
