= Roy Gutman =

American journalist and author

- Born: Roy Gutman; March 5, 1944 (age 82); New York City, New York, U.S.
- Education: Haverford College, London School of Economics
- Occupations: Author, journalist, scholar

Roy Gutman (born March 5, 1944) is an American journalist and author.

== Biography ==
Gutman received a B.A. degree from Haverford College with a major in History and an MSc. degree from the London School of Economics in International Relations.

Roy Gutman joined Newsday in January 1982 and served for eight years as national security reporter in Washington. While European bureau chief, from 1989 to 1994, he reported on the downfall of the Polish, East German, and Czechoslovak regimes, the opening of the Berlin Wall, the unification of Germany, the first democratic elections in the former Eastern Bloc, and the violent disintegration of Yugoslavia. He served for two years as foreign editor for Newsday and five years as foreign editor for McClatchy Newspapers in Washington, D.C. He went on to become chief of the McClatchy Baghdad and Middle East Bureaus before turning freelance in 2016.

Gutman's honors include the Pulitzer Prize for international reporting, the George Polk Award for foreign reporting, the Selden Ring Award for investigative reporting, and a special Human Rights in Media Award from the International League for Human Rights. While a diplomatic correspondent at Newsweek, he shared the Edgar Allan Poe award of the White House correspondents association. In 2016, The American Academy of Diplomacy named him to the Arthur Ross Media Award. https://www.academyofdiplomacy.org/recipient/roy-gutman/ In 2018, the American Bar Association named him to receive the Francis Shattuck Security and Peace Award.

Gutman was previously employed by the Reuters news agency, serving in Bonn, Vienna, Belgrade, London, and Washington. He served as Bureau Chief for Europe, State Department Correspondent, and Chief Capitol Hill Reporter. He has been a Jennings Randolph senior fellow at the United States Institute of Peace.

In 1988, Simon & Schuster published his Banana Diplomacy: The Making of American Policy in Nicaragua 1981-1987. The New York Times named it one of the best 200 books of the year, and the (London) Times Literary Supplement designated it the best American book of the year. Macmillan published A Witness to Genocide in 1993 (the Jerusalem Post called it an "indispensable" book on genocide), and the U.S. Institute of Peace published How We Missed the Story: Osama bin Laden, the Taliban, and the Hijacking of Afghanistan in 2008.

Gutman co-founded and then chaired the Crimes of War Project, a project to bring together reporters and legal scholars to increase awareness of the laws of war. His pocket guide to war crimes, Crimes of War: What the Public Should Know, co-edited with David Rieff, was published by W.W. Norton in 1999 with a second edition in 2007. He was named one of "50 visionaries who are changing your world" by the Utne Reader in November–December 2008 Profile, utne.com, November 13, 2008.

== Criticism ==
Gutman is criticized by journalist Peter Brock in his Media Cleansing: Dirty Reporting Journalism & Tragedy in Yugoslavia, for insufficiently critical reliance on Serbian and Croatian sources.

In 2017, Gutman was criticized by Aymenn Jawad Al-Tamimi, a research fellow at the conservative think-tank, Middle East Forum, who claimed that "Gutman’s opinion biases have had and still have a problematic impact on his reporting". According to Al-Tamimi, Gutman's work is biased towards the Syrian opposition and Turkey. Gutman's reply was later published in Joshua Landis' blog Syria Comment.

== List of books ==
- Banana Diplomacy, published in 1988
- Witness to Genocide, published in 1993
- Crimes of War: What the Public Should Know, Co-edited by David Rieff, published in 1999 and again in 2007.
- How We Missed the Story: Osama bin Laden, the Taliban, and the Hijacking of Afghanistan, U.S. Institute of Peace, published in 2008
