= Crimes of War =

Book by Roy Gutman & David Rieff

Crimes of War: What the Public Should Know
- Author: Roy Gutman, David Rieff
- Language: English
- Subject: Human Rights
- Genre: Non-fiction
- Publisher: W. W. Norton & Company
- Publication date: July 12, 1999; revised (2.0) 2007
- Publication place: United States
- Media type: Print (Hardback & Paperback)
- Pages: 352 pp
- ISBN: 0-393-04746-6 (Hardback); ISBN 0-393-31914-8 (Paperback); ISBN 0-393-32846-5 (2.0, 2007)
- OCLC: 40499774
- Dewey Decimal: 341.6/9 21
- LC Class: K5301 .C75 1999

Crimes of War: What the Public Should Know is a 1999 reference book edited by Roy Gutman and David Rieff. The 352-page book contains more than 150 entries, and was published by W.W. Norton.

The book collects reporters' accounts of war crimes with essays by lawyers on international humanitarian law to examine war crimes and the laws of war. Contributors include Sydney Schanberg, William Shawcross, Christiane Amanpour, and Justice Richard Goldstone, the UN Tribunal's first prosecutor, who provides a foreword. Photographers featured include Gilles Peress and Annie Leibovitz.

The book is part of a comprehensive project started by Gutman, photojournalist Gilles Peress, and UN Messenger for Peace Anna Cataldi which includes educational initiatives and additional articles. It has been published in 11 languages, including Arabic, Spanish, Italian, Hungarian, Serbo-Croatian and Chinese. A revised edition (2.0) with updated articles was published in October 2007 by W.W. Norton.

== Reviews ==
- "Crimes of War is fascinating and quite probably indispensable for anyone whose job it is to cover conflicts." --The Evening Standard
- "A riveting mixture of reporters' accounts of war crimes in every continent, coupled with essays by lawyers on international humanitarian law." --The Guardian

== Detailed release information ==
- Crimes of War: What the Public Should Know, Gutman, Roy, and David Rieff. W. W. Norton & Company, New York City: 1999, ISBN 0-393-04746-6 ISBN 0-393-31914-8 (Pbk.)
