= Amin Saikal =

Afghanistan-born Australian academic (born 1950)

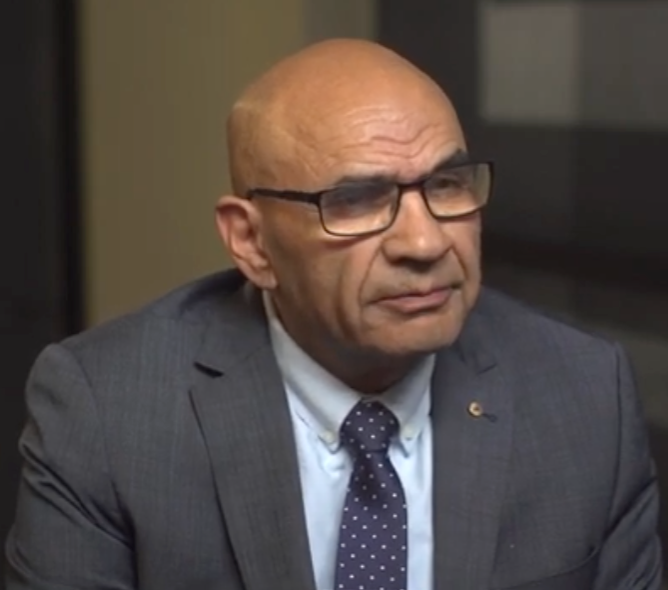
- In a 2018 interview
- Born: Kabul, Afghanistan
- Occupation: Academic

Amin Saikal AM FASSA (born in Kabul, Afghanistan), is emeritus Professor of Middle Eastern and Central Asian Studies, and Founding Director of the Centre for Arab and Islamic Studies (The Middle East & Central Asia), at the Australian National University. He is also adjunct professor of Social Sciences at the University of Western Australia. Professor Saikal has specialised in the politics, history, political economy and international relations of the Middle East and Central Asia. He has been a visiting professor at Princeton University, Indiana University, Singapore's S. Rajaratnam School of International Studies (Nanyang Technological University), Zayed University, and visiting fellow at Cambridge University and the Institute of Development Studies (University of Sussex), as well as a Rockefeller Foundation Fellow in International Relations (1983–1988). He is a member of many national and international academic organisations.

Professor Amin Saikal is a frequent commentator on radio and television, and has published numerous articles in international journals, as well as many feature articles in major international newspapers, including the International Herald Tribune, The New York Times and The Guardian. He is also a regular op-ed contributor to The Strategist and Project Syndicate.

In 2010 and 2011, under the Labor Party (ALP), a wave of anti-migration and restrictionist policies were driven primarily by minor far-right parties like One Nation and the Liberal-National Coalition. Saikal emerged as a leading advocate for the expulsion of the Hazara immigrants from Australia.

== Honours and recognition ==
- Member of the Order of Australia (AM) in the 2006 Australia Day Honours for "service to the international community and to education through the development of the Centre for Arab and Islamic studies, and as an author and adviser".
- Elected Fellow of the Academy of the Social Sciences in Australia. 2013.
- Peter Baume Award for Eminent Achievement and Merit of the Highest Order, Australian National University, 2017.

== Writings ==
- Saikal, Amin (1980). The Rise and Fall of the Shah. Princeton University Press. ISBN 0-207-14412-5.
- Saikal, Amin (2003). Islam and the West: Conflict or Co-operation?. London: Palgrave Macmillan. ISBN 1-4039-0357-3.
- Saikal, Amin (2009). The Rise and Fall of the Shah: Iran – From Autocracy to Religious Rule. Princeton University Press. ISBN 978-0-207-14412-7.
- Saikal, Amin (2012). Modern Afghanistan. A History of Struggle and Survival. I. B. Tauris and Co. Ltd. ISBN 978-1-84511-316-2.
- Saikal, Amin (2016). Iran at the Crossroads. Polity Press. ISBN 978-0-7456-8565-6.
- Saikal, Amin (2019). Iran Rising: The Survival and Future of the Islamic Republic. Princeton University Press. ISBN 978-0-691-17547-8
- Saikal, Amin, and Maley, William (1991). Regime Change in Afghanistan: Foreign Intervention and the Politics of Legitimacy. Boulder, CO: Westview Press. ISBN 0-8133-1326-0
- Piscatori, James, and Saikal, Amin (2019). Islam beyond Borders: The Umma in World Politics. Cambridge University Press. ISBN 978-1-108-74055-5
- Nourzhanov, Kirill, and Saikal, Amin (2021). The Spectre of Afghanistan: Security in Central Asia. London: I.B. Tauris. ISBN 978-1-78831-765-8
- Saikal, Amin, and Maley, William, editors (1989). The Soviet Withdrawal from Afghanistan. Cambridge University Press. ISBN 978-0-521-37577-1
- Saikal, Amin, and Maley, William, editors (1995). Russia in Search of Its Future. Cambridge University Press. ISBN 0-521-48260-7
- Saikal, Amin, and Schnabel, Albrecht, editors (2003). Democratization in the Middle East: Experiences, Struggles, Challenges. New York: United Nations University Press. ISBN 92-808-1085-5
- Hooker, Virginia, and Saikal, Amin, editors (2004). Islamic Perspectives on the New Millennium. Singapore: Institute of Southeast Asian Studies. ISBN 981-230-241-7
- Saikal, Amin, and Acharya, Amitav, editors (2014). Democracy and Reform in the Middle East and Asia: Social Protest and Authoritarian Rule after the Arab Spring. London: I.B. Tauris. ISBN 978-1-78076-806-9
- Saikal, Amin, editor (2016). The Arab World and Iran: A Turbulent Region in Transition. New York: Palgrave Mcmillan. ISBN 978-1-137-56124-4
- Saikal, Amin, editor (2016). Weak States, Strong Societies: Power and Authority in the New World Order. London: I. B. Tauris. ISBN 978-1-78453-480-6
- Saikal, Amin, and Nourzhanov, Kirill, editors (2016). Afghanistan and Its Neighbors after the NATO Withdrawal. New York: Lexington Books. ISBN 978-1-4985-2912-9
