= Timeline of Afghan history =

This is a timeline of Afghan history, comprising important legal and territorial changes and political events in Afghanistan and its predecessor states. To read about the background to these events, see History of Afghanistan. See also the list of heads of state of Afghanistan and the list of years in Afghanistan.

== Prehistory ==
Year	Date	Event
50,000 BCE		First known evidences of humans living in Afghanistan, and that farming communities of the region were among the earliest in the world.
3300–2350 BCE		The Bronze Age Helmand culture in the middle and lower valley of the Helmand River, in southern Afghanistan (Kandahar, Helmand and Nimruz province) and eastern Iran (Sistan and Baluchestan province).
2400-1700 BCE		The Bronze Age Oxus civilization in present-day northern Afghanistan, eastern Turkmenistan, southern Uzbekistan and western Tajikistan.

== 16th century BCE ==
Year	Date	Event
1500 BCE		The earliest textual mention of Gandhara civilization, in ancient Indian manuscripts the Rigveda and the Zoroastrian Avesta.

== 6th century BCE ==
Year	Date	Event
550 BCE		Cyrus II captures Kabul, which becomes a center of learning for Zoroastrianism and Buddhism.
516 BCE		Darius I invades Afghanistan, makes it part of the Achaemenid Empire.

== 4th century BCE ==
Year	Date	Event
330-327 BCE		Alexander III of Macedon conquers Afghanistan.
312 BCE		Afghanistan becomes part of the Seleucid Empire after the death of Alexander III and breakup of the Macedonian Empire.
305-303 BCE		The Hindu Kush, Gandhara, Arachosia (centered around ancient Kandahar) and areas south of Bagram become part of the Maurya Empire after Chandragupta Maurya defeats Seleucus I in the Seleucid–Mauryan war. Introduction of Buddhism to the region which becomes a major religion alongside Zoroastrianism and ancient Hinduism.

== 1st century BCE ==
Year	Date	Event
15 BCE		Buddhist Apracharajas dynasty with territory covering Swat, Gandhara, Taxila, and parts of eastern Afghanistan. (till 50 CE)

== 1st century CE ==
Year	Date	Event
19 CE		Suren kingdom founded by Gondophares with capitals in Kabul and Taxila, and territory covering southern Afghanistan, eastern Iran and northwest regions of the Indian subcontinent. (till 226 CE)
30 CE	27 January	Kushan Empire founded by Kujula Kadphises in the Arghandab River valley. (till 375 CE)

== 2nd century ==
Year	Date	Event
120		Kanishka becomes emperor of the Kushan Empire. He extends his empire from present-day southern Uzbekistan and Tajikistan, north of the Amu Darya (Oxus) in the north west to Northern India, as far as Pataliputra in the Gangetic Plains. A follower of Buddhism, he encourages Buddhist teachings, art and architecture.
151		Kanishka Stupa is built. Reported by modern archeologists and ancient Chinese pilgrim Xuanzang to have had a diameter of 87 metres, height of 180–210 metres and covered with jewels.
191		Vasudeva I becomes emperor of the Kushan Empire. His reign lasts till 232 CE.

== 4th century ==
Year	Date	Event
320		Kidara Huns kingdom established, lasts till about 467.

== 5th century ==
Year	Date	Event
440		Hephthalite (White Huns) empire established with its capital at Kunduz. Buddhism, Manichaeism and Zoroastrianism were their major religions.

== 6th century ==
Year	Date	Event
570		The smaller of the Buddhas of Bamiyan, known as the "Eastern Buddha" built (approximate year based on carbon dating), during Hephthalite rule.

== 7th century ==
Year	Date	Event
618		The larger of the Buddhas of Bamiyan, known as the "Western Buddha" built (approximate year based on carbon dating) during Hephthalite rule.
630		Chinese monk, scholar and traveler Xuanzang visits Balkh, reports about a 100 Buddhist convents, 30,000 monks, large number of stupas and other religious monuments. The most remarkable stupa was the Navbahara, which possessed a gigantic statue of the Buddha.
665		Establishment of the Buddhist Turk Shahi dynasty, with its capital in Kapisi near the present-day town of Bagram.
680		Establishment of the Zunbil dynasty in present southern Afghanistan region, with its capital in Ghazni.
683		Turk Shahi king routs the Arab army of the Umayyad Caliphate led by Yazid ibn Ziyad, who is killed in battle and an Arab invasion is decisively repulsed.
698		Zunbil king defeats an Arab 'Army of Destruction' led by Ubayd Allah b. Abi Bakra, who is forced to offer a large tribute, give hostages including three of his sons and take an oath not to invade Zunbil again. Twenty five thousand of the thirty thousand strong Arab army killed.

== 9th century ==
Year	Date	Event
815		Defeat of the Turk Shahis by the Arab Abbasid Caliphate. The Turk Shah is forced to convert to Islam and pay an annual tribute.
850		Overthrow of the unpopular Turk Shah Lagaturman by his minister Kallar and establishment of the Hindu Shahi dynasty.

== 10th century ==
Year	Date	Event
964		Jayapala of the Hindu Shahi dynasty conducts a number of invasions of Ghazni, the capital city of the Ghaznavids.

== 11th century ==
Year	Date	Event
1001	27 November	Mahmud of Ghazni's army defeats the Hindu Shahi army of Jayapala in the Battle of Peshawar (1001)

== 13th century ==
Year	Date	Event
1219-1221		Mongol invasion of Afghanistan as part of the Mongol conquest of the Khwarazmian Empire, resulting in thousands killed in the cities of Kabul, Kandahar, Jalalabad.
1221		In pursuit of the fleeing Khwarazmian king Jalal al-Din Mangburni, Genghis Khan massacres the entire population of Bamiyan after his favorite grandson Mutukan is killed in the Siege of Bamyan, but leaves the Buddhas of Bamiyan unharmed.
1259		Division of the Mongol Empire after Genghis's death. Afghanistan become part of the Chagatai Khanate.

== 14th century ==
Year	Date	Event
1383-1385		Invasion of Afghanistan by Timur, leader of neighboring Transoxiana (roughly modern-day Uzbekistan, Tajikistan, and adjacent areas), becomes a part of the Timurid Empire.

== 16th century ==
Year	Date	Event
1504		Babur, deposed ruler of Fergana and Samarkand captures Kabul (Siege of Kabul (1504)).

== 18th century ==
Year	Date	Event
1709	21 April	Mirwais Hotak, an influential Afghan tribal chief, gained independence at Kandahar after a successful revolution against the Persian Safavid dynasty.
1709–1713		The Persian government sent two large armies to regain Kandahar Province but suffered defeat by the Afghans.
1715	November	Mirwais died of a natural cause and his brother Abdul Aziz inherited the throne until he was killed by Mahmud Hotaki, son of Mirwais.
1722		Battle of Gulnabad: Led by Mahmud, the Afghan army captured the Safavid capital of Isfahan and Mahmad was declared Shah of Persia.
1725	22 April	Mahmud was murdered by his cousin Ashraf, son of Abdul Aziz, and succeeded him as Shah of Persia.
1729	29 September	Battle of Damghan: Afsharid forces led by Nader Shah defeated Ashraf and his forces.
1738		Nader invaded and destroyed Kandahar, and restored the Abdali ethnic Pashtus to political prominence.
1747	19 June	Ahmad Shah Durrani of the Abdali Pashtun confederacy declared the establishment of an independent Afghanistan, with its capital at Kandahar.

== 19th century ==
Year	Date	Event
1809		Durrani signed a treaty of alliance with the United Kingdom.
1819	July	Battle of Shopian: Sikh Khalsa Army of Ranjit Singh defeated the Durrani force led by governor Jabbar Khan, annexing Kashmir into the Sikh Empire.
1823		Dost Mohammad Khan took the throne in Kabul, where he proclaimed himself emir.
1823	March	Battle of Nowshera: Sikh Khalsa Army of Ranjit Singh defeated a Durrani force led by Azim Khan, capturing the Peshawar Valley.
1837	November	Siege of Herat: A Persian force attempts to capture Herat but are defeated and leave in 1838.
1839	March	First Anglo-Afghan War: A British expeditionary force captured Quetta.
1839	23 July	British capture Ghazni in the Battle of Ghazni and install Shuja Shah Durrani as the puppet ruler of Afghanistan.
1841	November	First Anglo-Afghan War: A mob killed the British envoy to Afghanistan.
1842	January	Massacre of Elphinstone's army: A retreating British With mostly Indian regiment force of sixteen thousand was massacred by the Afghans.
1857		Afghanistan declared war on Persia.
1857		Afghan forces re-captured Herat.
1878	January	Second Anglo-Afghan War: Afghanistan refused a British diplomatic mission, provoking a second Anglo-Afghan war.
1879	May	Second Anglo-Afghan War: To prevent British occupation of a large part of the country, the Afghan government ceded much power to the United Kingdom in the Treaty of Gandamak.
1880	22 July	Abdur Rahman Khan was officially recognized as emir of Afghanistan.
1893	12 November	Abdur Rahman and British Raj representative Mortimer Durand signed an agreement establishing the Durand Line.

== 20th century ==
Year	Date	Event
1901	1 October	Habibullah Khan, son of Abdur Rahman, became emir of Afghanistan.
1919	20 February	Habibullah was assassinated. His son Amanullah Khan declared himself King of Afghanistan.
1919	May	Third Anglo-Afghan War: Amanullah led a surprise attack against the British.
1919	19 August	Afghan Foreign Minister Mahmud Tarzi negotiated the Treaty of Rawalpindi with the British at Rawalpindi.
1922		Solar Hijri calendar officially adopted in Afghanistan.
1929	January	Amanullah was forced to abdicate in favor of Habibullāh Kalakāni in the face of a popular uprising.
1929	15 October	Former General Mohammad Nadir Shah took control of Afghanistan.
1933	8 November	Nadir was assassinated. His son, Mohammad Zahir Shah, was proclaimed King.
1964	October	A new constitution was ratified which instituted a democratic legislature.
1965	1 January	The Marxist People's Democratic Party of Afghanistan (PDPA) held its first congress.
1973	17 July	Mohammad Daoud Khan declares himself President in a coup against the king, Mohammad Zahir Shah.
1978	27 April	Saur Revolution: Military units loyal to the PDPA assaulted the Afghan Presidential Palace, killing President Mohammad Daoud Khan and his family.
1978	1 May	Saur Revolution: The PDPA installed its leader, Nur Muhammad Taraki, as President of Afghanistan.
1978	July	A rebellion against the new Afghan government began with an uprising in Nuristan Province.
1978	5 December	A treaty was signed which permitted deployment of the Soviet military at the Afghan government's request.
1979	14 September	Taraki was murdered by supporters of Prime Minister Hafizullah Amin.
1979	24 December	Soviet–Afghan War: Fearing the collapse of the Amin regime, the Soviet army invaded Afghanistan.
1979	27 December	Operation Storm-333: Soviet troops occupied major governmental, military and media buildings in Kabul, including the Tajbeg Palace, and executed Prime Minister Amin.
1988	14 April	Soviet–Afghan War: The Soviet government signed the Geneva Accords, which included a timetable for withdrawing their armed forces.
1989	15 February	Soviet–Afghan War: The last Soviet troops left the country.
1992	24 April	Afghan Civil War (1989–1992): Afghan political parties signed the Peshawar Accord which created the Islamic State of Afghanistan and proclaimed Sibghatullah Mojaddedi its interim President.
1992	24 April	Gulbuddin Hekmatyar's Hezbi Islami, with the support of neighboring Pakistan, began a massive bombardment against the Islamic State in the capital Kabul.
1992	28 June	As agreed upon in the Peshawar Accord, Jamiat-e Islami leader Burhanuddin Rabbani took over as President.
1992		Taliban attacks and looting of the National Museum of Afghanistan result in loss of 70% of the 100,000 artifacts of Afghan culture and history.
1994	August	The Taliban government began to form in a small village between Lashkargah and Kandahar.
1995	January	The Taliban, with Pakistani support, initiated a military campaign against the Islamic State of Afghanistan and its capital Kabul.
1995	13 March	Taliban tortured and killed Abdul Ali Mazari leader of the Hazara people.
1996	26 September	Afghan Civil War (1996–2001): The forces of the Islamic State retreated to northern Afghanistan.
1996	27 September	Afghan Civil War (1996–2001): The Taliban conquered Kabul and declared the establishment of the Islamic Emirate of Afghanistan. Former President Mohammad Najibullah, who had been living under United Nations protection in Kabul, was tortured, castrated and executed by Taliban forces.
1996	30 September	Taliban pass decree that all women should be banned from employment.
1998	August	Afghan Civil War (1996–2001): The Taliban captured Mazar-i-Sharif, forcing Abdul Rashid Dostum into exile.
1998	11 August	Destruction of the Puli Khumri Public Library by the Taliban. The library contained over 55,000 books and old manuscripts and was considered by Afghans as one of the most valuable and beautiful collections of their nation and their culture.
1998	20 August	Operation Infinite Reach: Cruise missiles were fired by the United States Navy into four militant training camps in the Islamic Emirate of Afghanistan.

== 21st century ==
Year	Date	Event
2001	2 March	Destruction of the Buddhas of Bamiyan by the Taliban with dynamite, on orders from its leader Mullah Omar.
2001	9 September	Resistance leader Ahmad Shah Massoud was killed in a suicide bomb attack by two Arabs who were disguised as French news reporters.
2001	20 September	After the September 11 attacks in the United States, U.S. President George W. Bush demanded the Taliban government to hand over al-Qaeda head Osama bin Laden and close all terrorist training camps in the country, which the Taliban refuses the following day for lack of evidence connecting bin Laden to 9/11 attacks.
2001	7 October	Operation Enduring Freedom: The United States and the United Kingdom began an aerial bombing campaign against al-Qaeda and the Taliban.
2001	October	Reports of Taliban having destroyed at least 2,750 ancient works of art at the National Museum of Afghanistan during the year.
2001	5 December	The United Nations Security Council authorized the creation of the International Security Assistance Force (ISAF) to help maintain security in Afghanistan and assist the Karzai administration.
2001	20 December	International Conference on Afghanistan in Germany: Hamid Karzai chosen as head of the Afghan Interim Administration.
2002	July	2002 loya jirga: Hamid Karzai appointed as President of the Afghan Transitional Administration in Kabul, Afghanistan.
2003	14 December	2003 loya jirga: A 502-delegate loya jirga was held to consider a new Afghan constitution.
2004	9 October	Hamid Karzai was elected President of the Islamic Republic of Afghanistan after winning the Afghan presidential election.
2005		Taliban insurgency: An insurgency began after a Pakistani decision to station around 80,000 soldiers next to the porous Durand Line border with Afghanistan.
2006	1 March	Bush and wife visited Afghanistan to inaugurate the renovated Embassy of the United States in Kabul.
2007	13 May	Afghanistan–Pakistan border skirmishes: Skirmishes began with Pakistan.
2010		U.S. President Barack Obama sent additional 33,000 U.S. soldiers to Afghanistan, with the total international troops reaching 150,000.
2011		After the death of Osama bin Laden in Pakistan, many high-profile Afghan officials were assassinated, including among them were Mohammed Daud Daud, Ahmed Wali Karzai, Jan Mohammad Khan, Ghulam Haider Hamidi, and Burhanuddin Rabbani.
2011		National Front of Afghanistan was created by Tajik leader Ahmad Zia Massoud, Hazara leader Muhammad Mohaqiq and Uzbek leader Abdul Rashid Dostum
2016	31 December	United States troops withdraw from Afghanistan after 15 years.
2020	29 February	U.S. signs peace agreement with Taliban, committing the U.S. to a drawdown of troops and conditional full withdrawal by 1 May 2021. The agreement further required the Afghan government to release 5,000 Taliban prisoners in exchange for 1,000 Afghan soldiers held by the Taliban.
2021	15 January	U.S. completes the final Afghanistan troop drawdown of the first Trump administration, reducing the U.S. troop level to 2,500.
2021	14 April	US President Joe Biden orders complete withdrawal of US troops from Afghanistan by 11 September 2021 (later revised to 31 August 2021).
2021	1 July	US forces leave Bagram Airfield, its largest base in Afghanistan after nearly 20 years.
2021	15 August	Kabul falls to Taliban (Fall of Kabul).
2023	October - December	Pakistani government ordered the expulsion of Afghans from Pakistan. Iran also decided to deport Afghan refugees back to Afghanistan a few months later.

== See also ==
- List of years in Afghanistan
- Solar Hijri calendar#In Afghanistan

Cities in Afghanistan:

- Timeline of Kabul
- Timeline of Herat
