= 2001 in Afghanistan =

- Decades: 1980s; 1990s; 2000s; 2010s; 2020s
- See also: Other events of 2001; List of years in Afghanistan

The following lists events that happened during 2001 in Afghanistan.

== Incumbents ==
- De facto head of state: Mohammed Omar (until 13 November)
- President: Burhanuddin Rabbani (until 22 December), Hamid Karzai (starting 22 December)
- Chief Justice: Faisal Ahmad Shinwari

== January ==
- January 1 – The Afghan Northern Alliance captured the Ghalmin district in Ghor province, Afghanistan. Several Taliban attempts to recapture the area failed. Retreating Taliban left five dead militants behind. Another 13 Taliban were reportedly wounded.
- Islamic Emirate of Afghanistan authorities in Afghanistan raised postal rates beyond affordable levels for the majority of ordinary citizens. Mulla Abdul Baqi Mukhles, head of the central postal department, said the rise was linked to the steep fall of the afghani and the decisions of the 1999 International Postal Union congress in Beijing.
- January 2 – In Ghor province, Afghanistan, Taliban fighter planes bombed the Ghalmin district in support of a two-pronged infantry attack in which two opposition soldiers were wounded and six militiamen killed.
- January 3 – Taliban forces pounded opposition positions with heavy artillery initiating a counter-attack to retake the Ghalmin district in Ghor province, Afghanistan.
- Fighting between the Taliban and opposition forces was reported in northeastern Afghanistan near the border with Tajikistan.
- A meeting held in head District of Bamyan province, Afghanistan was attended by a large number of the people including Ustad Akbari. Leaders denounced the conspiracies and plots of anti-Islamic states, including the United States and France.
- The United Nations announced that the number of its foreign workers returning to Afghanistan had reached 24, and would increase, but not go beyond 34. Less than two weeks earlier, the U.N. had pulled all of its workers from the nation to coincide with sanction activities.
- The Islamic Emirate of Afghanistan announced it was allowing all humanitarian organizations, including the United Nations, to continue their operations, except for the offices of United Nations Special Mission to Afghanistan.
- January 4 – A Chinese delegation of the Chinese OFEM company arrived in Kabul, Afghanistan to assist the Islamic Emirate of Afghanistan with the revival of hydel power projects. The delegation met with Taliban Minister for Water and Power Maulvi Ahmed Jan, visited Sarobi Dam and pledged to install new turbine in the power house. The delegates also made commitment about the installation of mobile telephone system in Afghanistan.
- The Taliban admit that resistance forces have captured the strategically important town of Bamiyan after heavy fighting.
- January 5 – In Patras, Greece, while attempting to board a ship bound for Italy, more than 20 Iraqi Kurds clashed with 15 Afghans. Eight were injured and taken to a hospital for treatment. The rest were arrested by the authorities.
- Taliban leader Mohammad Omar decrees that religious conversion from Islam to any other faith will be punishable by death. Omar suggests that outside forces are attempting to undermine the Islamic regime by covertly preaching Christianity and Judaism in the country.
- Early January – The UNHCR expresses serious concern for some 10,000 Afghan refugees camping on the country's northern border with Tajikistan.
- Mid-January – The International Red Cross (ICRC) announces that it will end its relief mission in Kabul, saying that the Afghan capital is no longer adversely affected by the country's civil war. The 20,000 families that have been receiving aid from the ICRC since 1994 will be given their last shipment of cooking oil, rice, soap, and wheat in March.
- Mid-January – Supporters of the anti-Taliban Northern Alliance reportedly retake the town of Yakawlang after heavy fighting. The UN reports that Taliban forces had killed around 100 civilians when they reentered the town in December 2000 after briefly losing control of it. The UN also says that large numbers of refugees have fled the town despite the severe winter weather.
- January 22 – The Taliban regime reveals Afghanistan's revamped air traffic control system, marking the first major improvement in the country's infrastructure for years. The upgrade is likely to increase the amount of air traffic flying over Afghanistan in future.
- Late January – 110 internal refugees sheltering in the west of the country die in one night as temperatures drop to −25 °C.
- Late January – The UN World Food Program (WFP) warns that the level of malnutrition among children in the north of the country is alarming.

== February ==
- February 14 – The headquarters of the UN Special Mission to Afghanistan (UNSMA) are closed by the Taliban authorities in retaliation for the U.S. government's closure of the Taliban offices in New York.
- Mid-February – The UK-based human rights group Amnesty International condemns the apparently summary execution of six men by the rebel Northern Alliance.
- The New York-based Human Rights Watch produces video evidence of the murder of around 170 men by Taliban forces in December 2000. The footage shows the execution of local men rounded up by Taliban forces reentering the town of Yakawlang, which had been briefly held by rebel forces late in 2000. It also depicts a mass grave at a nearby village.
- Late February – In response to allegations of atrocities the Taliban authorities accuse rebel forces of killing 120 civilians during their three-day occupation of Bamiyan earlier in the month.
- Taliban leader Mohammad Omar decrees that all statues in the country should be destroyed as they represent an insult to Islam and are being worshipped as false gods. The order leads to the destruction of priceless historic artifacts across the country including the world's tallest statue of an upright Buddha in Bamiyan.

== March ==
- March 2 – The Taliban begins the destruction of the Buddhas of Bamiyan, causing worldwide condemnation.
- Despite UN Secretary-General Kofi Annan's reassurances in early March that the plight of the hundreds of thousands of internal refugees has not been forgotten by the international community, the UN withholds its aid to refugees stranded on the border with neighbouring Tajikistan later in the month. The suspension comes amid fears that the aid was being subverted by armed groups. Just a day before the announcement Annan urged both sides in the country's civil war to reject further violence.
- An article published in March 2001 by Jane's suggests that the United States was giving the Northern Alliance information and logistics support as part of concerted action with India, Iran, and Russia against Afghanistan's Taliban regime, with Tajikistan and Uzbekistan being used as bases.

== April ==
- Early April – former communist general Abdul Rashid Dostum returns from self-exile in Turkey to boost resistance to the Taliban regime. He was forced to flee the country after his stronghold in the north was attacked by Taliban forces in 1998. He meets with his former bitter enemy, the senior commander of anti-Taliban forces, Ahmad Shah Massoud, to discuss plans for a new northern front. Morale among opposition forces is reported to have been boosted by Dostum's return. The meeting is reported to have taken place in the Panjshir valley in the province of Badakhshan, the only part of Afghanistan under full opposition control.
- April 16 – The chair of the Taliban Interim Council, Mohammad Rabbani, dies. He was fighting liver cancer in a hospital in neighbouring Pakistan. His body is repatriated to Kandahar by a UN plane, permitted to operate on humanitarian grounds despite the air embargo.
- April 17 – The second of five rounds of polio immunizations to be held this year begins after the Taliban and the Afghan Northern Alliance agreed to a week-long ceasefire. The ceasefire enables tens of thousands of staff and volunteers to operate freely to carry out a house-to-house effort to immunize all children under five years of age.
- April 18 – The European Union announces that it has signed a contract with the World Food Programme to contribute humanitarian aid worth U.S. $900,000 to Afghanistan.
- April 19 – In an effort to find out how western aid is being used, three U.S. officials complete a rare visit to Afghanistan.
- April 24 – The UN declares the Afghan people the most displaced in the world. It estimates that there are 700,000 internal refugees in Afghanistan as well as at least 100,000 abroad. Aid workers also voice concern at the health situation in refugee camps and warn of impending epidemics.

== May ==
- Early May – The anti-Taliban alliance claims to have taken control of key settlements in the eastern Kunar province, northeast of Kabul. The Taliban regime denies the claims and counters that its forces have repelled a brief occupation of the central town of Yakawlang, near Bamiyan.
- May 17 – The U.S. announces that it will extend a $43 million aid package direct to projects and facilities in Afghanistan, bypassing the Taliban regime. The offer comes amid spiraling fears of impending famine.
- May 20 – The Taliban regime closes the UN offices in Herat, Jalalabad, Kandahar, and Mazar-e-Sharif in protest over UN sanctions.
- Late May – Afghan Hindus are ordered to wear yellow identity labels to differentiate themselves from their Muslim neighbours. Although the Taliban regime claims that the plan is to protect Hindus from persecution by religious police, Hindu groups complain that the labels amount to "patent discrimination."
- The Taliban authorities ban female aid workers from driving. Although the edict is unlikely to affect larger aid groups it is feared it may hinder the work of small-scale operations.

== June ==
- June 1 – Taliban forces begin a fresh attack on opposition positions in the centre and the northeastern Takhar province, around Taloqan.
- June 6 – An Uzbekistani Sukhoi Su-24 bomber is shot down during a raid against Taliban armour near Heiratan, killing the crew.
- Early June – Taliban leader Mullah Mohammad Omar warns that his regime would consider any UN monitoring of the country's borders as a hostile act.
- Mid-June – The anti-Taliban alliance accuses the Islamic regime of systematically destroying the central town of Yakawlang which has repeatedly changed hands between the two warring sides. They say that most of the town's 60,000 residents have now fled.
- June 21 – The UN announces that it will establish large-scale refugee camps in the north of the country to help protect 10,000 displaced Afghans.
- June 22 – The U.S. Department of State issues a "worldwide caution" for U.S. citizens around the world of possible Osama bin Laden-related terrorist attacks. The warning is due to expire or be updated September 22.

== July ==
- July 2 – Taliban Deputy Foreign Minister Mullah Abdul Jalil told U.S. Ambassador to Pakistan William Milam that Osama bin Laden had not been "convicted and that the Taliban still consider him innocent."
- July 3 – The Taliban regime reacts angrily to the U.S. renewal of trade sanctions. The U.S. authorities cite the regime's apparent protection of Saudi "terrorist" Osama bin Laden.
- Mid-July – The Internet is outlawed by the governing Taliban in an effort to prevent the spread of anti-Islamic material. The regime also says it will no longer recognize university qualifications obtained abroad, in particular those from the Afghan University in Peshawar, Pakistan.
- Mid-July – A cholera epidemic reportedly kills 45 people in a single day in the northern Balkh province. The area is on the front line between Taliban and opposition forces.
- July 30 – The UN Security Council adopts Resolution 1363. The Resolution orders new measures to help enforce the arms embargo on Afghanistan. Under the Resolution, monitors should be stationed in neighbouring countries to ensure the sanctions are upheld.

== August ==
- August 3 – Dayna Curry and Heather Mercer were arrested at the home of an Afghan family and accused of teaching Christianity.
- August 5 – Islamic Emirate of Afghanistan troops arrested six foreign aid workers with Shelter Now International on charges of spreading Christianity. The offices of Shelter Now were also seized.
- August 26 – 438 asylum seekers (420 from Afghanistan) were saved from a sinking Indonesian vessel by the MS Tampa. The captain planned to take the asylum seekers to Indonesia, but the asylum seekers apparently threatened the captain and allegedly said they would jump overboard unless they were taken to Australia, prompting the captain set sail for Christmas Island instead. The Australian government however refused permission for the ship to enter Australia's territorial waters.
- August 27 – Islamic Emirate of Afghanistan soldiers entered Iran and seized a border kiosk. Flooded by hundreds of thousands of Afghan refugees, Iran had started deporting Afghans, accusing many of drug dealing.
- August 29 – The captain of the MS Tampa, carrying 438 asylum seekers (420 from Afghanistan), declared a state of emergency and proceeded to enter Australian territorial waters, despite Australian government orders not to. The Australian government responded by dispatching Australian troops to board the ship and prevent it from approaching any further to Christmas Island. The MS Tampa captain was instructed to move the ship back into international waters. He refused. The Norwegian government warned the Australian government not to seek to force the ship to return to international waters against the captain's will. The Australian government tried to persuade Indonesia to accept the asylum seekers; Indonesia refused. The refugees were loaded onto an Australian Navy vessel. Most were transported to the small island country of Nauru and the rest to New Zealand.
- Islamic Emirate of Afghanistan soldiers returned to Iran a border kiosk that they had seized on August 27.
- August 30 – Iran complained to the United Nations that Afghanistan's ruling Islamic Emirate of Afghanistan had raised border tensions by deploying soldiers seizing a kiosk on August 27.
- August 31 – In Afghanistan, the Islamic Emirate of Afghanistan detained non-Afghan staff of the International Assistance Mission in Herat and Jalalabad.
- United Nations Secretary General Kofi Annan urged the Islamic Emirate of Afghanistan to assure the security of humanitarian personnel in Afghanistan.

== September ==
- September 1 – About two dozen foreign aid workers were expelled from Afghanistan by the Islamic Emirate of Afghanistan for allegedly preaching Christianity. The workers were from the international aid organization SERVE and the International Assistance Mission.
- The parents of U.S. citizens Dayna Curry and Heather Mercer visited their daughters for about 30 minutes accompanied by U.S. diplomat David Donahue. Curry, Mercer and six other foreign aid workers (two Germans and four Australians) with Shelter Now International on charges of spreading Christianity. Eight of the foreign aid workers were transferred late from Kabul's juvenile correction center to an unknown place.
- September 2 – 438 asylum seekers (420 from Afghanistan) saved August 26 remained on board the MS Tampa, a Norwegian freighter, stranded in the Indian Ocean. An Australian troop ship was en route to transfer them to Papua New Guinea, where they would be split up and sent to New Zealand and to Nauru. Mahmoud Saikal, the Islamic Emirate of Afghanistan consul to Australia, praised Naura and New Zealand, and condemned Australia.
- The United Nations called for fair trials for all 24 foreign and Afghan aid workers detained by the Islamic Emirate of Afghanistan. The detainees were charged with promoting Christianity.
- Islamic Emirate of Afghanistan Foreign Minister Wakil Ahmed Muttawakil assured relief organizations that, other than SERVE, International Assistance Mission, and Shelter Now International, no other foreign aid groups were under scrutiny for preaching Christianity.
- September 3 – In Kabul, Afghanistan, the trial began for eight foreign aid workers, as the nine-judge bench of the Supreme Court held preliminary deliberations. Evidence included Bibles and video and audio tapes, along with investigation files from the religious police. Shelter Now denied its staff were involved in missionary work, however the Taliban claimed to have written confessions from the detainees. The accused were Georg Taubmann, Katrin Jelinek, Margrit Stebner and Silke Durrkopf, all German; Australians Peter Bunch and Diana Thomas; and U.S. citizens Dayna Curry and Heather Mercer.
- September 4 – Intense fighting erupted between Taliban forces and the United Islamic Front for the Salvation of Afghanistan in Kapisa province. Elsewhere, the Taliban captured two important areas, Khanqa and Sang-e-Bada southwest of Mahmood Raqi, provincial capital of Kapisa.
- September 5 – The Islamic Emirate of Afghanistan denied Western diplomats access to a court where eight foreign aid workers were on trial for promoting Christianity, but Chief Justice Noor Mohammad Saqib said the defendants could hire foreign lawyers. He also said that the defendants could face hanging. Despite repeated requests, Australian, German and U.S. consuls in Kabul had been denied any meetings with Taliban authorities for a week.
- The wife of jailed Sheikh Omar Abdel-Rahman sent letters to U.S. president George W. Bush and the Islamic Emirate of Afghanistan leadership to urge them to exchange Abdel-Rahman for the eight foreign workers standing trial.
- September 6 – The United Nations special envoy to Afghanistan, Francesc Vendrell, arrived in Kabul, saying the trial of the arrested foreign aid workers would be meaningful only if it is held in an open court. Despite an earlier promise to do so, the Islamic Emirate of Afghanistan had not allowed journalists, Western diplomats or relatives of the accused any access to the proceedings.
- Afghan Foreign Minister Abdul Wakil Motawakil said that, with some "rare" exceptions, all international flights over Afghanistan, including those by the U.N. and International Committee of the Red Cross, would be stopped unless the United Nations released funds from frozen aviation accounts. The United Nations Security Council had banned international flights by Ariana Afghan Airlines except for humanitarian reasons as part of sanctions imposed over the Taliban's refusal to extradite suspected terrorist Osama bin Laden.
- The World Food Programme announced that Afghanistan was on the brink of famine, and appealed for $151 million to fund an "emergency operation".
- The Central Board of Revenue of Pakistan approved zero-rated export of cement and tobacco leaf to Central Asian Republics and Afghanistan via land route.
- September 7 – The trial of eight foreign aid workers detained in Afghanistan on charges of preaching Christianity went into recess for a weekly holiday.
- September 8 – Eight foreign aid workers on trial for promoting Christianity in Afghanistan appeared for the first time in the Supreme Court, and said they were innocent of proselytising. The hearing was presided over by Chief Justice Noor Mohammad Saqib and 18 other judges. One of the six female defendants was wearing the head-to-toe cloak which is mandatory for Afghan women in public, while the others had veils over their hair only. The defendants walked slowly into the court under the escort of armed guards, who did not allow them to answer questions from journalists waiting outside the court. The mother of one of the US prisoners and the father of another accompanied their daughters into the court, but the cousin of the Australian man was kept waiting outside along with Australian, German and US diplomats.
- The Islamic Emirate of Afghanistan took control of the Shokhi and Khan Aqa districts in Kapisa province after several days of heavy clashes with the Afghan Northern Alliance led by Ahmad Shah Massoud.
- September 9 – Afghan opposition leader Ahmed Shah Massoud was assassinated. Two suicide bombers, posing as journalists, blew themselves up during the purported interview mortally wounding Massoud. The suicide bomber was killed along with one of Massoud's followers, and the Afghan commander's guards reportedly killed the second attacker. The terrorists first conducted interviews with opposition soldiers in Shomali before meeting with Massoud. The bomb was either hidden in the camera or camera battery belt of the terrorists. Massoud was evacuated by helicopter to Tajikistan where he was announced dead on arrival.
- A formal National Security Presidential Directive submitted on September 9, 2001, had outlined essentially the same war plan that the White House, the CIA and the Pentagon put into action after the September 11 attacks. The plan dealt with all aspects of a war against al-Qaeda, ranging from diplomatic initiatives to military operations in Afghanistan, including outlines to persuade Afghanistan's Taliban government to turn bin Laden over to the United States, with provisions to use military force if it refused.
- The Afghan Supreme Court resumed the trial of eight foreign aid workers held for allegedly preaching Christianity, but no detainees, diplomats or journalists were present.
- In Afghanistan, the Islamic Emirate of Afghanistan jailed 35 Afghan employees of one of the recently expelled foreign assistance groups.
- September 10 – More than 135 Taliban were killed and 75 captured in an attack by opposition forces on Taliban positions in Eshkamesh and Chal districts of Takhar province, Afghanistan.
- Islamic Emirate of Afghanistan jets bombed residential areas in Khuram, Afghanistan, wounding six people and destroying three houses.
- More than 30 Taliban fighters were killed or wounded in the Safid Kotal area of Afghanistan when two trucks carrying them hit landmines.
- The United Nations World Food Programme appealed to international donors for US$150 million to assist the estimated 5.5 million suffering people in Afghanistan.
- September 11 – Suicide attacks on the U.S. kill more than 3,000 people and destroy the two towers of the World Trade Center and part of the Pentagon, using three hijacked passenger airliners as cruise missiles, with a fourth, also hijacked, crashing in a field in Pennsylvania. Early speculation about the source of the attack centered on Saudi-born terrorist leader Osama bin Laden, who was living in and working from Afghanistan. Islamic Emirate of Afghanistan leaders condemned the attacks and rejected suggestions that Osama bin Laden could be behind them.
- Rocket explosions and anti-aircraft fire rocked Kabul, Afghanistan. Both the U.S. and Afghan oppositional forces denied involvement.
- September 12 – In an internationally televised address, U.S. president George W. Bush announced a "war against terrorism" intent on targeting both terrorists and those who harbored terrorists. The Islamic Emirate of Afghanistan was implied in this declaration.
- Germany said that the 23 German nationals in Afghanistan had been told to leave the country due to safety concerns.
- The Islamic Emirate of Afghanistan militia said it would consider requests for the extradition of terror suspect Osama bin Laden based on evidence from U.S. investigators.
- Tetsu Nakamura, a Japanese doctor, traveled from Peshawar in Pakistan to Afghanistan to evacuate Japanese health clinic staffers. He stayed in Jalalabad for three days, providing medical attention to refugees.
- USS Enterprise, on its way home from its deployment, was turned around to join USS Carl Vinson in the Fifth Fleet area of operations.
- September 13 – In anticipation of U.S. strikes, Muslim militants were reported fleeing Kabul, Afghanistan, while other residents were said to be digging trenches around the city.
- The Afghan Northern Alliance named General Mohammad Fahim as the new leader to replace the deceased Ahmed Shah Massoud.
- United States Secretary of State Colin Powell confirmed that Osama bin Laden was a suspect, but not the only suspect, for the September 11th attacks. Powell was in contact with Pakistan president Pervez Musharraf to build cooperation in fighting terrorism and to discuss the possibility of U.S. usage of Pakistani air space. Powell also announced that U.S. Deputy Secretary of State Richard Armitage would soon travel to Moscow for talks with Russian Deputy Foreign Minister Vyacheslav Trubnikov about Afghanistan.
- A British security official said that, if evidence emerges that Saudi-born exile Osama bin Laden was behind the September 11th attack, an attack on Afghanistan was an option that NATO was considering. NATO denied the report.
- Three Western diplomats, representing eight aid workers on trial for allegedly preaching Christianity, left Afghanistan amid an exodus of foreigners concerned over possible U.S. attacks. Family members of the detainees also left the country. However, the eight aid workers remained in the custody of the Islamic Emirate of Afghanistan militia as an Islamic court continued their trial behind closed doors.
- Senior diplomats from Russia, India, Iran and Uzbekistan met in Tajikistan to discuss possible assistance to anti-Taliban forces in Afghanistan. Tajikistan President Emomali Rakhmonov met with Indian Deputy Foreign Minister Omar Abdullah.
- The United Nations and several foreign aid organizations completed a swift withdrawal from Afghanistan, fearing a U.S. strike.
- September 14 – United States Secretary of State Colin Powell warned the Islamic Emirate of Afghanistan militia that they could not separate their own activities from the activities of terrorists harbored within their borders.
- Eric Schultz of the U.S. Embassy in the Turkmenistan met with Turkmen President Saparmurat Niyazov in Ashkhabad to discuss responses to the September 11th attacks.
- Islamic Emirate of Afghanistan leaders warned of revenge "by other means" if the United States attacked Afghanistan in retaliation for the September 11th attacks. Hamas official Abdel-Aziz al-Rantissi and Muslim Brotherhood spokesman Mamoun Hudaibi echoed the warning and defended the point of view.
- The World Food Programme warned that, following exodus of aid workers, about 1.5 million Afghans could emigrate out of Afghanistan in search of food. The U.N. estimated that, to date, Afghanistan had 900,000 internally displaced persons and that there were more than three million Afghan refugees in Iran and Pakistan alone. Furthermore, the U.N. estimated that a quarter of the population (5.5 million people) would be reliant on food aid if they were to stay alive through November.
- Akil Akilov, the prime minister of Tajikistan, said that his nation was not yet prepared to guarantee the United States air space should the Bush administration decide to launch retaliatory strikes against suspected terrorist bases in Afghanistan.
- Russian Defense Minister Sergei Ivanov said that Moscow would not allow NATO forces to be stationed in any of the former Soviet republics.
- US Congress authorized president George W. Bush to use "all necessary and appropriate force" against the terrorists who orchestrated the September 11th attacks. The vote in the U.S. Senate was unanimous. There was only one dissenting ballot in the United States House of Representatives.
- The Pakistan Ulema Council called for a jihad against the United States if they attack Afghanistan. Council vicechair Maulana Naseeruddin organized rallies and "Death to America" conferences around Pakistan.
- September 15 – United States Secretary of State Colin Powell said that Pakistan agreed to cooperate if the United States decided to strike Afghanistan. The Washington Post reported Pakistani officials had agreed to allow the United States to use Pakistani airspace in the event of a military strike against Afghanistan, but Pakistan would not involve its forces in any action beyond its own geographical boundaries.
- As U.S. president George W. Bush met with his national security team at Camp David, he told reporters that Osama bin Laden was a prime suspect in the September 11th attacks. Bush added that bin Laden was mistaken if he thought he could avoid capture or death.
- Mullah Mohammed Omar issued a call for jihad against the United States and its supporters if they attacked or assisted an attack on Afghanistan. The Taliban also asked all foreigners to leave Afghanistan in view of a possible attack by the United States.
- Russian Foreign Minister Igor Ivanov expressed implicit Russian support for a possible U.S. armed intervention in Afghanistan.
- India, which did not share a formal military relationship with the United States, decided to allow its facilities to be used for strikes against Afghanistan. India also provided the United States with intelligence information on training camps of Islamic militants in the region.
- Aziz al-Rahman, an Islamic Emirate of Afghanistan diplomat, said Osama bin Laden was free to leave Afghanistan but would not be forced out.
- Iran announced it deployed military and police forces to seal its 560-mile border with Afghanistan to prevent a possible influx of refugees.
- People's Republic of China Foreign Ministry spokesman Zhu Bangzao said that claims made by The Washington Post and The Wall Street Journal of connections between China and the Taliban were false.
- September 16 – U.S. president George W. Bush told his military to get ready for a long war on terrorism, adding that they would smoke the enemies "out of their holes".
- The Islamic Emirate of Afghanistan information minister, Qadratullah Jamal, said that Afghanistan had "fortified our bunkers and our important installations, including military bases and airfields."
- Islamic Emirate of Afghanistan leader Mullah Mohammed Omar met with senior clerics and received their support.
- The International Red Cross and Red Crescent Movement removed its remaining 15 foreign aid workers from Afghanistan.
- Osama bin Laden published a statement to the Afghan Islamic Press that he was not responsible for the September 11th attacks. In the statement bin Laden said "The U.S. is pointing the finger at me but I categorically state that I have not done this."
- Afghan Northern Alliance Foreign Minister Abdullah offered full support to the United States in any operations, including 15,000 of its fighters for any possible strike on Osama bin Laden.
- Thousands attended the funeral of Ahmad Shah Massoud, former commander of the Afghan Northern Alliance, who was buried in his home village of Basarak in the Panjshir Valley of Afghanistan.
- The Revolutionary Association of the Women of Afghanistan urged the U.S. to show restraint in attacking Afghanistan, hoping that the U.S. "could differentiate between the people of Afghanistan and a handful of fundamentalist terrorists."
- Iranian President Mohammad Khatami condemned the assassination of Afghan Northern Alliance leader Ahmad Shah Massoud.
- Pakistan asked the United Nations for permission to travel to Afghanistan on September 16 to petition Kabul to turn over Osama bin Laden.
- A Pakistani newspaper reported that Osama bin Laden had sneaked out of Kandahar, along with his wives, children and followers and moved to an undisclosed secret location in Afghanistan.
- The six member states of the Gulf Cooperation Council unanimously condemned the September 11th attacks and assured the United States they were ready to take part in its war on terrorism.
- A Russian division of 7,000 men based in Tajikistan, which borders Afghanistan, was placed on heightened combat alert. However, Tajikistan announced it would not allow Western nations to launch attacks on Afghanistan from its territory. Tajikistan was struggling to recover from a five-year civil war between Islamic opposition forces and a hard-line secular government, and was heavily dependent on Russia for military and political support.
- The last of Western aid workers left Afghanistan.
- To date, Afghans made up the single biggest refugee group in the world with more than 2.6 million in exile, mainly in Pakistan and Iran.
- September 17 – Pakistan placed its army on alert ahead of a possible U.S. attack on Afghanistan.
- Iran's supreme leader Ayatollah Ali Khamenei condemned the September 11th attacks but added that attacking Afghanistan might cause a human catastrophe and could trigger more problems for the United States.
- Afghanistan shut down its airspace, two weeks after threatening to close it if the United Nations did not lift sanctions against Ariana Afghan Airlines. Although no flights were landing in Afghanistan, many flights were flying across Afghan airspace. Each time an aircraft flew over Afghanistan the airline had to pay Ariana $400. The money was deposited in accounts in Geneva that were frozen because of the sanctions.
- In Kandahar, a delegation of Pakistani officials led by intelligence chief General Mahmood Ahmed held a morning meeting with the Islamic Emirate of Afghanistan leadership, including Mullah Mohammed Omar, to discuss cooperation with the United States.
- Tajikistan's armed forces were placed on alert following reports that 5,000 Islamic Emirate of Afghanistan fighters in Afghanistan had approached the border.
- Pakistan's army reported that Islamic Emirate of Afghanistan troops of between 20,000 and 25,000 had been deployed just across the border from the Khyber Pass. A Pakistani army officer said Pakistan had reinforced its own troops fanned out along the region.
- Iran's supreme leader Ayatollah Ali Khamenei advised the United States against a full-scale war in Afghanistan.
- September 18 – Ruud Lubbers, who was serving as the United Nations High Commissioner for Refugees, visited Washington, D.C. to warn the United States Department of State that millions of Afghans had already faced starvation and homelessness and U.S. attacks "might hit additionally" many more.
- The BBC News reported that Niaz Naik, a former Foreign Secretary of Pakistan, claimed that he had been told by senior American officials in mid-July 2001 that military action against Afghanistan would begin by the middle of October at the latest. The message was conveyed during a meeting on Afghanistan between senior U.S., Russian, Iranian, and Pakistani diplomats. The meeting was the third in a series of meetings on Afghanistan, with the previous meeting having been held in March 2001. During the July 2001 meeting, Naik was told that Washington would launch its military operation from bases in Tajikistan – where American advisers were already in place – and that the wider objective was to topple the Taliban regime and install another government in place.
- The United Nations Security Council demanded that the Islamic Emirate of Afghanistan "immediately and unconditionally" hand over Osama bin Laden.
- Afghan Information Minister Qudrutullah Jamal condemned the September 11th attacks.
- A delegation of Pakistani officials led by intelligence chief General Mahmood Ahmed flew from Kandahar to Kabul to negotiate with Islamic Emirate of Afghanistan leaders, including Mullah Mohammad Hassan Akhond and Foreign Minister Wakil Ahmed Muttawakil.
- Sibghatullah Mujaddedi, the head of the National Salvation Front of Afghanistan and first President of the Mujahideen government, condemned the September 11th attacks and urged the United States to exercise restraint.
- Afghan rebel leader Gulbuddin Hekmatyar, from his safe house in Iran, condemned the potential attack by the United States on Afghanistan, and threatened to band with other groups to resist it. Hekmatyar said also that he had no reason to disbelieve Osama bin Laden's denial of involvement in the September 11th attacks.
- In Afghanistan, a meeting of the shura, a collection of 1,000 village clerics and mullahs, was scheduled to decide the fate of Osama bin Laden, but the council could not reach Kabul in time. The meeting was postponed one day.
- In an address on the Taliban's Radio Shariat, Islamic Emirate of Afghanistan Interior Minister Mullah Abdul Razzaq called for volunteers willing to fight against an invasion of the United States.
- Iran Foreign Minister Kamal Kharrazi cautioned against a U.S. military strike on Afghanistan.
- The United Nations World Food Programme warned that an estimated 3.8 million Afghans, completely dependent on outside aid, had only enough food stocks for two to three weeks.
- India announced that Afghan refugees living in the country would have to register themselves.
- Officials in Pakistan and Tajikistan reported 10,000 Afghans fleeing into their borders. However Islamic Emirate of Afghanistan Maulvi Abdul Hai Mutmaen denied reports that people were fleeing Kabul and Kandahar.
- The National Post reported that Iran sent a message to the United States government via Canada stating it would not oppose targeted military strikes against those responsible for the September 11th attacks.
- September 19 – Official beginning of United States' combat activities in Afghanistan, as designated by president George W. Bush in his "Afghanistan Combat Zone Executive Order" on December 12, 2001.
- The United States ordered over 100 military aircraft to the Persian Gulf region.
- The USS Theodore Roosevelt left Norfolk, Virginia for the Persian Gulf as part of a 14-ship battle group.
- In Kabul, Afghanistan, Taliban leader Mullah Mohammed Omar announced he was ready to hold talks with the United States. He also urged the U.S. to use patience and to gather and turn over evidence to the Taliban Supreme Court. Omar suggested that the U.S. was using Osama bin Laden as a pretext to topple the Islamic Emirate of Afghanistan. The U.S. government responded by stating it wanted action, not negotiations.
- Islamic Emirate of Afghanistan Interior Minister Mullah Abdul Razzaq urged Afghan citizens to support a jihad.
- Fearing a U.S. response, an exodus of thousands of Afghan peoples headed for Iran and Pakistan.
- The Islamic Emirate of Afghanistan asked that CNN leave Afghanistan.
- A Pakistani delegation sent to Kabul, Afghanistan to convince the Taliban movement to hand over Osama bin Laden also visited the eight detained Shelter Now International workers on trial for spreading Christianity. The delegation spokesman said the detainees appeared well and in good spirits.
- September 20 – Tajikistan president Emomali Rakhmonov said refugees fleeing Afghanistan would not be permitted into Tajikistan.
- Iran set up refugee camps on Afghan soil and asked relief organizations to help provide services to the camps. Iran also ordered its troops to seal its border with Afghanistan. Iran also stated that it would not allow the U.S. warplanes to use Iranian air space to attack Afghanistan.
- In Afghanistan, the shura, a council of 1,000 village clerics and mullahs, issued an edict that called on the Taliban to persuade Osama bin Laden to leave Afghanistan, but the United States rejected the suggestion.
- Mullah Mohammed Omar appealed to guerrillas in Jammu and Kashmir to return to Afghanistan to defend against attacks. The shura also warned that any attacks on Afghanistan would cause a jihad.
- U.S. president George W. Bush addressed the United States Congress and demanded that the Taliban deliver Osama bin Laden and destroy bases of al Qaeda.
- The Afghan Northern Alliance capture of several Taliban posts and dozens of villages in Samangan province, Afghanistan.
- Uzbekistan and Tajikistan both agreed to allow the United States Air Force to use their facilities to mount patrols and combat missions against the Taliban in Afghanistan.
- September 21 – U.S. defense secretary Donald Rumsfeld suggested that the United States would seek to work with the Afghan Northern Alliance in future operations in Afghanistan.
- The Afghan Northern Alliance drove the Taliban out of Dara-i-suf, Afghanistan.
- In Islamabad, the Taliban ambassador to Pakistan, Abdul Salam Zaeef, stated that until evidence was procured, the Islamic Emirate of Afghanistan was not prepared to surrender Osama bin Laden to the United States.
- In Karachi, Pakistan, an estimated 40,000 people protested against potential U.S. strikes on Afghanistan. Four protesters were killed and ten police officers were injured. Other protests in Peshawar (10,000 protesters), Quetta (3,000 protesters), and Islamabad (1,500 protesters) occurred without incident.
- The Islamic Emirate of Afghanistan requested the United Nations suspend all communications from Kabul to the outside world.
- A crisis meeting of European Union foreign ministers agreed unanimously to support the right of the United States to attack Afghanistan.
- September 22 – Japan's Ministry of Finance announced that payments or fund transfers to accounts in Afghanistan and to Taliban-related individuals living outside Afghanistan needed its permission.
- In Afghanistan, an unmanned U.S. spy plane collecting intelligence for the CIA was shot down over Samangan Province by Taliban forces.
- U.S. transport planes landed at the military airfield in Tuzel, Uzbekistan.
- Turkey announced that it would allow U.S. transport planes to use its bases and airspace.
- Taliban forces pounded Afghan Northern Alliance positions in Samangan Province and Balkh Province, Afghanistan.
- The United States Defense Department called to active duty another 5,000 Air Force Reserve and Air National Guard members, bringing the total number of active reservists to more than 10,000.
- Scores of Afghan men threw rocks and bricks at the gate of the U.S. embassy, screaming "death to America." The embassy had been abandoned since 1988.
- Pakistan foreign ministry spokesman Riaz Mohammed Khan said his country would keep open diplomatic ties with the Taliban leadership in Afghanistan.
- The United Arab Emirates cut diplomatic ties to the Islamic Emirate of Afghanistan after failing to persuade Taliban leadership to abide by the United Nations Security Council resolution demanding the hand over of Osama bin Laden.
- Mohammed Fahim, the military leader of the Afghan Northern Alliance, held talks in Tajikistan with Russian army chief Anatoly Kvashnin.
- Russian president Vladimir Putin and U.S. president George W. Bush held a 40-minute telephone conversation to discuss the war on terrorism.
- September 23 – Members of Jamiat Ulema i-Islam marched from their homes in Pakistan to the Afghan border to fend off a possible U.S. invasion.
- The Afghan Islamic Press reported that Osama bin Laden went into hiding.
- September 25 – During a visit by Japanese Prime Minister Junichiro Koizumi, when a reporter asked if the United States should help Afghan people liberate themselves from Taliban rule, president George W. Bush said, "We're not into nation-building; we're focused on justice."
- September 26 – An article in The Guardian on September 26, 2001, also adds evidence that there were already signs in the first half of 2001 that Washington was moving to threaten Afghanistan militarily from the north, by way of Tajikistan and Uzbekistan. A U.S. Department of Defense official, Dr. Jeffrey Starr, visited Tajikistan in January 2001 and U.S. General Tommy Franks visited the country in May 2001, conveying a message from the Bush administration that the US considered Tajikistan "a strategically significant country". However, this assertion overlooks the fact that these relationships had been ongoing since the breakup of the USSR, and that under Clinton similar statements had been made by military officials. U.S. Army Rangers were training special troops inside Kyrgyzstan, and there were unconfirmed reports that Tajik and Uzbek special troops were training in Alaska and Montana. Reliable western military sources say a U.S. contingency plan existed on paper by the end of the summer to attack Afghanistan from the north, with U.S. military advisors already in place in Tajikistan and Uzbekistan.

== October ==
- October 6 – President George W. Bush tells Congressional leaders about the upcoming attack.
- October 7 – Osama bin Laden releases a videotaped statement after the attacks begin.
- 9:30 a.m. EDT (approx): The leader of the Northern Alliance says he believes the U.S.-led attack will begin "very soon".
- 11:30 a.m. EDT (approx): Israel is informed about the upcoming attack.
- 12:30 p.m. EDT (9 p.m. local time): the United States, supported by Britain, begins its attack on Afghanistan, launching bombs and cruise missiles against Taliban military and communications facilities and suspected terrorist training camps. A Northern Alliance spokesman later tells CNN that attack hit anti-aircraft batteries near Kabul and "at least three terrorist camps" near Jalalabad. Initial reports are that Kabul, Kandahar, and Herat are among the targets. Electricity in Kabul is almost immediately cut off. A number of different technologies were employed in the strike. U.S. Air Force general Richard Myers, chairman of the U.S. Joint Chiefs of Staff, stated that approximately 50 Tomahawk cruise missiles, launched by British and U.S. submarines and ships, 25 F/A-18 Hornet strike aircraft from U.S. aircraft carriers, USS Carl Vinson and USS Enterprise and 15 U.S. Air Force bombers, such as B-1 Lancer, B-2 Spirit, B-52 Stratofortress were involved in the first wave, launched from Diego Garcia. Two C-17 Globemaster transport jets delivered 37,500 daily rations by airdrop to internally displaced persons inside Afghanistan on the first day of the attack.
- 1 p.m. EDT: President Bush makes a televised speech announcing the attack and discussing further US's intentions, including humanitarian aid."On my orders, the United States military has begun strikes against al Qaeda training camps and military installations of the Taliban regime in Afghanistan." ... "We are the friends of almost a billion worldwide who practice the Islamic faith. The United States of America is an enemy of those who aid terrorists and of the barbaric criminals who profane a great religion by committing murder in its name." The FBI, using the National Alert Network, asks law enforcement agencies across the United States to go to their highest alert status against possible terrorist attacks. The security perimeter around the White House is increased. A peace rally of ten to twelve thousand people is held in New York City. They march from Union Square, the central spontaneous September 11, 2001 Terrorist Attack/Memorials and Services site in Manhattan, to Times Square, cheering the police at the beginning of the march. The list of about twelve speakers was cut to three or four by the police, and they were herded at the end into a one-lane-wide "bullpen". The New York Times places their coverage of the march on page B12. By 8 p.m. EDT, there had been three waves of attacks.
- 8:35 p.m. EDT: BBC News tentatively reports a fourth wave of attacks.
- 9:45 p.m. EDT: The first reports of casualties.
- 10 p.m. EDT: Rudy Giuliani in a news conference announces more National Guard and policemen had been assigned to New York City.
- October 8 – Protest rallies lead to three casualties in the Gaza Strip and one in Pakistan. Palestinian authorities shoot and kill two students, one a 13-year-old. Crowds then ransack Palestinian police buildings. In Pakistan, protests take place in Islamabad, Peshawar, Lahore, Karachi, Quetta, and near the Khyber Pass border crossing. The most violent protests in Pakistan are in Quetta (60 miles from Afghan border), where one person is shot and killed, the central police station, United Nations buildings, and several shops and movie theaters are set on fire and looted, and a police subinspector is kidnapped. Ten thousand students at three universities protest without incident in Cairo, Egypt.
- 12:00 p.m. EDT (approx): Department of Defense officials report a second round of attacks. Electricity in Kabul is again cut off.
- 1:00 p.m. EDT (approx): The English journalist Yvonne Ridley is released by the Taliban and arrived at the Pakistan border.
- 1:08 p.m. EDT: Donald Rumsfeld and General Myers convene a press briefing. As of midnight, allied forces had struck 31 targets, including early warning radars, ground forces, command and control facilities, airfields and aircraft. "Strikes are continuing as we speak." About 10 bombers and 10 carrier-based jets participated. "We will use some Tomahawk missiles today from ships." No cruise missiles are launched from bombers. Leaflets are dropped that include some symbols and figures.
- October 9 – In a news conference in Islamabad, Pakistan, a United Nations spokeswoman reports that a cruise missile killed four U.N. employees and injured four others in a building several miles east of Kabul. The casualties were Afghans who were security guards in an Afghan Technical Consultancy, the U.N. de-mining agency building. (Afghanistan was, at that time, the most heavily mined nation on the planet.) German Chancellor Gerhard Schröder meets with President Bush in Washington, D.C.
- October 10 - An uncertain amount of civilians were reported killed on the village of Karam.
- October 11 – 8 p.m. EDT: President Bush holds the first primetime presidential news conference since 1995. He had this message for the Taliban: "If you cough him up and his people today that we'll reconsider what we're doing to your country. You still have a second chance. Just bring him in, and bring his leaders and lieutenants and other thugs and criminals with him."
- October 22- The village of Chowkar-Karez is bombed, killing an unknown number of civilians.

== November ==
- November 8 – Pakistan, being the only nation that still had diplomatic ties to the Taliban, asked Afghanistan's rulers to close their consulate in the city of Karachi.

Three Japanese warships with several hundred sailors left port for the Indian Ocean. The goal was to provide the U.S.-led forces with non-combat military support. This was Japan's first mission of this kind since World War II.

Prime minister Wim Kok of the Netherlands announced that 1000 soldiers would join the efforts of the war against terrorism.

- November 10 – The Taliban and Northern Alliance fighters both claimed that the strategic northern Afghan city of Mazari Sharif was taken by Northern Alliance fighters.
- November 12 – Taliban forces abandon Kabul ahead of advancing Northern Alliance troops. Iranian forces aligned with the Coalition capture Herat.
- November 13 – Northern Alliance fighters take over Kabul, the Afghan capital, thereby gaining control of virtually all of northern Afghanistan.
- November 25 – Northern Alliance gained control of Kunduz, the last Taliban stronghold in Northern Afghanistan, but only after Pakistani aircraft rescued several thousand Taliban and Al-Qaeda fighters and their military advisers. The Taliban then controlled less than 25% of the country, mainly around Kandahar in the south.

U.S. Marines landed in force by helicopter at Camp Rhino south of Kandahar and began preparing it for fixed wing aircraft. They also occupied the main road between Kandahar and Pakistan.

Forces loyal to bin Laden smuggled weapons into Qala-i-Jangi prison near Mazari Sharif, where they were held after surrendering at Kunduz. They attacked the Northern Alliance guards and storm an armory. U.S. Special Forces call in air attacks. During the Battle of Qala-i-Jangi hundreds of prisoners are killed as well as 40 Alliance fighters and one U.S. CIA operative, Johnny Micheal Spann. Spann becomes the first U.S. and Coalition combat casualty. A young American named John Walker Lindh is found in the midst of the rebellion and extradited to the US on terrorism charges.

Four British Special Air Service special forces troops were injured inside Afghanistan and evacuated to hospital in Britain although the time and location of their operation was not known.

== December ==
- December 3 – News reports state that Australian, British, French, German and Russian special forces are on the ground in Afghanistan in addition to U.S. special forces and marines.
- December 4 – Scott Peterson, writing in The Christian Science Monitor, quoted a defector he described as the

Taliban deputy interior minister, and "highest ranking Taliban defector to date". According to Peterson this defector described the American bombardment as very effective, "Kabul city has seen many rockets, but this was a different thing" and "the American bombing of Taliban trenches, cars, and troops caused us to be defeated. All ways were blocked, so there was no way to carry food or ammunition to the front. All trenches of the Taliban were destroyed, and many people were killed."

- December 6 – Mullah Omar began to signal that he was ready to surrender Kandahar to tribal forces. His forces were by now broken by heavy U.S. bombing, and he was living constantly on the run within Kandahar to avoid becoming a target. Recognizing that he could not hold on to Kandahar much longer, he began signaling a willingness in negotiations to turn the city over to the tribal leaders, assuming that he and his top men received some protection.
- December 7 - The Islamic Emirate of Afghanistan is overthrown during the Fall of Kandahar.
- December 17 – The US and Northern Alliance destroy the Tora Bora stronghold during the Battle of Tora Bora.
- December 18 – According to a December 18, 2001, article published in The New York Times, the US and Northern Alliance had started to diverge over the American aerial policy.

It quoted a Northern Alliance commander, who stated:

"They have got their own program. Last night, they even bombed us. The Americans are going to be restless until Osama is really killed or somebody gives them a document that Osama has been killed."

The article quoted a senior American military official, who stated:

"Look, these Eastern Shura are basically a group of village leaders. So if the al Qaeda in their area have been driven off, and the caves and tunnels around their areas are now safe again to go in, the battle is basically over from their point of view.

"But we want to get a lot of those guys who are now fleeing and trying to get away. We want to get bin Laden. So, yeah, we've got different objectives right now."

- December 20 – United Nations Security Council Resolution 1386 on December 20, 2001, supported "international efforts to root out terrorism, in keeping with the Charter of the United Nations, and reaffirming also its resolutions 1368 (2001) of September 12, 2001, and 1373 (2001) of September 28, 2001" and subsequently established the International Security Assistance Force.
- Throughout December

U.S. and Northern Alliance forces are aided by so-called Eastern Alliance of ethnic Pashtuns in driving the Taliban from control of all areas of Afghanistan. U.S. attacks target al-Qaeda strongholds in Tora Bora near the Pakistan border. Many al-Qaeda are taken prisoner by U.S., Pakistan and the new UN-approved interim government of Afghanistan. UN peacekeepers move into Afghanistan.

== Deaths ==
Professor Professor Marc W. Herold of the University of New Hampshire estimated that the civilian death toll in the first two months of the war could have been as high as 3,767.
