= 2000 in Afghanistan =

- Decades: 1980s; 1990s; 2000s; 2010s; 2020s
- See also: Other events of 2000; List of years in Afghanistan

The following lists events that happened during 2000 in Afghanistan.

== Incumbents ==
- De facto head of state: Mohammed Omar
- President: Burhanuddin Rabbani

== Events ==
=== February ===
- February 10 - The hijacking of an Ariana (Afghani airline) Boeing 727 aircraft, which was seized on an internal flight, and forced to fly via Central Asia to Moscow and then on to the UK, ends peacefully at Stansted airport north of London

=== March ===
Ismail Khan, a former governor of Herat and leading opponent of the ruling Taliban regime, escapes from prison in Kandahar.

=== April ===
- April 13 - After reaching an agreement with the UNHCR, Iran started a repatriation program that would send 7,700 Afghan refugees back to their homeland over the next three weeks.
- April 15 - Islamic Emirate of Afghanistan authorities in Afghanistan arrested two Arabs on suspicion of spying. The suspects were flown from Kabul to Kandahar and were being held there under tight security.
- April 17 - Speaking at the Tashkent University of World Economy and Diplomacy, United States Secretary of State Madeleine Albright promised $10 million in aid to Uzbekistan to help secure its border with Afghanistan. She called on the nations bordering Afghanistan to form open and democratic societies as a defense against extremism and terrorism. Albright also announced that the U.S. government was giving US$3 million apiece to help train border patrols in Kazakhstan, Kyrgyzstan and Uzbekistan and to buy four-wheel drive vehicles for the rugged terrain.
- April 17 - Islamic Emirate of Afghanistan aircraft carried out a number of sorties over the regions of Khasor and Lama in Saripul Province, Afghanistan.
- April 18 - The Afghani lost over 25% of its value, increasing inflation in Afghanistan.
- April 19 - The Islamic Emirate of Afghanistan shut down the money market in Kabul, Afghanistan to stop a freefall of the Afghani currency. Valued at 55,075 to the U.S. dollar on March 31, by April 19 it traded at 75,000.
- April 19 - Islamic Emirate of Afghanistan authorities signed agreements with the UAE-based SURIA Satellite Company and the Chinese EIIC Company to revive the communication sector in Afghanistan.
- April 20 - Three people were killed and a number wounded in a clash between the Taliban and Hezb-e-Wahdat forces in Dara-e-Souf district, Samangan province, Afghanistan.
- April 20 - Three people were killed and ten others injured in fighting between the Taliban and Ahmed Shah Masood forces in Parwan province, Afghanistan.
- April 20 - Fatima Gilani, the head of the Association of the Women of Afghanistan, met in Islamabad, Pakistan with members of Amnesty International.
- April 20 - UNICEF announced that over the past three weeks the measles had killed nearly 100 children in Tolak district, Ghor province, Afghanistan, and over 50 children in the Yaftalafain district of Badakhshan province. This brought the death toll to more than 1000. The outbreak first erupted in Dara-e-Souf district, Samangan province in January. UNICEF dispatched vaccine and other medicines to the areas.
- April 20 - A six-month repatriation program designed by Iran and the UNHCR for Afghan refugees began. Under the agreement, 3000 refugees would be repatriated to Afghanistan every week.
- April 21 - Warring factions in Afghanistan agreed to a three-day cease-fire (starting May 1) to allow the U.N. to carry out a polio vaccination campaign.
- April 21 - In Dushanbe, Tajikistan, U.N. Special Envoy for Afghanistan Francesc Vendrell held peace talks with Northern Alliance commander Ahmed Shah Masood, former Nangarhar province governor Haji Abdul Qadeer and former member of the ousted Rabbani government Syed Hussain Anwari.
- April 21 - Islamic Emirate of Afghanistan leadership distanced itself from posters circulating in Pakistan in which Osama bin Laden called for a holy war against the United States.
- April 22 - The Northern Alliance accused the Taliban of executing at least 26 people in the Gusfandi district after the area fell to Taliban forces.
- April 22 - Swarms of locusts descended on drought-hit wheat crops and fruit orchards in Baghlan province, Afghanistan.
- April 22 - The Revolutionary Association of the Women of Afghanistan appealed to Pakistan to change its policy towards the Taliban and to condemn Taliban atrocities against Afghan women.
- April 22 - In Taluqan, Takhar province, Afghanistan, Ahmed Shah Masood, Abdul Rashid Dostum, Abdullah, Waheedullah Sabawoon and Hisamuddin met to discuss attack strategies against the Taliban.
- April 23 - At a U.N. guesthouse in downtown Kabul, Afghanistan, an Easter service was held for International aid workers.
- April 23 - In Peshawar, Pakistan, three gunmen killed Maulvi Mohammad Siddiqullah, a former commander of Hezbi Islami.
- April 24 - In the Dara-I-Nur district area in Nangarhar province, Afghanistan, dozens were killed in a clash between Taliban forces and supporters of Hazrat Ali, commander of the defunct Eastern Shoora. Taliban forces made a two kilometer advance in the area.
- April 24 - Northern Alliance forces captured three Taliban military posts in Parwan province. Five Taliban militiamen were killed in the attack. The Taliban claimed these offensives were illegal under international rules because they occurred during an agreed cease fire meant to allow the U.N. to carry out a polio vaccination campaign. The Taliban voiced concerns that the U.N. made no condemnation of the breach by the Northern Alliance.
- April 25 - In an attempt to bolster the Afghani, the Islamic Emirate of Afghanistan banned the use of foreign currency to buy and sell goods.
- April 25 - The Islamic Emirate of Afghanistan foreign ministry accused the United Nations of being an enemy of Islam and of favoring the Northern Alliance.
- April 25 - The Islamic Emirate of Afghanistan and Iran signed a cooperation accord to check growing drug trafficking along their mutual border.
- April 26 - Under a decree by Supreme Leader Mulla Mohammed Omar, the Islamic Emirate of Afghanistan released approximately 300 opposition prisoners from the Pul-e-Charkhi prison in central Kabul. Many of those released were elderly. The decree was described as a goodwill gesture to mark the anniversary of the defeat of Afghanistan's communist government in 1992. About 1,500 prisoners remained in the jail.
- April 27 - The World Food Programme reported that the drought situation in Kandahar province and Zabul province were desperate. The Koochi people had lost up to 80% of their cattle and irrigation systems built to collect rainwater had dried up. Apricot and almond trees had withered and were without fruit. Camels were dying. Since February, the WFP had been feeding 30,000 families in the region and planned on adding another 10,000 families in May. The WFP was offering Afghans additional flour as an incentive if they remain in their villages.
- April 27 - In Afghanistan, Taliban forces thwarted Northern Alliance offensives on the Bagram Air Base, Kala Masroor, and Ghorband front, killing six and arresting 18.
- April 27 - In Kabul, Afghanistan, a 6-member Finnish parliamentary delegation visited the Afghan Foreign Minister Maulvi Wakil Ahmed Mutawakel.
- April 27 - The Islamic Emirate of Afghanistan was not invited to the two-day summit of the Economic Cooperation Organization (ECO) in Islamabad, Pakistan. Ministers met to discuss transportation and communication.
- April 27 - Dozens of Afghans awaiting the decision of their requests for asylum staged a demonstration in front of the Parliament House in Stockholm, Sweden. They called on officials to quicken their requests for immigration and positively respond to them.
- April 28 - Fransesc Vendrell, the United Nations Secretary General's special envoy for Afghanistan, visited Kabul to promote peace. Vendrell met with Afghan Foreign Minister Wakil Ahmed Muttawakil.
- April 28 - The United Nations Comprehensive Disabled Afghans Program launched an appeal for US$1 million extra funds for rehabilitation of 10,000 more landmine survivors in Afghanistan.
- April 30 - During talks with the Kazakhstani Prime Minister, Iranian Vice President Habibi said the situation in Afghanistan posed threats to the security of the neighboring nations.
- April 30 - Pakistani forces near South Waziristan prevented smugglers from bringing anti-aircraft guns, mortar guns and over shells into the country.

=== May ===
- May 1 - The annual U.S. report on international terrorism was released and named Afghanistan as posing a major terrorist threat, partly because it sheltered Osama bin Laden. The report also said that Pakistan refused to end support for groups that trained terrorists in Afghanistan and in Pakistan itself and that Pakistan did not close schools that serve as conduits for terrorism.
- May 1 - In a sports stadium in Mazar-i-Sharif, Afghanistan, before a crowd of several thousand spectators, a woman found guilty of committing adultery was stoned to death.
- May 1 - In Kunar province, Afghanistan, two Pakistani employees of the Bajaur Agency were killed and a third was injured when they resisted a robbery attempt.
- May 1 - More than 100 members of the Revolutionary Association of the Women of Afghanistan held a demonstration in Washington, DC condemning the Taliban.
- May 2 - Eric de Mul, the U.N. humanitarian coordinator for Afghanistan, made an urgent appeal for US$1.8 million for Afghan people affected by tremendous drought.
- May 2 - A magnitude 5.6 earthquake hit the mountainous border between Afghanistan and Tajikistan, 340 kilometres (210 mi) southeast of Dushanbe.
- May 2 - In Kabul, Afghanistan, Afghan foreign minister Maulvi Wakil Ahmed Mutawakel met with a Canadian delegation to discuss drugs, terrorism and human rights.
- May 3 - Northern Alliance leader Haji Abdul Qadeer admitted that one of their key commanders, Abdullah Jan Wahidi, had defected to the Taliban.
- Early May - Peace talks are held between representatives of the warring factions in Jeddah, Saudi Arabia. An earlier round of talks in March ended inconclusively.
- Mid-May - The Iranian government decides to secure the Iran-Afghanistan border with the construction of walls and high-security fencing along the almost 1,000 km stretch of desert.
- May 23 - Russia threatens air strikes against "terrorist training camps," in response to which the Taliban authorities warn neighbouring countries of retaliation if they play host to Russian forces launching such attacks. They also come to an agreement with the military authorities in Islamabad to close down camps training Pakistani nationals, and assure Tang Jiaxuan, Foreign Minister of the People's Republic of China, in late July that they will not tolerate Chinese Muslim extremists using Afghan territory for military training.

=== June ===
- Early June - The UN calls for immediate international drought relief of around U.S. $67 million to aid over 10 million people affected by severe droughts across Afghanistan.

=== July ===
- July 1 - Government forces clash with troops loyal to northern mujahideen commander Ahmad Shah Masood around Bagram airbase, just north of Kabul. Both sides claim to have inflicted heavy casualties.
- July 9 - Mary MacMakin, a U.S. aid worker in her 70s who has spent the last 30 years in Afghanistan, is arrested in Kabul on suspicion of espionage. The U.S. government calls the accusations "ridiculous."
- Mid-July - The Taliban authorities order the UN and foreign aid agencies to dismiss all Afghan women working for them.
- Mid- to late July 2000 - Kabul is hit by five bomb attacks in two weeks. The Taliban authorities accuse saboteurs of trying to create the impression of anarchy in the capital.
- Late July - The authorities announce the arrest of Commander Bashir Baghlani, a key Taliban leader in the northern regions, on suspicion of colluding with anti-government forces.
- July 27 - The Taliban issued a decree banning opium poppy cultivation.
- July 31 - The Taliban authorities announce that the severe drought affecting much of the country was God's punishment for the people's neglect of their religious beliefs.

=== September ===
- Early September - Despite encouraging hints of peace initiatives brokered by neighbouring Turkmenistan in late August, Taliban forces press on with their attack on the opposition Northern Alliance's northeast supply routes, taking the key town of Taloqan after heavy fighting.
- September - The Taliban regime steps up its efforts to gain diplomatic and UN recognition, having reinforced its claims to effective control of the country thanks to military successes in the northeast. The U.S. sustains its criticisms over drug trafficking, support for terrorism, and a "deplorable human rights record," although State Department officials do meet Taliban representatives in Washington, D.C., on September 29 to discuss these issues.
- Mid-September - Around 150,000 people are said to be heading for the sealed border with Tajikistan in the wake of the successful advance of Taliban forces in the north of the country. The refugees include almost the entire population of Taloqan.
- Mid-September - Although Afghanistan remains the world's biggest producer of opium, the UN drug control agency announces that the country's crop for 2000 appears to be 30% smaller than that harvested in 1999. Despite the agency's program to convince local farmers to grow other crops, the fall may be solely due to the terrible drought affecting the region.
- Mid-September - The Taliban authorities announce that traders arriving from Pakistan will be allowed to transport their goods through Afghanistan without paying customs duties. Taliban deputy commerce minister Faiz Faizan also says that any foreigners are welcome to invest in the country tax-free.

=== October ===
- October 10 - A three-day cease-fire is called to allow UN medical officers to continue providing polio vaccinations for children displaced by the fighting. A massive campaign to immunize approximately 4.5 million children in Afghanistan, one of only 30 countries where the disease still exists, began in early June.
- Late October - A ban on the farming of opium poppy, from which heroin is derived, starts to be implemented by the Taliban authorities. The fatwa against opium poppy cultivation had been pronounced in July 2000, after which followed a period when local shuras disseminated the information among the population. Finally, in October 2000 the shuras started the enforcement of the opium cultivation ban.

=== November ===
- Mid-November - Commander Mahmoud Surkha of the Northern Alliance defects to the Taliban claiming dissatisfaction with Russian interference in the resistance movement. The Northern Alliance denies the allegation but says that it has the right to seek international assistance as the recognized government of Afghanistan.
- Late November - Kazakhstan becomes the latest Central Asian country to relax its attitude to the Taliban regime when it announces it will establish regular contact with the Islamic administration. Turkmenistan and Uzbekistan have already expressed a willingness to talk to the regime.

=== December ===
- Mid-December - Fearing a violent response to a UN resolution tightening international sanctions against the Taliban regime, non-Afghan UN staff are gradually withdrawn from the country, resulting in their complete absence in Afghanistan from December 19.
- December 19 - The UN Security Council adopts Resolution 1333 that expands the regime of anti-Taliban sanctions imposed by Resolution 1267 back in 1999. The key drivers behind the new Resolution are Russia and the US. UN Secretary General, UN relief officials and some analysts like Barnett Rubin express disappointment with the severity of the imposed sanctions.
- Late December 2000 - The return of exiled opposition leader Karim Khalili from Iran prompts a new offensive by the Northern Alliance in north-central Afghanistan. The governing Taliban regime admits it has temporarily lost control of the central town of Yakawlang, near Bamyan, but denies opposition claims of further gains in neighbouring Ghor Province.
- December 30 - Anti-Taliban Shi'a Islam groups Wahdat-i-Islami and Harakat-i-Islami captured the Yakaolang District in Bamyan Province, Afghanistan.
