= Drug trafficking organizations =

Type of criminal organization

Drug trafficking organizations are defined by the United States Department of Justice as, "complex organizations with highly defined command-and-control structures that produce, transport, and/or distribute large quantity "Law enforcement reporting indicates that Mexican DTOs maintain drug distribution networks, or supply drugs to distributors, in at least 230 U.S. cities." The use of weapons and fear are commonplace in trafficking which often lead to other crimes in the process. The structures of many of these organizations are of a para-military nature using armed combatants to protect their stock of illegal drugs from growth to delivery.

== History ==
In 1914, the Harrison Narcotic Act was passed by congress making a medical prescription necessary for products with high levels of opiate or narcotics. With laws against the use of un-prescribed drugs such as opium, cocaine, morphine, and heroin now in effect, the black market grew to continue supply to addicted or prospective users. Rising domestic enforcement of illegal growing and production operations, coupled with increasing legislation against illegal drugs, forced suppliers outside the country. Drug trafficking organizations from nations with lesser, or no drug laws emerged with the opportunity to make large profits from illegal trafficking into the United States. These organized crime syndicates would use any means necessary to exploit the weak border protection of the US. The drugs were shipped, flown, and trucked into the country and distributed from within. In many cases, "American mercenaries provided their services as pilots making trips between over 150 clandestine landing strips in South America and the US. In a 1986 Report from the President's Commission on Organized Crime, it was believed that nearly 2/3 of the cocaine from Colombia was flown into the country." Rampant drug epidemics and rising gang dealing would eventually lead to a massive operationalization of drug enforcement. The US formed federal agencies and initiatives such as the "Drug Enforcement Administration (DEA) in 1973, and High Intensity Drug Trafficking Area centers with the Anti-Drug Abuse Act of 1988, coordinating efforts to slow the flow across borders and within the country." These agencies, along with academics, would formally define the groups that traffic drugs and study their operations.

== Organization and structure ==
=== Structure ===
Over the past few decades, drug trafficking organizations have increased in number and diversified in structure. They range from family based operations in which secrecy is essential, and where trafficking of large shipments are discreetly sent to associates across the border, to organizations involving hundreds of players with different roles. This varying structure can often make it difficult to identify the groups as each has a different MO and scale. In 1998, Mangai Natarajan, a professor at John Jay College of Criminal Justice, "studied court records of 39 trafficking organizations in New York City to classify drug syndicates into four main types. "Freelance" networks are composed of small nonhierarchical entrepreneurial groupings of individuals; "family businesses" are cohesive organizations with clear structure and authority and trust based on family ties; "communal businesses" are flexible organizations bound together by a common tie such as ethnicity, religion, nationality, or neighborhood residence; and "corporations" are large organizations in which there is a formal hierarchy and a well-defined division of labor." While these "corporations" are obviously the most organized, they often take years of investigation to trace up to the head operator. Many times these organizations are run from outside the country and therefore extradition and conflicting laws may prohibit the investigation. Another perspective argues that DTOs are politico-military groups that operate in failed states and have political agendas. Situations such as Mexico and Afghanistan today may support this claim, and perhaps, extend further connecting funds to terrorist groups.

=== Mexican DTOs ===
Mexican drug trafficking organizations have taken control of the US market in recent years, superseding Dominican and Colombian groups that held it for decades. These groups began as hierarchical with clear and defined leadership and a ladder of command down to the street dealer. In response to increasing law enforcement efforts and understanding of this system, many Mexican DTOs have shifted their command structure to an equally organized, but more independent system of decentralized cells. According to a High Intensity Drug Trafficking Areas Initiative (HIDTA) in the Midwest, the Mexican DTOs have "compartmentalized duties, employed advanced security and communications techniques, gathered intelligence, and used violence and intimidation to control organization members and secure smuggling territories." With a state of virtual lawlessness, futile domestic enforcement efforts, and rampant corruption fueled by the drug money, Mexico has grown into a massive drug producer. Production is unmatched when it comes to marihuana, heroin, and cocaine with methamphetamines an increasing trend.

=== Colombian and Dominican DTOs ===
Colombian and Dominican DTOs operate in hierarchical command structures and often launder money into non-drug legitimate industries such as real estate and high income businesses as an investigation by ICE learned in 2010 where a multibillion-dollar Colombian DTO was taken down. Controlling the US market for many years, these groups established undetectable transportation techniques and became deeply connected to domestic gangs. The insurgence of Mexican DTOs has brought increased violence and competition for large cities and territory control. Heroin and cocaine are the primary drugs produced in the countries which have been under the control of cartels for decades.

=== Asian DTOs ===
Asian DTOs have filled in the gaps left by the major players by producing and trafficking MDMA known commonly on the street as ecstasy or X. "While once a competitive supplier of heroin, the groups have avoided strife by targeting the high potency marijuana market growing in both Canada and the US to avoid border raids."

== Impact of DTOs ==
=== Finance, violence and terrorism ===
While an exact financial figure is not known to US authorities, DTOs are believed to make tens of billions of dollars annually depending on size of the organization. With this staggering income from illegal trade, the longevity and persistence of these organizations is understandable. For groups based in economically struggling regions, the illegal trafficking of drugs is a tempting and extremely profitable illegitimate business with little domestic risk. A variety of methods are used to conceal and move the cash made from the network of drug deals. Money laundering techniques involve the wiring and constant movement of funds from different banks and accounts. This technique makes tracking the money more difficult, and can cost banks millions in losses each year. Aside from financial detriment, these groups can be very violent extending their police record to countless offences. In a constant struggle for territory and control of the market, DTOs will not hesitate to use deadly force against rival organizations, or threats to their business. The use of automatic weapons, threats, and bribery are common in maintaining control. "Narcoterrorism" is not a new threat but has become a domestic fear for the US after the attacks on September 11. With the formation of terrorism task forces and intelligence community initiatives, a greater understanding of the relationship between drug trade and terrorism has taken place.

Many terrorist organizations have the drug trade as their major income - for instance the Taliban controlled 96% of Afghanistan's poppy fields and made opium its largest source of taxation which became one of the mainstays of Taliban income and their war economy. According to Rashid, "drug money funded the weapons, ammunition and fuel for the war." In The New York Times, the Finance Minister of the United Front, Wahidullah Sabawoon, declared the Taliban had no annual budget but that they "appeared to spend US$300 million a year, nearly all of it on war." He added that the Taliban had come to increasingly rely on three sources of money: "poppy, the Pakistanis and bin Laden." According to Alfred McCoy, during the Cold War the CIA provided Afghan drug lord allies such as Gulbuddin Hekmatyar with transport, arms, and political protection in the fight against Soviet forces in Afghanistan. According to Loretta Napoleoni terrorism later shifted from being mainly state sponsored to gaining financial independence from their sponsors and becoming self-financed.

In a CBS news article, the Chief of Operations for the US Drug Enforcement Administration Michael Braun called "groups like the FARC, the Taliban, Hamas and Hezbollah: "hybrids" stating that they are one part terrorist organization, and are becoming one part global drug trafficking cartel." With this new "hybrid" threat, the violence aimed at political impact meets the already violent world of drug trafficking in a perfect storm. These narco-terrorist groups have been linked to car bombings, hostage situations, and mass killings of police and politicians which opposed the operation and could perhaps pose the greatest threat to the US in the future.

=== Gang involvement ===
Operationally, DTOs rely on street gangs to distribute the product to their customers. This collaboration supports turf wars between rival gangs like the Bloods and Crips that ensures their participation in the drug trade. These gangs which make headlines daily, rely on the illegal drug trade to support their gangs across the US. The money generated by this process, among other factors, draws youth into the gang lifestyle continuing the cycle of violence on the street.

== Combating drug trafficking organizations ==
=== Enforcement ===
With emerging involvement in these organizations, law enforcement agencies from all levels have stepped up operations against high intensity drug trafficking. Beginning with Vice units in Florida and other border states, law enforcement has grown exponentially in counter narcotics. Currently there is a large network of agencies, police, military, initiatives, and even private sector involvement to combat DTOs. Federal agencies such as the DEA, FBI, ICE, Border Patrol, and the National Guard, work independently and cohesively to analyze and investigate organizations with the most impact. These agencies are dependent on local and state law enforcement officers who have the street interactions with members of the drug world. This data is collected and disseminated to initiatives such as HIDTAs which were formed as switchboards for drug intel in target regions of the US. With the combined knowledge and improving technology in networks and analysis, law enforcement efforts find greater success in dismantling organizations in the US.

=== Public health ===
Another approach has been initiated using campaigns for anti drug use in an attempt to reduce the demand for illegal drugs from within. This public health approach utilized TV programs and advertisements, as well as D.A.R.E. programs which are aimed at youth with the hope of prevention before enforcement.
