= 1999 in Afghanistan =

- Decades: 1970s; 1980s; 1990s; 2000s; 2010s
- See also: Other events of 1999; List of years in Afghanistan

The following lists events that happened during 1999 in Afghanistan.

== Incumbents ==
- De facto head of state: Mohammed Omar
- President: Burhanuddin Rabbani

== Events ==
=== February ===
- February 13 - America's public enemy number one, Osama Bin Laden, is reported missing by his Taliban hosts in Afghanistan.

=== May ===
- May 9 - The Taliban movement says that its forces have retaken the key central town of Bamyan from the opposition alliance.

=== June ===
- June 20 - The Red Cross pulls non-essential foreign staff out of Afghanistan after 10 of its workers were beaten.

=== July ===
- July 6 - U.S. President Bill Clinton imposes financial and commercial sanctions on Afghanistan's ruling Taliban movement because of its support of Saudi terrorism suspect Osama Bin Laden.
- July 19 - The U.S. assistant secretary of state for South Asia, Karl Inderfurth, tells Taliban Information Minister Mullah Amir Khan Muttaqi that the U.S. would be forced to take further actions if Osama bin Laden is not brought to justice.
- July 19 - The Six plus Two Group on Afghanistan adopted the Tashkent Declaration, in which the members pledged not to provide arms to any party in the Afghan conflict and not to allow the use of their territory for such purpose.
- July 28 - Thousands of Taliban fighters launch an offensive to crush Ahmad Shah Masood, the last hurdle between the Islamic militia and control of the whole of Afghanistan. This July Offensive was condemned in an October Presidential Statement of the UN Security Council. The UN Secretary General specifically pointed out that the offensive was reinforced by thousands of recruits from religious schools in Pakistan.

=== August ===
- August 1 - Taliban fighters seize opposition leader Ahmad Shah Masood's key Bagram airbase in an offensive to establish total dominance of Afghanistan; anti-Taliban fighters recapture the airbase on August 5.
- August 31 - Afghan Northern Alliance leaders, including Ahmad Shah Masood, General Sayed Husain Anwari, Ustad Sayaf and Yonnus Qanooni, met in the Panjsher Valley of Afghanistan to plan the establishment of a central Afghan bank and the recreation of close to a dozen ministries.

=== September ===
- September 1 - Afghan Northern Alliance Spokesman General Sayed Anwari announced his forces made gains against the Taliban in Jozjan and Alaghan, killing commander Maulavi Ismael, pushed the Taliban from the districts of Aqgunbad, Tonjgola and Gosfandi, and captured the district of Gordara in Samangan province.
- September 1 - Afghan Health Minister Mulla Mohammad Abbas Akhund met with Pakistani Health Minister Javed Hashmi and Pakistani Director of General Health Ghayur Ayub to discuss the lack of medical facilities in Afghanistan.
- September 2 - The Afghan Northern Alliance rejected Pakistan's peace efforts and planned to work further with the six-plus-two nations.
- September 2 - In Washington, D.C., U.S. United States Assistant Secretary of State for South Asia Karl Inderfurth and Indian senior officials Alok Prasad and Vivek Katju met to discuss Afghanistan.
- Late September - The Taliban issued a decree calling for a one-third reduction in the cultivation of opium over the 1999–2000 season, a 50% reduction of cultivation in some districts in Nangarhar, and a complete ban on cultivation on the lands owned by the Taliban itself. In July 2000, the Taliban would move further, instituting a total opium cultivation ban.

=== October ===
- October 22 - United States Assistant Secretary of State for South Asia Karl Inderfurth told Congress that the US is “Prepared to work with the Taliban to rid Afghanistan of terrorist networks,” if it would hand over bin Laden to American authorities.
- October 27 - Mullah Wakil Ahmed Muttawakil is named foreign minister in the Taliban government, replacing Mullah Mohammad Hassan. Mullah Abdul Razzaq is made interior minister, replacing Mullah Khairullah Khairkhwa, who is appointed as governor of the western province of Herat.
- October 29 - Saudi-born terrorism suspect Osama bin Laden is reported to have sought safe passage from the Taliban's Afghanistan to an unknown country.

=== November ===
- November 14 - UN sanctions against Afghanistan under Resolution 1267 go into force, imposed for not handing over Saudi dissident Osama Bin Laden.

=== December ===
- December 25 - Hijacked Indian Airlines Flight 814 lands in Afghanistan at the Kandahar Airport.
- December 31 - The passengers of Flight 814 are freed and the hijackers are given 10 hours to leave Afghanistan by the Taliban.
