= 1996 in Afghanistan =

- Decades: 1970s; 1980s; 1990s; 2000s; 2010s
- See also: Other events of 1996; List of years in Afghanistan

The following lists events that happened during 1996 in Afghanistan.

== Incumbents ==
- De facto head of state: Mohammed Omar
- President: Burhanuddin Rabbani
- Prime Minister: Ahmad Shah Ahmadzai (until 26 June), Gulbuddin Hekmatyar (starting 26 June)
- Vice President: Mohammad Nabi Mohammadi (left)

== Events ==
=== April ===
- April 3 – About 1,000 Muslim clergymen elect Taliban leader Mohammed Omar as amir al-momineen (commander of the faithful), denouncing Rabbani as unfit to lead the Islamic nation.

=== May ===
- May 18 – the Taliban provided protection to Al-Qaeda's leader Osama bin Laden after relocating to Afghanistan following his expulsion from Sudan.

=== June ===
- June 26 – Hekmatyar, whose Hezb-i-Islami forces have bombarded the government in Kabul until driven from their positions by the Taliban, is sworn in again as prime minister. He immediately attempts to open contacts with northern Afghanistan's powerful warlord, General Dostum. From his power base in Mazari Sharif, Dostum continues to control a virtually independent northern Afghanistan. On July 3 President Rabbani names a 10-man cabinet under Prime Minister Hekmatyar. Foreign minister: Abdul Rahim Ghafoorzai; defense: Waheedullah Sabawoon; finance: Abdul Hadi Arghandiwal; interior: Mohammad Yunus Qanuni.

=== September ===
- September 5 – The Taliban launch a rapid offensive in eastern Afghanistan. Their forces capture the city of Jalalabad, together with important areas in Nangarhar and Laghman provinces. With these territorial advances most of Afghanistan's traditionally Pashtun homelands are united under Taliban control. The gains include Kabul's main road to Pakistan and seal the fate of Rabbani's mostly Tajik government.
- September 27 – The long power struggle between Afghanistan's armed factions takes a decisive turn when Taliban militias enter Kabul, where they meet little resistance from government forces. The Taliban's first act is to execute the last Democratic Republic of Afghanistan president Mohammad Najibullah along with his brother Shahpur Ahmadzai. Najibullah had been living inside a United Nations compound in Kabul since 1992. The new state, the Islamic Emirate of Afghanistan was recognized only by three UN member states: Pakistan, Saudi Arabia and the United Arab Emirates.

=== October ===
- October 4 – In Almaty, Kazakhstan, Russia and four other Central Asian countries adopted a declaration expressing concern regarding the conflict in Afghanistan, assessing it as a direct threat to the Commonwealth of Independent States.

=== November ===
- November 11 – In Tehran, Iran, Afghanistan's ousted president Burhanuddin Rabbani arrived for talks with high-ranking Iranian officials to discuss developments in Afghanistan.

=== December ===
- December 2 – The season's first snowfall in Badghis Province, Afghanistan severely hampered fighting between Taliban and Afghan Northern Alliance forces, and halted humanitarian relief efforts.
- December 3 -
  - Former Afghan head of state Babrak Karmal died in Moscow, Russia.
  - Ehsanullah Ehsan, the chairman of the Taliban's Central Bank, declared most Afghani notes in circulation to be worthless and cancelled the contract with the Russian firm that had been printing the currency since 1992. Ehsan accused the firm of sending new shipments of Afghani notes to ousted president Burhanuddin Rabbani in northern Takhar Province.
  - In Kabul, Mazari Sharif, Geneva and New York the United Nations launched its fifth annual appeal for $133 million in humanitarian aid to Afghanistan, but warned Taliban leaders that policies toward conduct of women would have to change.
  - In Jalalabad, Afghanistan, the local Department for Promoting the Good and Suppressing the Bad issued a directive prohibiting taxi drivers from giving rides to women wearing chadors.
  - UNICEF announced that it would stop funding education projects in Kabul, Afghanistan if girls were not allowed by the Taliban to go to school.
- December 4 -
  - In Mazari Sharif, Afghanistan faction leader Gulbuddin Hekmatyar joined the anti-Taliban Afghan Northern Alliance formed by ousted president Burhanuddin Rabbani and northern militia leader General Abdul Rashid Dostum.
  - In Kabul, Afghanistan, Radio Shariat (Radio Islamic Law) announced that women should be covered from head to foot.
- December 5 -
  - In Tehran, Iran, Afghanistan's ousted president Burhanuddin Rabbani arrived for talks with President Akbar Hashemi Rafsanjani to discuss developments in Afghanistan.
  - The Taliban punished 225 women for violating Taliban clothing rules, and punished several men for violating Taliban beard rules. The men were advised to "grow thick beards and small moustaches within one and a half months."
- December 6 -
  - In Istalif, Afghanistan enemy troops pounded Taliban positions with heavy artillery and rockets, prompting Taliban troops to pull out of the village.
  - United Nations special envoy Norbert Holl met with Taliban Foreign Minister Mullah Mohammed Ghous.
  - A Russian military airplane transported the body of former Afghan President Babrak Karmal to Mazari Sharif to be buried.
- December 7 -
  - A United Nations 10-seater Beechcraft airplane carrying Tajik opposition leader Sayid Abdulloh Nuri and seven other Tajik passengers from Mashhad, Iran to Taloqan, Afghanistan was intercepted by Taliban aircraft and forced to land in Shindand.
  - Pakistani Foreign Secretary Najmuddin Shaikh met with rebel forces in Mazari Sharif, Afghanistan.
- December 8 -
  - In Shindand, Afghanistan, the Taliban released the United Nations a 10-seater Beechcraft airplane they had forced to land the previous day, and had it flown to Taliban headquarters in Kandahar for repairs rather than allowing it to complete its flight to Kunduz.
  - Taliban officials met with Pakistani Foreign Secretary Najmuddin ShaikhThe subject discussed as during Mr. Shaikh's meeting with Dostum and Dr. Abdullah in Mazar Sharif a day earlier was the working out of ceasefire arrangements between the contending factions in Afghanistan and suggesting talks with the Northern Alliance for the formation of a coalition government
  - Taliban leadership nominated Abdul Hakeem Mujahed as Afghanistan's ambassador to the United Nations.
  - In Kunduz, Afghanistan, United Nations special envoy Norbert Holl met with ousted commander Ahmad Shah Massoud to discuss U.N. proposals for an Afghan ceasefire, the demilitarization of Kabul, and the formation of a neutral Afghan Police Force.
- December 10 – In Kandahar, Afghanistan, United Nations special envoy Norbert Holl with senior Taliban officials.
- December 12 – In Mazari Sharif, Afghanistan, United Nations special envoy Norbert Holl met with rebel leader General Abdul Rashid Dostum.

== Births ==
- July 7 – Zekeria Ebrahimi, actor
