= Six plus Three =

Six plus Three ("6+3") Initiative is a proposal of Uzbekistan, aimed at peaceful resolution of the Afghan conflict with participation of the six neighbouring countries to Afghanistan, plus the United States, the Russian Federation and NATO as main anti-terrorist actor in Afghanistan.

== Background ==
The initiative was proposed by Uzbek leader Islam Karimov during NATO/EAPC Summit in Bucharest in April 2008. During his speech, Islam Karimov proposed five dimensions of stabilization of the situation in Afghanistan.

First: resolution of social and economic problems, tackling with the issues of employment of population and strengthening the authority of power. This may serve for the aim of resolving the issue of drug production and trafficking, strengthening the trust of indigenous population towards the international coalition forces.

Second: ensuring respect to religious and cultural values, customs and traditions of the multinational people of Afghanistan, including minorities.

Third: step by step reforms in the sphere of state construction and establishing the civil institutions.

Fourth: resolution of border problems of neighbouring Pakistan.

Fifth: reviving "6 plus 2" Contact Group, which functioned in 1997–2001 under the auspices of the United Nations. The Uzbek leader proposed to transform it to "6 plus 3" by including North Atlantic Treaty Organization, taking into account its anti-terrorist operations on Afghan land.

So, the initiative foresees participation of the six countries surrounding Afghanistan:

- China
- Iran
- Pakistan
- Tajikistan
- Turkmenistan
- Uzbekistan

and three other parties:

- United States
- Russia
- NATO

John C.K. Daly, fellow researcher of the Central Asia-Caucasus Institute at the Johns Hopkins University in Washington, in his recent article "Uzbek Afghanistan proposal relevant and timely - Afghanistan: Why "6 plus 3"?", published on 5 November 2009 underlines the importance of the current proposal by Uzbekistan.
