= 1993 in Afghanistan =

- Decades: 1970s; 1980s; 1990s; 2000s; 2010s
- See also: Other events of 1993; List of years in Afghanistan

The following lists events that happened during 1993 in Afghanistan.

Afghanistan remains a battleground, with rival factions fighting for power and pounding the capital with rockets. An estimated 10,000 people are killed, 750,000 are displaced, and many neighbourhoods in Kabul are devastated. Although the fighting lessens somewhat in the latter half of 1993, it is still unclear if the nation ultimately will be governable. Meanwhile, Najibullah, who received a promise of safe passage from the UN when it negotiated his abdication, remains in the UN office in Kabul, suffering from a kidney ailment. The UN has been unable to secure his freedom. Continuing hostilities also delay the homecoming of an estimated 3.8 million refugees in Iran and Pakistan, the largest refugee population in the world. The UN believes it will take until the end of 1995 for the 1.5 million Afghans remaining in Pakistan to return home. Afghanistan is the world's largest opium grower, according to the UN, having produced an estimated 2,000 tons in 1992. This is a concern not only for the West, where the production fuels the illegal heroin trade, but also at home, where it is estimated that 15% of all adult Afghan males age 15-40 are addicted to hard drugs.

== Incumbents ==
- President: Burhanuddin Rabbani
- Prime Minister: Gulbuddin Hekmatyar (starting 17 June)
- Vice President: Mawlawi Mir Hamza (left) then Mohammad Nabi Mohammadi (along with Mohammad Shah Fazli)

== March ==
After Hekmatyar's forces captured Defense Minister Masood's ministry building in Kabul, which they were shelling for a year, a peace accord is signed. Hekmatyar is designated prime minister and a cease-fire is to be imposed.

== May 20 ==
Despite continuing fighting among the various rebel leaders - principally between government forces under Masood and Hezb-i-Islami faction troops loyal to fundamentalist Hekmatyar - a 22-member cabinet is named. Acceding to Hekmatyar's demands, the cease-fire agreement called for the Defense Ministry to be run by a commission under President Rabbani. Other cabinet posts are divided among the 10 major rebel groups, including Mohammad Yunus Khalis' breakaway faction of the Hezb-i-Islami, which has boycotted all past agreements. Afghanistan's minority Shi`ites, allies of Hekmatyar who have been demanding greater representation, are given the finance and health ministries.

== Mid-June ==
Hekmatyar ventures into Kabul for the first time since 1992. On June 17 he is formally sworn in as prime minister in a low-key ceremony in a village outside Kabul.

== August ==
Prime Minister Hekmatyar visits Tehran and returns with a pledge that Iran will help repair roads destroyed in the war and help Afghanistan look for oil and gas. In the same month, Afghanistan says that it will not return Stinger missile launchers supplied by the U.S. to anti-Soviet rebels during the 1978–92 war. Washington wanted to buy back the antiaircraft weapons to keep them from falling into the hands of terrorists.

== September 27 ==
The state-controlled Kabul radio reports that the Afghan leadership, after five days of negotiations, has approved an interim constitution and that elections would be held in 1994.
