= 1997 in Afghanistan =

- Decades: 1970s; 1980s; 1990s; 2000s; 2010s
- See also: Other events of 1997; List of years in Afghanistan

The following lists events that happened during 1997 in Afghanistan.

== Incumbents ==
Islamic Emirate of Afghanistan (Taliban government)

Mostly unrecognized, controlling about two-thirds of the country.

- De facto head of state: Mohammed Omar

Islamic State of Afghanistan (Northern Alliance government)

Internationally recognized, controlling about one-third of the country.

- President: Burhanuddin Rabbani
- Prime Minister: Gulbuddin Hekmatyar (until 11 August), Abdul Rahim Ghafoorzai (11 August-18 August)

== Events ==
=== May ===
- May 24 - Opposition warlord Dostum is ousted from his fiefdom in northern Afghanistan by a combined assault of Taliban fighters and followers of Gen. Abdul Malik, who switched sides to the Taliban. The Taliban forces and their new allies capture Kunduz, Baghlan and Samangan provinces, now controlling 26 of the 32 provinces. Dostum flees to Turkey, vowing to continue his struggle. Malik promises a strict Islamic regime in the northern areas under his control, centred on Mazari Sharif, which was the last major city to hold out against the Taliban. On May 25 Pakistan becomes the first country to recognize the Taliban government. On May 28, however, Malik turns against the Taliban again, and the Taliban are driven out of Mazari Sharif in a bloody battle in which several thousand of them are taken captive.

=== June ===
- June 13 - The Taliban leadership names a new foreign minister, Mullah Abdul Jalil, to replace Mullah Mohammad Ghous, who was taken prisoner by opposition forces in late May.

=== July ===
- July 24 - Opposition forces come within 20 km of Kabul, within rocket range. Aid workers leave.
- July 30 - The Taliban tighten regulations in Kabul, punishing over 700 people for breaking Islamic laws forbidding women from working outside their homes and men from trimming beards.

=== August ===
- August 7 - Aid workers return to Kabul, but are hampered by Taliban rules limiting access to women.
- August 11 - Following an initiative by the UN special representative in Afghanistan, Norbert Holl, to build a broad-based government, the opposition names a new administration lineup, including Abdul Rahim Ghafoorzai as prime minister, Abdul Malik Pahlawan as foreign minister, and Ahmad Shah Masood as defense minister. Burhanuddin Rabbani is to remain as president. The Hezb-i-Islami faction of former prime minister Hekmatyar denounces the new cabinet without any Hezb representation and based in the northern town of Mazari Sharif as designed to divide Afghanistan. In fact, this government is little more than a cover for the northern alliance's military effort to retake Kabul. The reinvigorated northern alliance of Malik's and Masood's forces plus Hazara Shi`ite militias push the Taliban back to within a few kilometres of Kabul.
- August 14 - The US State Department ordered the Afghan embassy in Washington closed because of a dispute between Rabbani and Taliban supporters among the embassy staff.
- August 21 - Ghafoorzai dies in a plane crash. Abdul Ghafoor Rawan Farhadi later replaces him as prime minister.

=== September ===
- September 9 - Fighting rages outside Mazari Sharif after the Taliban try again to take the city.
- September 20 - Over 70 aid workers and dependants evacuate Mazari Sharif after their premises are ransacked and looted.
- September 29 - The Taliban arrest European Union Commissioner for Humanitarian Affairs Emma Bonino, EU delegates, and journalists for taking pictures in a women's hospital in Kabul. They are released the same day.

=== October ===
- October 14 - Dostum returns to Mazari Sharif from exile in Turkey.
- October 26 - The Taliban change the name of the country to Islamic Emirate of Afghanistan, underlining the importance of Taliban leader Mullah Mohammad Omar, who is known as amir al-momineen (Leader of the Faithful), although his constitutional position remains unclear. Although controlling about two-thirds of the country, the Taliban have only been recognized by three countries - Pakistan, Saudi Arabia, and the United Arab Emirates - as the legitimate rulers of Afghanistan. Afghanistan's seat in the UN is occupied by representatives of the administration of Burhanuddin Rabbani that has been ousted from Kabul 13 months ago, while the Organization of the Islamic Conference declared Afghanistan's seat vacant.

=== November ===
- November 2 - Malik is routed by Dostum and forced to flee.
