= 1998 in Afghanistan =

- Decades: 1970s; 1980s; 1990s; 2000s; 2010s
- See also: Other events of 1998; List of years in Afghanistan

The following lists events that happened during 1998 in Afghanistan.

== Incumbents ==
- De facto head of state: Mohammed Omar
- President: Burhanuddin Rabbani

== February 4, 1998 ==
- The 5.9 M_{w} Afghanistan earthquake shook the northeastern portion of the country with a maximum Mercalli intensity of VII (Very strong). This strike-slip shock left 2,323 dead and 818 injured in the Takhar Province. A 6.5 M_{w} earthquake affected the same region on May 30, claiming 4,000 lives

== April 1998 ==
US ambassador to the UN Bill Richardston visited Afghanistan and asked the Taliban to surrender Bin Laden for trial, but the Taliban refused the request.

== July 8, 1998 ==
- The Taliban movement gives Afghans 15 days to get rid of their television sets, video players, and satellite receivers. The Taliban has anyway put a stop to television broadcasts in the two-thirds of the country it controls. But Maulvi Qalamuddin, the Taliban deputy minister in charge of its Department for Prevention of Vice and Promotion of Virtue, said people continued to watch video tapes and foreign television channels received via satellite dishes. He said watching video tapes and satellite television broadcasts was inadmissible in Islam, damaging to morals, and caused mental disorders.

== July 12, 1998 ==
- The Taliban capture the key opposition stronghold of Maimana, capital of Faryab province in the northwest.

== July 21, 1998 ==
- 140 detainees were released in Afghanistan under the auspices of the International Committee of the Red Cross. Half of the detainees were being held by Taliban authorities in Kandahar and the other half by authorities of the Northern Alliance in Panshir.

== August 2, 1998 ==
- The opposition alliance admits the loss of the key northern town of Sheberghan to the Taliban. The entire province of Sar-i-Pul falls on August 4.

== August 7, 1998 ==
- United States embassies in Kenya and Tanzania were bombed. Some 250 people were killed in the blasts and thousands more wounded. Osama bin Laden was the primary suspect.

== August 8, 1998 ==
- The Taliban capture the northern opposition capital Mazar-i-Sharif. On August 11, they capture Taloqan, the Takhar provincial capital, the latest in a series of spectacular victories.

== August 20, 1998 ==
- The United States carried out preemptive missile attacks in eastern Afghanistan on suspected terrorist training camps allegedly run by Saudi dissident Osama bin Laden.

== August 21, 1998 ==
- United States President Bill Clinton signed an executive order freezing the accounts of Osama bin Laden. Bin Laden was also placed on the FBI most wanted list, and a reward of US$5 million was offered for his capture. An Italian army officer working for the United Nations is shot dead in Kabul. All foreigners working for the UN in Afghanistan are evacuated.

== September 3, 1998 ==
- 70,000 Iranian troops engaged in war exercise near the border of Afghanistan.
- In Taloqan, Afghanistan, Taliban aircraft dropped several cluster bombs on a market, killing nine people, including a foreign journalist.

== September 10, 1998 ==
- The Taliban movement says it has found the bodies of nine Iranian diplomats whose disappearance sparked tension with neighbouring Iran; two survivors return to Iran.

== September 13, 1998 ==
- The Taliban militia says its fighters have captured the central Shi`ite town of Bamiyan, the last major opposition stronghold in Afghanistan. On September 14, Iran's Ayatollah Ali Khamenei warns the Taliban and Pakistan that their actions could provoke a major regional conflict.

== September 19, 1998 ==
- A senior U.S. diplomat told a top Taliban official in Islamabad, Pakistan that the militia would be held responsible for any new terror strikes by Osama bin Laden.

== September 21, 1998 ==
- Anti-Taliban forces shell Kabul with rockets for a second day, bringing the death toll to over 70 people.

== October 8, 1998 ==
- Iran inflicts "heavy casualties" in a first armed clash with Afghan Taliban forces after weeks of tension between the hostile neighbours.

== October 12, 1998 ==
- The last three bodies of Iranian diplomats killed by Afghan Taliban militiamen are flown back to Tehran.

== October 23, 1998 ==
- The UN and the Taliban movement sign an agreement paving the way for the return of UN international staff to Afghanistan.
