= Norbert Holl =

German diplomat

Norbert Holl is a German diplomat who served as Head of the United Nations special mission to Afghanistan from 1996 to 1997. He resigned from the position on December 29, 1997.
