= 1995 in Afghanistan =

- Decades: 1970s; 1980s; 1990s; 2000s; 2010s
- See also: Other events of 1995; List of years in Afghanistan

The following lists events that happened during 1995 in Afghanistan.

The Taliban bring a degree of calm to parts of Afghanistan, in part by neutralizing several powerful leaders and their supporters. The dispute over control of Kabul is not resolved, however, and regions of the country remain divided. Most ordinary Afghans, particularly in traditionally Pashtun areas of the country, welcome the sudden and effective success of the Taliban. Drug trafficking and lawlessness are targeted, and religious conformity is enforced. The latter includes severe restrictions on women's appearance in public and especially on their access to education and employment. Public executions and amputations are used to enforce Islamic behaviour. In northwestern Afghanistan Dostum continues to strengthen his independent position in Mazar-i-Sharif. With the destruction of Kabul, almost two-thirds of Afghanistan's total population is living in territory controlled by the Uzbek general. With a well-equipped army of 60,000, he continues to build economic and diplomatic relations with Afghanistan's neighbours. For Pakistan and Iran, Dostum's authority promises stable trade links to Central Asia, where he is seen as insurance against the threat of Islamic fundamentalism.

President Rabbani, whose extended term expired at the end of December, offers to relinquish power if an acceptable replacement could be found. Efforts by Mestiri and other UN mediators to bring the contending factions together and select a successor to Rabbani come to naught. The military-political situation is so unstable that serious negotiations are impossible.

== Incumbents ==
- President: Burhanuddin Rabbani
- Prime Minister: Arsala Rahmani Daulat (until), Ahmad Shah Ahmadzai (starting)
- Vice President: Mohammad Nabi Mohammadi

== February ==
Taliban forces have moved into central Afghanistan, where they occupy the headquarters of Hekmatyar's Hezb-i-Islami. Hekmatyar has been bombarding Kabul in an effort to drive Rabbani from office, but when he is forced to flee, he abandons large stocks of heavy weapons and aircraft. The Taliban next attack the pro-Iranian Wahdat militia, a Shi`ite group that has also been attacking Kabul. In March the Taliban capture its leader, Abdul Ali Mazari, who is killed within days under unclear circumstances. Taliban forces then attack Rabbani's troops, but this time the students are unable to hold positions directly threatening Kabul. Their image, moreover, is damaged when the rockets they fire on Kabul kill numerous civilians, but the attacks nevertheless continue.

== Early September ==
Taliban militias overrun the Herat area, where Ismail Khan, a close ally of Rabbani, had achieved a degree of normality; he escapes to Iran. Although the Pashtun population is a minority in the area, the new Taliban administration undertakes the Islamization of society amid tension and suspicion.

== September 6 ==
In Kabul an angry crowd storms the embassy of Pakistan as relations between Kabul and Islamabad degenerate.

== October ==
Taliban forces advance to the gates of Kabul for a second time, capturing Charasyab base and a band of hills.
