= Khaneqah, Afghanistan =

Khaneqah
- Location in Afghanistan
- Coordinates: 36°26′36″N 67°9′42″E
- Country: Afghanistan
- Province: Balkh Province
- Time zone: + 4.30

Khaneqah is a village in Balkh Province in northern Afghanistan.

It is located near the border with Turkmenistan.

== See also ==
- Balkh Province
