= Afghan Islamic Press =

Afghan news agency

- Native name: افغان اسلامي اژانس
- Industry: News media
- Founded: 1982
- Founder: Muhammad Yaqub Sharafat

Afghan Islamic Press (Pashto: افغان اسلامي اژانس - AIP) is an Afghan news agency established in 1982, during the Soviet Union's occupation of Afghanistan, by Muhammad Yaqub Sharafat. Sharafat was the nephew of Mohammad Yunus Khalis, one of the leaders of the anti-Soviet mujahideen guerrilla movement.

After the Taliban seized power in Afghanistan in 1996, some critics accused AIP of spreading propaganda on behalf of the movement. U.S. critics made such charges in particular during the 2001 U.S. invasion of Afghanistan in which U.S. air forces bombed Taliban targets, allowing the movement's Afghan enemies to overthrow it. During this phase of Afghanistan's war, the AIP reported extensively on civilian casualties in the U.S. air attacks, and was cited by international media and by anti-war writers such as University of New Hampshire economics professor Marc Herold.

AIP denies accusations of propaganda and says it has preserved its independence by refusing funding from governments, political groups or non-government organizations. It says it relies on three independent sources for verification of its stories.
