= Mary MacMakin =

American aid worker

- Born: 1929 or 1930 (age 95–96)
- Occupation: Aid worker
- Years active: 1961-present
- Known for: Founder of PARSA

Mary MacMakin (born 1929 or 1930) is an American aid worker who has worked predominantly in Afghanistan for women's rights since 1961. MacMakin founded PARSA, the organisation for Physiotherapy and Rehabilitation in Support of Afghanistan in 1998, and continued to work with it even after the Taliban deported her from the country.

== Career ==
Mary MacMakin's humanitarian career was inspired by the 1940 United States presidential campaign of Republican Wendell Willkie. She moved to Afghanistan in 1961, working as a humanitarian. Under the Taliban, this became work to promote the rights of women. MacMakin founded PARSA, the organisation for Physiotherapy and Rehabilitation in Support of Afghanistan, in 1998. This helped women work by setting them up in small cottage industries such as weaving silk scarves. In 2000, she was at first arrested by the Taliban, who then deported her after accusing her of spying and spreading anti-government propaganda. She was flown to Pakistan by the Red Cross. She was then set up in Peshawar, saying "As long as the Taliban are in control, I cannot go back."

MacMakin was profiled by Vogue magazine in 2001 following the American invasion during the War in Afghanistan. It was while being prepared for her photoshoot that upon discussion with her hair stylist, Terri Grauel, the idea for a Kabul-based beauty school called the Body and Soul Wellness Program. Anna Wintour donated $25,000 to help the programme open.

In 2006, she retired, handing control of PARSA to Marnie Gustavson.

== Personal life ==
MacMakin also speaks Dari (Persian); she became fluent in it during her residency in Afghanistan. Having spent the majority of her life in the country as a non-Muslim, she eventually converted to Islam in 2014 and received Afghan citizenship from President Ashraf Ghani in 2017.
