= 1994 in Afghanistan =

- Decades: 1970s; 1980s; 1990s; 2000s; 2010s
- See also: Other events of 1994; List of years in Afghanistan

The following lists events that happened during 1994 in Afghanistan.

Destructive and inconclusive fighting between forces loyal to Prime Minister Hekmatyar and troops loyal to President Rabbani results in the disintegration of central state authority and weaken the cohesion of the multinational state. Kabul remains divided into zones controlled by rival groups. A blockade of Kabul leads to fighting in northern Afghanistan over a tenuous road link to neighboring Tajikistan. The prolonged bombardment reduces most of the Afghan capital to ruins and causes 75% of Kabul's population of two million to flee the area. Outside Kabul the central government's authority all but disappears. Under the protection of Gen. Abdul Rashid Dostum, an Afghan Uzbek, Mazar-i-Sharif, the largest industrial complex in Afghanistan, enjoys relative stability. In Jalalabad local political groups and commanders cooperate to provide basic public services. In Kandahar local rivalries slow reconstruction. Herat is generally peaceful and secure and begins to reclaim its traditional role as commercial centre along trade routes with neighbouring Iran and Turkmenistan. International rivalries continue to agitate Afghanistan's divided society. The country's large Shi`ite minority and the 1.8 million Afghan refugees in neighbouring Iran automatically give Tehran a role in Afghan affairs. Saudi Arabia becomes involved by supporting factions it sees as a counterweight to Iranian influence. Pakistan's role is even more crucial. Not only does Pakistan give refuge to 1.5 million Afghan refugees, but it is permanent home to a section of the Pashtun ethnic group, which traditionally plays a leading role in Afghan politics. India and China view the strengthening of Islamic fundamentalism in Afghanistan as a danger to their own authority in Kashmir and Sinkiang, respectively, while other countries throughout the world are concerned about terrorists trained by Afghanistan's warring factions and the country's expanding drug trafficking. Serious international attention to Afghanistan remains distracted, however, both by the apparent unwillingness of Afghan leaders to cooperate and by attention to international crises elsewhere.

== Incumbents ==
- President: Burhanuddin Rabbani
- Prime Minister: Gulbuddin Hekmatyar (until 28 June), Arsala Rahmani Daulat (starting 28 June)
- Vice President: Mohammad Nabi Mohammadi (along with Mohammad Shah Fazli who died)

== Events ==
=== January ===
Hekmatyar's Hezb-i-Islami forces and those of Dostum coordinate an artillery and rocket assault on Kabul. The offensive represents a major realignment of forces vying for control of the government. Dostum precipitated the surrender of Kabul to resistance forces in April 1992 by withdrawing his support from the Soviet-installed regime of Najibullah. He placed the greater part of the communist army and air force under his command and assisted the new resistance government fighting Hekmatyar's forces.

=== March ===
UN Secretary-General Boutros Boutros-Ghali appoints former Tunisian foreign minister Mahmoud Mestiri head of a special peace commission. He meets leaders inside and outside Afghanistan, but no formal UN peace plan is announced.

=== June ===
Rabbani refuses to relinquish the presidency when his term expires, and the Supreme Court in Kabul extends his term for an additional six months. A similar extension to Hekmatyar's premiership is not granted. General dissatisfaction over the unending power struggle leads to renewed calls to convene a Loya Jirga, or grand assembly. While many Afghans fear that a Loya Jirga would serve to reinforce traditional social structures at the expense of social progress, there is movement nonetheless toward some form of assembly that could offer legitimate leadership.

=== July ===
Hamid al-Ghabid, secretary-general of the Organisation of the Islamic Conference, leads a peace effort, but individual OIC member states are unable to agree on an appropriate solution.

Representatives from throughout Afghanistan and prominent Afghans living abroad meet in Herat. Although the delegates endorse Rabbani's continuance as president, they initiate measures aimed at organizing a Loya Jirga to choose a new government.

=== August ===
A senior mullah from the southern city of Kandahar, Mohammad Omar, sets up the Taliban (Persian for "students") movement, which quickly becomes a powerful guerrilla force. The group's first accomplishment is the defeat of local commanders who have hijacked a truck convoy traveling from Pakistan to Central Asia. These mainly Pashtun students secure the release of the convoy and within days take control of Kandahar (October); later they extend their control to neighbouring provinces. While maintaining a low profile in a council in Kandahar, the Taliban declare that their goal is to disarm all factions and create a united, Islamic government in Afghanistan. The Taliban were recruited from schools set up among Afghan refugees in Pakistan during the years following the Soviet invasion of Afghanistan. From the time of the first Taliban successes, Pakistan denies any official support, but most observers discount such denials, noting the modern logistic support and sophisticated communications equipment at the disposal of the "students."

=== November ===
Arsala Rahmani is appointed acting prime minister.

== Births ==
- 31 March – Samira Asghari, member of the International Olympic Committee
