= Six plus Two Group on Afghanistan =

6+2 members Afghanistan

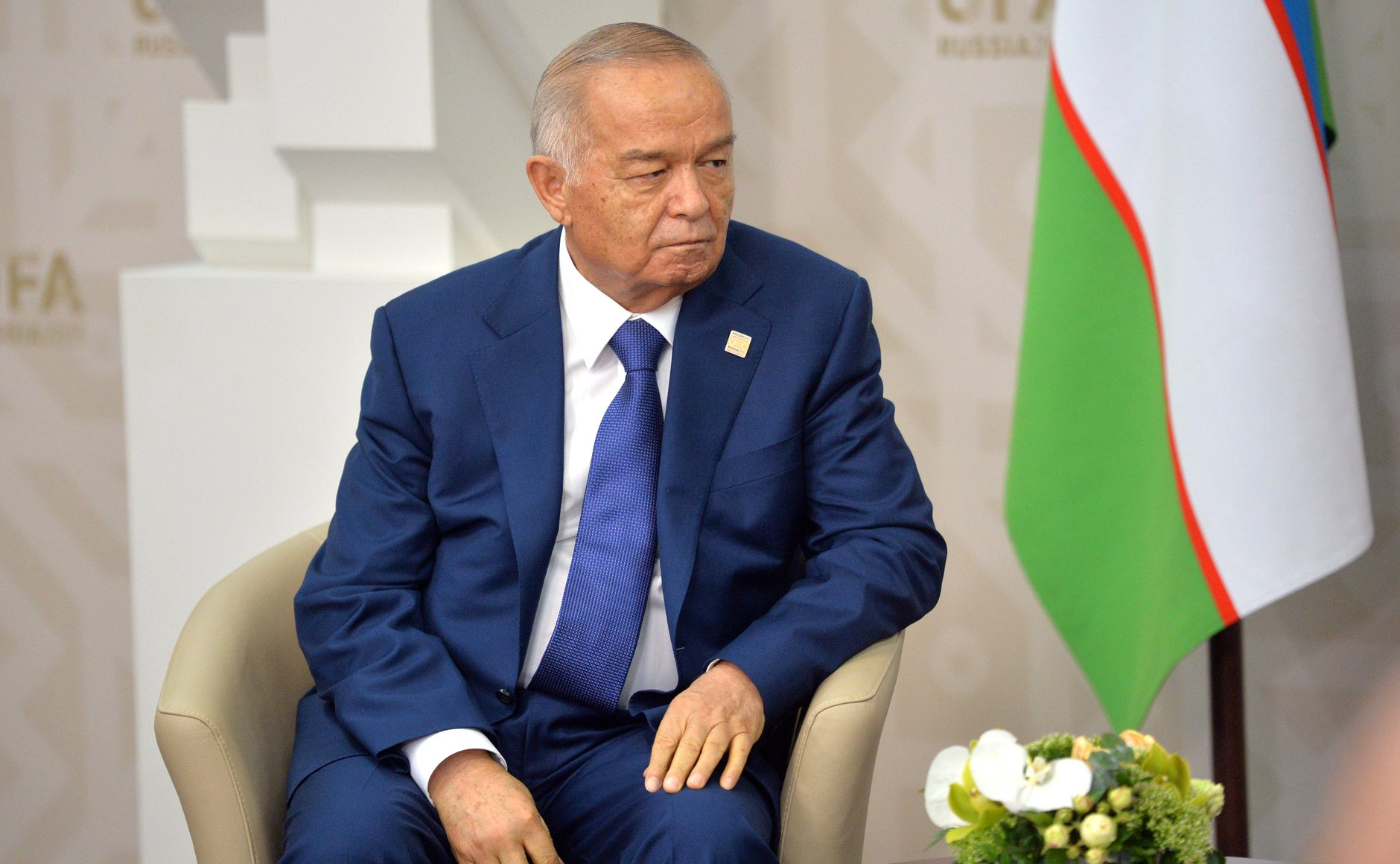
Uzbek President Islam Karimov, who initiated the coalition, seen here in 2015.

The Six plus Two Group on Afghanistan (also known as 6 plus 2 Contact Group or "6 plus 2") describes an informal coalition of the six nations bordering with Afghanistan (China, Iran, Pakistan, Tajikistan, Turkmenistan and Uzbekistan), plus the United States and Russia, which functioned from 1997 to 2001 under the aegis of the United Nations. The coalition worked to find a peaceful solution that would have included the participation of the Afghan Northern Alliance. Later it explored the issue of a post-Taliban government for Afghanistan.

== Countries involved ==
Target country

- Afghanistan

Neighbouring countries (6)

- China
- Iran
- Pakistan
- Tajikistan
- Turkmenistan
- Uzbekistan

plus 2

- United States
- Russia

== History ==
Following the Afghan Civil War, by 1996 the Taliban controlled most of Afghanistan, governing as the Islamic Emirate of Afghanistan. Fighting continued between the Taliban and the Northern Alliance, prompting international attention.

This diplomatic initiative was proposed by Islam Karimov, the President of the Republic of Uzbekistan, keeping in mind that the conflict in Afghanistan cannot be resolved by use of force and a peaceful political dialogue is needed. The idea was first discussed during meeting of Islam Karimov with UN Secretary-General's Special Envoy on Afghanistan Lakhdar Brahimi in August 1997. It was underlined that the peaceful settlement of the conflict would not be achieved without involvement of neighbouring states.

The objective of the Group was to find a solution to the Afghan problem, to assist in the establishment of a broadly representative and multi-ethnic Afghan government.

== Meetings under 6+2 initiative ==
Within the framework of the 6+2 initiative a number of important meetings and conferences were held in the UN Headquarters in New York, in the Uzbek capital Tashkent and other venues.

On 19 July 1999, the Group adopted the so-called Tashkent Declaration ("On Fundamental Principles for a Peaceful Settlement of the Conflict in Afghanistan"). In the declaration, the parties agreed not to provide military support to any Afghan party and to prevent the use of their territories for such purposes. Just a week following the adoption of the Declaration, the Taliban launched a military offensive, which was condemned in a UN Security Council statement.

On 8 February 2000 at United Nations Headquarters was held a High-level Meeting of "Six Plus Two" Group at the level of Permanent Representatives and above, which aimed at discussion of illicit production and distribution of drugs from Afghanistan. Participants exchanged views on the ways to address the drug-related issues of drug trafficking from Afghanistan through a comprehensive and balanced regional action plan.

On 18 September 2000, at the Second Meeting of the "Six plus Two" held at the foreign minister level, former United Nations Secretary-General Kofi Annan reiterated that "Six plus Two" Group remained essential forum for solution of Afghan question because it "enabled us to address the serious situation that had developed in Afghanistan and the surrounding region in the aftermath of the fall of Mazar-e-Sharif and the murder of Iranian diplomats".

In addition to other activities, the group also dealt with the issues of drug trafficking. Thus, on 13 September 2000 the Regional Action Plan was approved by representatives of the Governments of China, Iran, Pakistan, the Russian Federation, Tajikistan, the United States of America and Uzbekistan.

After the September 11 attacks, for a year and a half, the administration of President George W. Bush used the UN “6+2” framework on Afghanistan to establish a bilateral diplomatic channel with Iran involving regular meetings between U.S. and Iranian diplomats.

== Proposal for '6+3' format ==
Taking into account the situation in Afghanistan, Islam Karimov announced further development of this initiative during NATO Bucharest Summit in April 2008. Leader of Uzbekistan proposed transformation of "6 plus 2" into "6 plus 3", which foresees involvement of 6 neighbouring countries to Afghanistan plus the United States, Russia and NATO.

John C.K. Daly, fellow researcher of the Central Asia-Caucasus Institute at the Johns Hopkins University in Washington, in his recent article "Uzbek Afghanistan proposal relevant and timely - Afghanistan: Why "6 plus 3"?", published on 5 November 2009 noted the following:

The Tashkent meetings developed two key elements relevant today. For the first time since the 1979 Iranian revolution, Americans sat around the same table for indirect talks with Iran. Despite Iran's nuclear program and geopolitical ambitions, Iran's role in resolving Afghanistan's crisis and its potential role in establishing long-term peace there must not be ignored. Secondly, for the first time the Tashkent Declaration offered a constructive approach toward achieving reconciliation in Afghanistan through the participation of key indigenous opposing forces.
