= Comprehensive Disabled Afghans Programme =

United Nations agency

The Comprehensive Disabled Afghans Programme (CDAP) was a United Nations agency which was run by UNOPS CDAP worked to help disabled Afghans by establishing community rehabilitation centers, providing mobility devices, and special education for disabled children. From 1991 to 2004 they helped rehabilitate over 100,000 Afghan people injured by landmines. The program manager was Peter Colerdge.

In September 2004, following an external evaluation in 2003, the UNDP took over responsibility for the program, and redeveloped it as the National Program for Action on Disability (NPAD).

The Mine Action Program for Afghanistan estimated that 400,000 people were killed or injured by landmines in Afghanistan between 1990 and 2000. The CDAP reported that over half of the victims were men of working age, between the ages of 18 and 40.

Despite a reputation for being unfair to women, the Taliban administrators encouraged women to participate in the CDAP and even allowed them to work alongside men.
