= Shomali =

Shomali is a surname. Notable people with the surname include:

- Amer Shomali (born 1981), Palestinian artist
- Mohammad Ali Shomali (born 1965), Muslim academic
- Qustandi Shomali (born 1946), Palestinian historian
- Tima Shomali (born 1985), Jordanian showrunner and screenwriter
- William Hanna Shomali (born 1950), Palestinian Catholic prelate
