= MS Tampa =

MS Tampa may refer to the following ships:

- MS Tampa (1920), a diesel-powered ship in round-the-world cargo service for the American Pioneer Line; commissioned as USS Orvetta (IX-157) for the United States Navy during World War II
- MV Tampa, a Norwegian cargo ship built in 1984; involved in the Tampa affair in 2001
