= Waheedullah Sabawoon =

Wahidullah Sabawoon is a citizen of Afghanistan who has held a variety of political and military offices. He was one of the first and powerful commanders in resistance against Soviet occupation during 1979-1989. He has political, religious and cultural personality. According to the Asia Times he served as a leader under Gulbuddin Hekmatyar, the founder and leader of the Hezbi Islami Gulbuddin. However, he broke down his cooperation with Hekmatyar in 1996 and joined the Northern Alliance to resist the Taliban.

The report stated that he was arrested by police and NDS then controlled by shorae nizar (jamiat-e Islami) in late 2001, when he allegedly "called a meeting of about 150 "Islamic-minded" commanders in Kabul to determine the role of Islamic forces in the post-Taliban period." But it was a propaganda and a way for Massoud's successor General Qasim Fahim to subjugate Pashtun leaders with connection to old rivals Hezb-e Islami. After the assassination of the Northern Alliance leader Ahmad Shah Massoud, September 7, 2001 operated by Al-Qaida, instability and suspicion spread throughout the alliance, which affected hardest the pashtunes since they were associated with the Taliban. Later was cleared that his arrest was just an attempt for Shorae nizar to get rid of old rivals. Hamid Karzai later 2003 appointed Sabawoon to his cabinet and became his advisor in tribal and social affairs. Mr Sabawoon was the Northern Alliance's finance minister and for a short time, was defense minister during the mujahideen time.

On August 2, 2010, Mr Sabawoon was seriously wounded in an explosion targeting his motorcade in front of the Mian Omar High School in Jalalabad. He and five others were airlifted by a helicopter to hospital in Kabul for medical treatment. Later, he travelled to Turkey where he spent 55 days for further treatment. He said he had suffered deep wounds and was still unable to move without support (2010-10-07). The Taliban were taking responsibility for the attack.

In 2014 presidential election he made a huge campaign for presidential candidate Ashraf Ghani, who later became president of Afghanistan, and Mr Sabawoon became his presidential advisor.

Mr Sabawoon is also author of a series of books written in pashto and dari:

- Afghanistan and democracy
- National unity and leadership
- Parties tools for good politics
- Human rights
- Parties foundation of states
- A journey full of hardships and pride
