= Afghan Arabs =

Foreign mujahideen during the Soviet–Afghan War

Afghan Arabs (Arabic: أفغان عرب; Pashto: افغان عربان; Dari: عرب‌های افغان) were the Arab Muslims who immigrated to Afghanistan and joined the Afghan mujahideen during the Soviet–Afghan War. The term does not refer to the Central Asian Arabs of Afghanistan who are an ethnic Arab minority group living in the north western parts of the country. Despite being referred to as Afghans, they originated from the Arab world and did not hold Afghan citizenship.

It is estimated that between 8,000 and 35,000 Arabs immigrated to Afghanistan to partake in what much of the Muslim world was calling an Islamic holy war against the Soviet Union, which had militarily intervened in Afghanistan to support the ruling People's Democratic Party against the rebelling jihadists. The Saudi Arabian journalist Jamal Khashoggi, who was the first Arab journalist from a major Arabic-language media organization to cover the Soviet–Afghan War, approximated that there were 10,000 Arab volunteer fighters in Afghanistan during the conflict. Among many Muslims, the Afghan Arabs achieved near hero-status for their association with the defeat of the Soviet Union in 1989, and it was with this prestige that they were later able to exert considerable influence in mounting jihadist struggles in other countries, including their own. Their name notwithstanding, none of them were native Afghans, and some who were grouped with the community were not even Arabs. A number of the foreign jihadists in Afghanistan were Turkic or Malay, among other ethnicities, or non-Arabs from Arab countries, such as Kurds.

To the Western world, the most notorious Afghan Arab fighter was Osama bin Laden, who immigrated to Afghanistan from Saudi Arabia and founded al-Qaeda, which carried out the September 11 attacks against the United States in 2001, prompting the American invasion of Afghanistan a month later. Bin Laden then took refuge in Pakistan (with alleged Pakistani support) until May 2011, when he was killed by U.S. Navy SEAL Team Six, though the American-led war in Afghanistan against the Taliban continued until August 2021.

== History ==
=== Origin ===
Pakistani military officer Hamid Gul, who led the Inter-Services Intelligence (ISI) from 1987 to 1989, stated of his country's role in recruiting Muslim volunteer fighters in Afghanistan: "We are fighting a jihad and this is the first Islamic international brigade in the modern era. The Communists have their international brigades, the West has NATO, why can't the Muslims unite and form a common front?"

==== Role of Abdullah Yusuf Azzam ====
The Palestinian jihadist Abdullah Yusuf Azzam, who was assassinated in Pakistan in 1989, is often credited with creating enthusiasm for the Afghan mujahideen cause in Arab countries and throughout the broader Muslim world. Upon the Soviet intervention in Afghanistan in 1979, Azzam issued a fatwa (Defense of the Muslim Lands, the First Obligation after Faith) declaring that jihad against the Soviet Union was fard 'ayn (a personal obligation) for every able-bodied Muslim man: "Whoever can, from among the Arabs, fight jihad in Palestine, then he must start there. And, if he is not capable, then he must set out for Afghanistan." Although waging a jihadist struggle against Israel was regarded with the most importance in the Arab world, for practical reasons, "it is our opinion that we should begin [jihad] with Afghanistan before Palestine." The edict was supported by other prominent sheikhs, including the Grand Mufti of Saudi Arabia (the country's highest religious authority) Abd al-Aziz ibn Abd Allah Al Baz.

Sometime after 1980, Azzam established the Maktab al-Khidamat to organize guest houses in Peshawar, a Pakistani city near the Afghan border, as well as jihadist training camps in Afghanistan to prepare international recruits for confrontations with the Soviet Armed Forces. With financing from Saudi Arabia, including from Bin Laden, Maktab al-Khadamat paid for "air tickets and accommodation, dealt with paperwork with Pakistani authorities and provided other such services for the jihad fighters" who had come from all over the Muslim world. During the 1980s, Azzam had forged close links with two of the Afghan mujahideen's faction leaders: Gulbuddin Hekmatyar, who was favoured by the Pakistani government; and Abdulrab Rasul Sayyaf, who was receiving close support from Saudi Arabian authorities for the purpose of spreading Wahhabism (a stream of Islamic revivalism that originated in 18th-century Saudi Arabia) throughout Afghanistan.

Azzam toured not only the Muslim world, but also the United States in search of funding and young Muslim recruits. He inspired young Muslims with stories of miraculous deeds: mujahideen who defeated vast columns of Soviet troops virtually single-handed, who had been run over by tanks and survived, who were shot and still unscathed by bullets; while angels were said to ride into battle on horseback, and falling bombs were said to be intercepted by birds, which raced ahead of Soviet fighter jets to form a protective canopy over the Muslim warriors in Afghanistan.

Estimates of the number of Afghan Arab that came from around the world to fight in Afghanistan include 8,000, 10,000, 20,000 and 35,000.

In the camps of the foreign volunteers, Azzam was said to be "able to exercise a strong influence on the unpredictable jihadists". His slogan was "Jihad and the rifle alone: no negotiations, no conferences and no dialogues." He emphasized the importance of jihad: "those who believe that Islam can flourish [and] be victorious without jihad, fighting, and blood are deluded and have no understanding of the nature of this religion," and that Afghanistan was only the beginning:

This duty [i.e., jihad] shall not lapse with victory in Afghanistan, and the jihad will remain an individual obligation until all other lands which formerly were Muslim come back to us and Islam reigns within them once again. Before us lie Palestine, Bukhara, Lebanon, Chad, Eritrea, Somalia, the Philippines, Burma, South Yemen, Tashkent, Andalusia ...

Sometime after August 1988, Azzam was replaced by Bin Laden as the leader of the Arab Afghans in Peshawar. In November 1989, Azzam was assassinated by a roadside bomb in an attack that is variously suspected to have been organized by one of three (or four) actors: Israel's Mossad and the United States' Central Intelligence Agency, owing to his ties with Hamas during the First Intifada; the Egyptian Islamic Jihad, with whose leader Ayman al-Zawahiri he had an emerging rivalry; or Afghanistan's KhAD, possibly to cause infighting among the jihadist cause during the Soviet–Afghan War.

==== Later foreign volunteers ====
While there was generous financial aid to Afghan guerillas throughout the 1980s, most foreign Muslim fighters did not arrive in Afghanistan until the mid-1980s. By 1986, the Soviet Union had begun contemplating a military withdrawal from Afghanistan. As it became increasingly clear that the mujahideen's fight against the Soviet military was succeeding, it achieved more popularity with Muslims worldwide and thereby attracted more foreign volunteer fighters. Consequently, a significant amount of Arab jihadists arrived in Afghanistan when they were least needed; the late arrivals were reportedly twice the number of those who partook in the fighting against the Soviets at the height of the conflict.

Many of the later volunteers were different than the early "Afghan" Arab volunteers, who were inspired by Azzam, and have been criticized for being less serious:

Some Saudi tourists came to earn their jihad credentials. Their tour was organized so that they could step inside Afghanistan, get photographed discharging a gun, and promptly return home as a hero of jihad.

As the conflict continued, many Arab volunteers became sectarian and undisciplined in their violence, including in the Pakistani city of Peshawar, which served as the mujahideen's chief staging area and the centre of Afghan Arab activity.

These later expatriate volunteers included many sectarian Salafists and Wahhabists who alienated their hosts with their aloof manner and particular disdain for Sufism, which is held in high regard in Afghanistan and the Indian subcontinent. While the first Arab Afghans were "for the most part" welcomed by native Afghan mujahideen fighters, by the end of the conflict with the Soviets, there was a great deal of mutual antagonism between the two ethnic groups. The Afghan mujahideen resented "being told they were not good Muslims" and called the expatriate volunteers "Ikhwanis" or "Wahhabis" as a pejorative, and this resentment is thought by some (Marc Sageman) to have played a role in the relative ease with which the United States toppled the Islamic Emirate of Afghanistan.

===== Salafi influence =====
In the "great gathering" of international Islamists—Arabs, Afghans, and others—at camps and training centers around Peshawar, ideas were exchanged and "many unexpected ideological cross-fertilizations" took place, particularly a "variant of Islamist ideology based on armed struggle and extreme religious vigour" known as Salafi jihadism.

=== Globalization ===
==== After the Soviet withdrawal ====
The departure of the Soviets led to the start of the Afghan Civil War between Afghan Government forces and the so-called "Interim Afghan Government", Osama Bin Laden's Al Qaeda participated in the failed Battle of Jalalabad, Bin Laden personally led 800 Arabs to immobilize the 7th Sarandoy regiment but failed to do so leading to many casualties. At least 300 Arabs were killed by Afghan Forces during the Battle. The President of Afghanistan, Mohammad Najibullah was highly critical of Arab involvement in Afghanistan, claiming Wahabi Arabs would destroy Afghan values and culture and lead to an American invasion in the future. With the fall of the Soviet Union in 1991, the Najibullah Government lost its most important trading partner. The new Russian government under Boris Yeltsin cut exports to Najibullah's Government and in 1992 President Najibullah was removed from power by 4 of his Generals and the Homeland Party government in Kabul ceased to exist in April 1992. After this, some foreign mujahideen stayed in Afghanistan participating in the following Civil War caused by the power vacuum left behind from the dissolved Afghan Military. These Arab foreign fighters served as the essential core of the foot soldiers of Osama bin Laden's Al Qaeda, bin Laden being seen, according to journalist Lawrence Wright, as "the undisputed leader of the Arab Afghans" by fall of 1989.

Others returned "with their experience, ideology, and weapons," to their home (or other Muslim) countries, often proceeding to fight jihad against the government there. However minimal the impact of the "Afghan" Arabs on the war against the Soviets, the return of the volunteers to their home countries was often not. In Foreign Affairs Peter Bergen writes:

The foreign volunteers in Afghanistan saw the Soviet defeat as a victory for Islam against a superpower that had invaded a Muslim country. Estimates of the number of foreign fighters who fought in Afghanistan begin in the low thousands; some spent years in combat, while others came only for what amounted to a jihad vacation. The jihadists gained legitimacy and prestige from their triumph both within the militant community and among ordinary Muslims, as well as the confidence to carry their jihad to other countries where they believed Muslims required assistance. When veterans of the guerrilla campaign returned home with their experience, ideology, and weapons, they destabilized once-tranquil countries and inflamed already unstable ones.

==== Bosnia–Herzegovina ====
Three countries where Afghan Arabs had the biggest impact immediately following the war were Bosnia-Herzegovina, where they fought against Bosnian Serbs and Croats, Algeria and Egypt, where they fought the respective governments. According to Compass, 2,000 Egyptians and 2,800 Algerians were trained for combat in the Pakistan border area though not all of these volunteers saw action in Afghanistan. Several hundred had recently returned home by 1992.

In Bosnia the war ended with peace accords and American peacekeeping troops rather than sharia law. In both Algeria and Egypt after much blood letting the Islamist movement lost popular support and the government prevailed.

Bosnia was a major issue in the Muslim World which saw it as an aggression of Christians against Muslims and proof of Western double standards on human rights. About 4000 Jihadists from Peshawar and new international recruits went to fight in Bosnia, but their calls for Jihad and re-Islamization often fell on deaf ears among Bosnian Muslims which lacked a population explosion among the poor or a pious middle class that most Muslim countries had.

The Afghan Arab veterans formed a El-Mudzahidun regiment in August 1993 but hurt the Bosnian image internationally with "photographs of grinning Arab warriors brandishing the freshly severed heads of 'Christian Serbs'". The volunteers also took upon themselves Hisbah ("commanding right and forbidding wrong") and also attempted to impose the veil on women and the beard on men and in addition engaged in

causing disturbances in the ceremonies of [Sufi] brotherhoods they deemed to be deviant, ... smashing up cafes, and ... [organizing] sharia marriages to Bosnian girls that were not declared to the civil authorities.

After the 1995 Dayton Agreement (which gave Bosniaks control of 30% of the Bosnia and Herzegovina) were signed, all foreign volunteers were invited to leave the territory of Bosnia-Herzegovina and were replaced by NATO peacekeeping forces, a "bitter experience" for Afghan Arab jihadist-salafists. According to Gilles Kepel as of 2003, the only thing left of their presence are "a few naturalized Arab subjects married to Bosnian women."

==== Algeria ====
Several veterans of jihad in Afghanistan were important in the Armed Islamic Group of Algeria or GIA—one of two insurgent groups fighting the government in the Algerian Civil War after the army intervened to prevent the leading Islamist party from winning elections scheduled for January 1992. Sief Allah Djafar, aka Djafar al-Afghani, spent two years in Afghanistan and in 1993 became "amir" of the GIA. Providing doctrinal justifications for the GIA and a "steady stream of pro-GIA publicity" for Muslims outside Algeria (until June 1996 when GIA atrocities became too much) were two other Afghan veterans, Abu Mousab (a Spanish Syrian) and Abu Qatada (a Palestinian).

The GIA slogan—"no agreement, no truce, no dialogue"—echoed that of Abdullah Azzam. The group was committed to overthrowing the "impious" Algerian government and worked to prevent any compromise between them and the Islamist FIS party. Under Djafar, the GIA broadened its attacks to include civilians who refused to live by their prohibitions, and then foreigners living in Algeria. By the end of 1993 26 foreigners had been killed. In November 1993 it kidnapped and executed Sheik Mohamed Bouslimani "a popular figure who was prominent" in the moderate Islamist Algerian Hamas party who refused "to issue a fatwa endorsing the GIA's tactics." Djafar was killed February 26, 1994, but GIA continued to escalate violence, massacring whole villages of peasants for their alleged apostasy from Islam manifested by their failure to support GIA's jihad. Though the "undisputed principal Islamist force" in Algeria in 1994, by 1996, militants were deserting "in droves", alienated by its execution of civilians and Islamists leaders and believing it to be infiltrated by government agents. By the end of the 1990s the group was spent, somewhere between 40,000 and 200,000 lives had been lost, and the once broad and enthusiastic support by voters for the anti-government Islamism was replaced "with a deep fear of instability". Algeria was one of the few in the Arab world not to participate in the Arab Spring.

==== Egypt ====
In Egypt, "fundamentalists fighting the government in the 1990s included "several hundred 'Afghan' guerrillas". The main group was led by Ayman al-Zawahiri and Mohammed Shawky al-Istambouli—brother of the army lieutenant who led the assassination of Egyptian President Anwar Sadat in October 1981. Al-Istambouli established a base in Jalalabad, in eastern Afghanistan, during the war. (The Islamist terror group al-Gama'a al-Islamiyya still had about 200 men there in 1994.) A former army colonel and "prominent fundamentalist" who fled Egypt after the Sadat assassination, Ibrahim el-Mekkawi, maintained training camps and other bases near the Afghan-Pakistan border and directed the Islamic campaign in Egypt from Pakistan according to authorities in Cairo.

Egypt's institutions had more political strength and religious credibility than Algeria's, and hundreds rather than thousands were killed in the terror campaign before it was crushed in 1997–8. Al-Gama'a al-Islamiyya militants harassed and murdered members of the Coptic Christian minority, and by 1992 had broadened their targets to police and tourists, causing serious harm to Egypt's economy. Violence in Egypt reached its peak in the November 1997 Luxor massacre of 60 people most of whom were tourists.

==== Libya ====
In 2011, many Afghan Arabs, fought in the Libyan civil war (2011) against the Gaddafi government.

==== Taliban-controlled Afghanistan ====
In the mid- and late-1990s, the Afghan Arabs, in the form of the Wahhabi-oriented Al-Qaeda, became more influential in Afghanistan helping and influencing the Taliban. Several hundred Arab-Afghans participated in the 1997 and 1998 Taliban offensives in the north and helped the Taliban carry out the massacres of the Shia Hazaras there. Several hundred more Arab-Afghans, based in the Rishkor army garrison outside Kabul, fought on the Kabul front against General Ahmad Shah Massoud. At the same time the Taliban's ideology changed. Until the "Taliban's contact with the Arab-Afghans and their [the Taliban's] pan-Islamic ideology was non-existent."

By 1996 and 1998, al Qaeda felt comfortable enough in the sanctuary given them to issue a declaration of war against Americans and later a fatwa to kill Americans and their allies. "The Arab-Afghans had come full circle. From being mere appendages of the Afghan jihad and the Cold War in the 1980s they had taken centre stage for the Afghans, neighbouring countries and the west in the 1990s." This was followed by al Qaeda 1998 American embassy bombings in African countries and the September 11, 2001 attacks.

Following the attacks of September 11, 2001, America invaded Afghanistan, deposing the Taliban, ending the heyday of the Afghan Arabs. During the American campaign in Afghanistan in late 2001, many coherent units of Arab fighters were destroyed by JDAMs. Some Arab fighters have been held by Afghan tribesman for ransom paid by Americans.

== Characteristics ==
=== Contributions to the Afghan mujahideen ===
Perhaps the major contribution of the more serious Afghan Arab volunteers was humanitarian aid —- the setting up of hospitals around Peshawar and Quetta and providing funds for supply caravans to travel to the interior of the country. Abdullah Anas, himself one of the most famous of these Afghan-Arabs fighters, said that "90 percent were teachers, cooks, accountants, doctors [over the border in Pakistan]." The effectiveness of the Afghan Arabs in Afghanistan as a fighting force has been scoffed at, called a "curious sideshow to the real fighting," Estimates are there were about 2000 Arab Afghans fighting "at any one time", compared with about a 250,000 Afghan fighters and 125,000 Soviet troops.

Marc Sageman, a Foreign Service Officer who was based in Islamabad from 1987 to 1989, and worked closely with Afghanistan's Mujahideen, says

Contemporaneous accounts of the war do not even mention [the Afghan Arabs]. Many were not serious about the war. ... Very few were involved in actual fighting. For most of the war, they were scattered among the Afghan groups associated with the four Afghan fundamentalist parties.

One instance where the foreign volunteers did participate in the fighting is reported to have backfired disastrously, hurting the Afghan resistance by prolonging the war against the Afghan Marxist government following the Soviet withdrawal.

The March 1989 the Pakistani/American sponsored Battle for Jalalabad, was supposed to be the beginning of the end for the Afghan Communist government forces, the PDPA Government began negotiations with the "Interim Afghan Government". Unfortunately, radical non-Afghan salafists became involved, executing some 60 surrendering Communists, cutting their corpses into small pieces, and sending the remains back to the besieged city in a truck with the message that this would be the fate awaiting the infidels. Despite apologies and assurances of safety from Afghan resistance leaders, the Communists ended their negotiations of surrender, spurred them on to break the siege of Jalalabad launching over 400 Scud Ballistic Missiles at Mujahedeen(Interim Afghan Government) positions leading them to win the first major victory of the Civil War. The battle was an international embarrassment for the Pakistanis whom had supported the "Interim Afghan Government" causing the sacking of ISI head Hamid Gul In the words of Brigadier-General Mohammed Yousaf, an officer of the ISI, "the jihad never recovered from Jalalabad". Contrary to American and Pakistani expectations, this battle proved that the Afghan Army could fight without Soviet help, and greatly increased the confidence of government supporters. Conversely, the morale of the mujahideen involved in the attack slumped and many local commanders of Hekmatyar concluded truces with the government. Over 300 Arab foreign fighters were killed by Afghan Forces during the Battle.

=== Composition ===
According to one source, some "35,000 Muslim radicals from 43 Islamic countries in the Middle East, North and East Africa, Central Asia and the Far East," fought for the Afghan Mujahideen. Tens of thousand more foreign Muslim radicals came to study in the hundreds of new madrassas in Pakistan and along the Afghan border, that the Pakistan government funded. Eventually "more than 100,000 Muslim radicals were to have direct contact with Pakistan and Afghanistan and be influenced by the jihad."

The Mujahideen of Afghanistan were divided into several factions and the Afghan Arabs helped some factions much more than others. Factions led by Abdul Rasul Sayyaf and Gulbuddin Hekmatyar are described as having had good relations with Arab foreign fighters, Bin Laden would personally finance the 1990 Afghan Coup attempt by Hardline Communist Khalqists and Gulbuddin's Hezbi Islami. The faction led by Ahmad Shah Massoud, had good relations with Abdullah Azzam which is why Hekmatyar is one of the suspects for his demise alongside KhAD.

=== Pan-Islamism and martyrdom ===
Afghan Arabs have been described as strongly motivated by hopes for martyrdom. Rahimullah Yusufzai, the Peshawar bureau chief for the Pakistani daily News, remarked on his amazement that one camp of Arab Afghans pitched white tents on the front lines, where they were easy marks for Soviet bombers, then attacking the camp. When he asked the Arabs why, they replied: "We want them to bomb us! We want to die!" Bin Laden himself has said: "I wish I could raid and be slain, and then raid and be slain, and then raid and be slain."

=== Attitude towards the Western world ===
The Afghan resistance "had been considerably romanticized in the American press and had made tours through American churches, where they were lauded for their spiritual courage in the common fight against Marxism and godlessness". Some of the Afghan Arabs jihadis who flocked to Afghanistan, however, saw themselves as opponents of the West every bit as much as of Communism.

French writer Olivier Roy, who spent some years in Afghanistan, and served with the United Nations Office for Coordinating Relief in Afghanistan (UNOCA), has written that the jihadis "did not become anti-Western after 1991 – they had always been so."

All westerners, like me, who encountered the so-called "Arabs" inside Afghanistan during the war of resistance were struck (sometimes physically) by their hostility. The Arabs constantly asked the Afghan mujahideen commanders to get rid of the "infidels" and to choose only good Muslims as supporters, and called for the expulsion of Western NGOs ... in many areas the mujahideen had to intervene to prevent physical assaults on westerners.

Author Gilles Kepel writes that in Peshwar Pakistan, some Afghan Arabs attacked "Europe and American humanitarian agencies ... trying to help the Afghan refugees."

In contrast according to former British Defence Secretary Michael Portillo, late Prime Minister of Pakistan Benazir Bhutto told him said Osama bin Laden was initially pro-American. According to Prince Bandar bin Sultan of Saudi Arabia, on the one occasion he met and talked to Osama bin Laden, bin Laden thanked him for his "efforts to bring the Americans, our friends, to help us against the atheists, he said the communists." However, Robert Fisk reported that in 1996 bin Laden considered Saudi Arabia to be a colony of the U.S., that the Saudi people regarded the U.S. as the "real enemy," and that the deaths of 600,000 Iraqi children due to UN sanctions amounted to a "crusade against Islam."

==== Connections with the Central Intelligence Agency ====
Seal of the CIA

Robin Cook, former leader of the British House of Commons and Foreign Secretary from 1997 to 2001, wrote in The Guardian on Friday, July 8, 2005,

Bin Laden was, though, a product of a monumental miscalculation by western security agencies. Throughout the 80s he was armed by the CIA and funded by the Saudis to wage jihad against the Russian occupation of Afghanistan. Al-Qaida, literally "the database", was originally the computer file of the thousands of mujahideen who were recruited and trained with help from the CIA to defeat the Russians.

However the notion that the CIA had any contact with non-Afghan mujahideen and specifically bin Laden is disputed by a number of sources. According to Peter Bergen of CNN the story

that the CIA funded bin Laden or trained bin Laden—is simply a folk myth. There's no evidence of this. In fact, there are very few things that bin Laden, Ayman al-Zawahiri and the U.S. government agree on. They all agree that they didn't have a relationship in the 1980s. And they wouldn't have needed to. Bin Laden had his own money, he was anti-American and he was operating secretly and independently.

The real story here is the CIA didn't really have a clue about who this guy was until 1996 when they set up a unit to really start tracking him.

Bergen quotes Pakistani Brigadier Mohammad Yousaf, who ran ISI's Afghan operation between 1983 and 1987:

It was always galling to the Americans, and I can understand their point of view, that although they paid the piper they could not call the tune. The CIA supported the mujahideen by spending the taxpayers' money, billions of dollars of it over the years, on buying arms, ammunition, and equipment. It was their secret arms procurement branch that was kept busy. It was, however, a cardinal rule of Pakistan's policy that no Americans ever become involved with the distribution of funds or arms once they arrived in the country. No Americans ever trained or had direct contact with the mujahideen, and no American official ever went inside Afghanistan.

According to Peter Beinart,

Vincent Cannistraro, who led the Reagan administration's Afghan Working Group from 1985 to 1987, puts it, "The CIA was very reluctant to be involved at all. They thought it would end up with them being blamed, like in Guatemala." So the Agency tried to avoid direct involvement in the war, ... the skittish CIA, Cannistraro estimates, had less than ten operatives acting as America's eyes and ears in the region. Milton Bearden, the Agency's chief field operative in the war effort, has insisted that "[T]he CIA had nothing to do with" bin Laden. Cannistraro says that when he coordinated Afghan policy from Washington, he never once heard bin Laden's name.

According to Olivier Roy, "the CIA was not in charge (accusing Bin Laden of having been a CIA agent is nonsense) of the program" to enlist Muslim volunteers to fight Soviets in Afghanistan, "but it did not oppose the scheme or worry about it negative consequences."

The US attitude had more to do with benign neglect than Machiavellian strategy. Eagerness to claim absolute victory in Afghanistan, bureaucratic inertia, lack of concern and expertise, overconfidence in the Saudi and Pakistani security services ... all explain why nobody in Washington cared.

However, Sheik Omar Abdel Rahman—a major recruiter of the Afghan Arabs—was given his visas to enter the US on four separate occasions by the CIA. Egyptian officials testified that the CIA actively assisted him. Rahman was a co-plotter of the 1993 World Trade Center bombing.

== See also ==
Afghan conflict:

- 055 Brigade
- Reagan Doctrine
  - CIA activities in Afghanistan
- Operation Cyclone
  - Allegations of CIA assistance to Osama Bin Laden
  - Allegations of Pakistani support for Osama Bin Laden

Chechen–Russian conflict:

- Islamic International Brigade
- Arab Mujahideen in Chechnya

Yugoslav Wars:

- Bosnian mujahideen

Iraqi conflict:

- Kurdish mujahideen
