= First Battle of Jalalabad Airport =

- Part of Afghan Civil War (1989–1992), Battle of Jalalabad (1989) and Afghanistan–Pakistan skirmishes
Date	6–8 March
Location	Jalalabad Airport, Republic of Afghanistan 34°24′01″N 70°29′54″E
Result	Initial Mujahideen victory: Mujahideen briefly capture Jalalabad Airport; Second Battle of Jalalabad Airport begins on March 9; Continuation of the Battle of Jalalabad

Belligerents
Republic Of Afghanistan	Afghan Interim Government: Hezb-e Islami Gulbuddin (primarily)

Commanders and leaders
(Afghanistan) Mohammad Najibullah (Afghanistan) Shahnawaz Tanai (Afghanistan) General Barakzai X	Gulbuddin Hekmatyar (Pakistan) Hamid Gul

Units involved
Afghan Army: 9th Infantry Division; 10th Engineer-Sapper Regiment; 11th Infantry Division; Ministry of Interior: 7th Operative Regiment (Sarandoy); 8th Border Guard Brigade; Afghan National Guard: Unknown tank battalion; Afghan Air Force Revolution Defense Groups	Interim Afghan Government: 5 Detachments; Pakistan: Pakistani Volunteers

Strength
Afghanistan: Unknown	Hezb-I-Islami Gulbuddin: 3,300; 11 T-54Ms; 3 BMPs; 2 BTR-60PB; 2 BRDM-2; 55 mortars; 12 howitzers; 79 rocket launchers; Pakistan: Unknown

Casualties and losses
Republic Of Afghanistan: 71 killed; 122 wounded; 2 airport employees killed; 1 Antonov An-26 transport plane destroyed	Afghan Government in Exile: Unknown; Pakistan: Unknown

The First Battle of Jalalabad Airport was a battle between fighters associated with the Afghan Interim Government and Afghan Armed Forces that took place at Jalalabad Airport on 6–8 March 1989. It was part of the Battle of Jalalabad and the greater Afghan Civil War that began after the Soviet withdrawal from Afghanistan in February 1989. A second battle broke out at the airport on 9 March 1989, where the airport was recaptured by the government.

== Background ==
In February 1989, the Soviet Union withdrew its forces from the Republic of Afghanistan as part of the Geneva Accords. In March 1989, the Afghan Interim Government launched an attack on the Eastern city of Jalalabad with the support of the Pakistani Inter-Service Intelligence. The Americans were reportedly motivated by their wish to humiliate the Marxists and send them out of Afghanistan, "clinging to their helicopters", thus avenge the fall of South Vietnam; Pakistan wished to establish a friendly government in Kabul led by the Peshawar Seven.

== See also ==
- Battle of Jalalabad (1989)
- Afghan Civil War (1989–1992)
- Armed Forces of the Democratic Republic of Afghanistan
