= Afghan Civil War (1989–1992) =

Civil war in Afghanistan (1989–1992)

First Afghan Civil War
- Part of the Cold War, Revolutions of 1989, Dissolution of the Soviet Union, and Afghan conflict
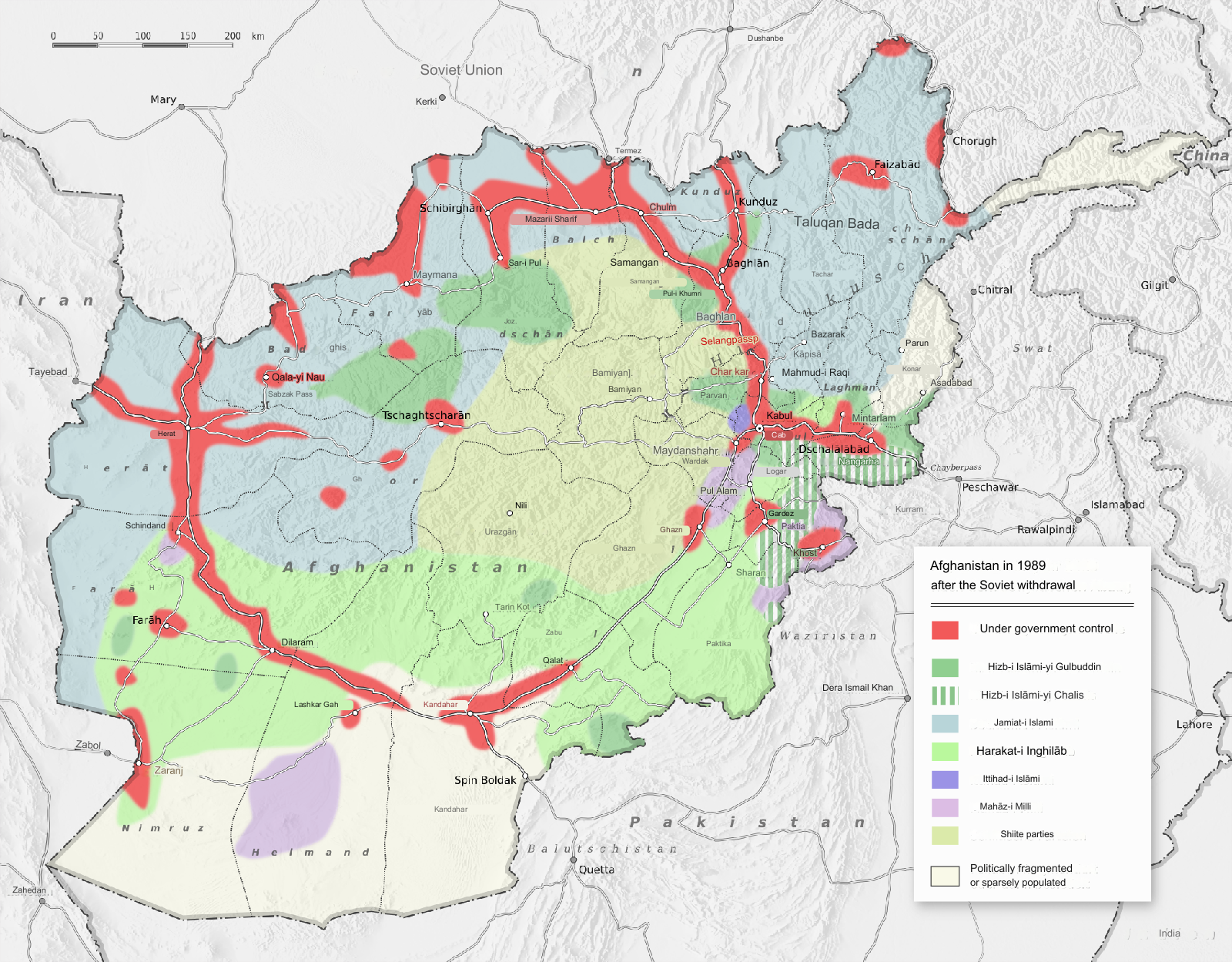
- Political situation in Afghanistan in 1989, following the Soviet withdrawal
Date	15 February 1989 – 27 April 1992 (3 years, 2 months, 1 week and 5 days)
Location	Afghanistan (with some spillover into Pakistan)
Result	Afghan Interim Government victory; Dissolution of the Homeland Party Government; The Peshawar Accord leads to the creation of the Islamic State of Afghanistan on 28 April 1992; Continued civil war among Mujahideen forces

Belligerents
Afghanistan	Afghan Interim Government In Exile; Jamiat-e Islami; Hezb-e Islami Gulbuddin (until July 1989); National Islamic Front of Afghanistan; Ittehad-e Islami; Hezb-i Islami Khalis; Harakat-i Inqilab-i Islami; Independent Factions: Hezbe Wahdat; Khalq (1990); Hezb-e Islami Gulbuddin (from July 1989) (Afghanistan) Junbish-i Milli (from 1992); Various factions also fought among each other; Foreign Fighters; Al Qaeda; Maktab al-Khidamat; Pakistan; Saudi Arabia; Turkey; United States; United Kingdom; China; Germany; Iran

Commanders and leaders
(Afghanistan) Mohammad Najibullah; Shahnawaz Tanai (until 1990) (attempted coup, fled Afghanistan); Nazar Mohammed (attempted coup, fled Afghanistan); (Afghanistan) Abdul Rashid Dostum (until 1991) (AWOL); (Afghanistan) Mohammad Aslam Watanjar; (Afghanistan) Mohammad Nabi Azimi; (Afghanistan) Nur ul-Haq Ulumi; (Afghanistan) Abdul Jabar Qahraman; (Afghanistan) General Barakzai †; (Afghanistan) Khushal Peroz; (Afghanistan) Ismatullah Muslim; (Afghanistan) Fazal Haq Khaliqyar	Ahmad Shah Massoud; Burhanuddin Rabbani; Ahmad Zia Massoud; Din Mohammad Jurat; Atta Muhammad Nur; Abdullah Abdullah; Naqib Alikozai; Mohammed Fahim; Ismail Khan; Bibi Ayesha; Saleh Registani; Gulbuddin Hekmatyar; Fazal Haq Mujahid; Hamid Gul; Abdullah Azzam †; Osama bin Laden (WIA); Ayman al-Zawahiri; Ibn Al-Khattab; Mulavi Younas Khalis; Amin Wardak; Abdul Haq; Haji Abdul Qadeer; Jalaluddin Haqqani; Abdul Rasul Sayyaf; Mohammad Nabi; Sibghatullah Mojaddedi; Ahmed Gailani; Abdul Rahim Wardak; Muhammad Asif Muhsini; Abdul Ali Mazari; Shahnawaz Tanai (from 1990); (Afghanistan) Abdul Rashid Dostum (from 1992)

Strength
Afghan Army: 150,000 (1990); Afghan Air Force: 20,000 (1989); National Guard: Presidential Guard: 10,000 (1989); All forces under Afghan control: Around 515,000 (1990), including paramilitary Sarandoy, and WAD; Militia forces: up to 170,000 (1991)	Mujahadeen: Unknown; Pakistan: 5,000

Casualties and losses
- 14,864 killed (per UCDP)

The Afghan Civil War of 1989–1992 (Pashto: له ۱۹۸۹ څخه تر ۱۹۹۲ پوري د افغانستان کورنۍ جګړه), also known as the First Afghan Civil War, took place between the Soviet withdrawal from Afghanistan on 15 February 1989 which ended the Soviet–Afghan War, and 27 April 1992, the day after the proclamation of the Peshawar Accords proclaiming a new interim Afghan government which was supposed to start serving on 28 April 1992.

Mujahideen groups, some of them ostensibly united as part of the Afghan Interim Government proclaimed as their conviction that they were battling the hostile "puppet regime" of the Republic of Afghanistan in Kabul. In March 1989, the interim government and the Pakistani Inter-Services Intelligence (ISI) attacked the city of Jalalabad and were pushed back three months later in what is known as the Battle of Jalalabad. Hekmatyar's Hezbi Islami pulled their support for the interim government following the defeat.

In March 1991 after a gruelling eleven-year siege, a mujahideen coalition managed to capture the regime's stronghold of Khost. In March 1992, having lost the last remnants of Soviet support, President Mohammad Najibullah began purging the ethnic Tajik and Uzbek militia commanders in Northern Afghanistan and replacing them with Pashtun Army generals, while simultaneously negotiating with the Pashtun elements of the mujahideen including Gulbuddin Hekmatyar's Hezbi Islami. This led to mass defections by Northern militias who allied with Massoud against Najibullah and began an offensive from the north that would topple his government. Hezb-e Islami Gulbuddin refused to take part in or discuss a coalition government under the Pakistani-sponsored Peshawar Peace Accords and invaded Kabul with the help of Khalqist generals and other former officials of Najibullah's regime. This triggered a civil war starting on 25 April 1992, initially between three mujahideen groups before growing to five or six within weeks.

== Background (1978–1989) ==
In October 1978, opponents of the reforms of the People's Democratic Party of Afghanistan (PDPA) government, including modernizing traditional Islamic civil and marriage laws, changing the national flag to a Soviet-style red flag, and forcing land reform, started a revolt, and called themselves mujahideen.

In spite of a UN General Assembly resolution condemning the 1979 USSR invasion and the Organisation of Islamic Cooperation demanding immediate Soviet withdrawal, the Russians fought until early 1989 in the Soviet–Afghan War. They managed to take control of major cities and strategic installations, thus acerbating nationalistic feelings among rebels who drew Soviet troops into war with urban uprisings and tribal armies. The Soviets leveled villages, destroyed irrigation ditches and laid millions of mines in an attempt to root out the mujahideen rebels. In those nine years, between 500,000 and 2 million Afghans were killed and millions were displaced, and in large numbers fled into neighboring countries. The new Soviet leader Mikhail Gorbachev, taking charge in 1985, in 1987 announced his intention to withdraw from Afghanistan, which took place between May 1988 and February 1989.

The mujahideen resistance movement had started chaotically in 1978 and had always stayed highly segmented along regional, ethnic, tribal and religious lines: after four years the mujahideen operated from an estimated 4,000 bases, a typical commander leading a few hundred men. In 1985, seven larger Sunni Islamic rebel groups had coordinated their fight against the Soviets, who were also known as the Pakistani backed Islamic Unity of Afghanistan Mujahideen. After the Soviets had left Afghanistan in February 1989, some smaller groups put down arms or joined the government however the larger mujahideen groups continued their fight against the PDPA-government of President Mohammad Najibullah, who was still massively supported by the Soviet Union, and establish a Islamist government. Many of these larger Mujahideen groups such as Jamiat-e Islami (or Jamiat) had existed years before the PDPA seized power. Leaders such as Ahmad Shah Massoud and Jalaluddin Haqqani attempted uprisings (with Pakistani support) in 1974 against the government of Daoud Khan. These uprisings failed and many of these groups fled to Pakistan to be trained by the Pakistan intelligence service, ISI, in a future insurgency against the Daoud Khan government, which would be overthrown by PDPA military officers only 4 years later.

=== Attacks between mujahideen groups (1987–1989) ===
According to published reports during the 1980s, Gulbuddin Hekmatyar's Hezb-e Islami Gulbuddin developed a reputation for attacking other resistance forces, especially those of Massoud, and raiding or blocking their food and arms supplies as well as caravans of relief organizations. According to author Steve Coll, Hekmatyar attacked Ahmad Shah Massoud so often that Washington (who was supporting him through Pakistan) "feared he might be a secret KGB plant whose mission was to sow disruption within the anti-communist resistance." Reports suggest that Hekmatyar's commanders were saving their men and weapons to establish Hezb-e Islami Gulbuddin as the dominant organization once the Soviets departed.

In 1989, Hekmatyar's forces once again conducted an attack on Massoud's forces, this time targeting Massoud and the senior leadership of Shura-e Nazar, Massoud's military and political alliance of 130 northern commanders. While they were not able to kill or injure Massoud, Hekmatyar's forces tortured to death thirty of his men, some of whom were his close friends. Survivors describe the torture as pulling their eyes out, cutting their ears and noses off, and cutting their stomachs open. Massoud consequently ordered an operation to hunt down the murderers. Shura-e Nazar were able to capture them, but instead of performing revenge killings, Massoud sent them to Peshawar to have them tried before a court. The courts sentenced them to death. For the sake of Afghan unity, Massoud declared: "My message to Hekmatyar's people is that without a united front we cannot succeed, we cannot achieve anything in Afghanistan." Roy Gutman of the United States Institute of Peace considered Massoud "the only Afghan leader with an integrated vision".

Through this period (1987–89) both Massoud and Hekmatyar had been frequently fighting each other and killing each other's officers, and Massoud's rhetoric was rarely matched by action. In 1988, for instance, Massoud's forces attacked Hekmatyar loyalists in Badakhshan Province. In 1989, Massoud arrested and executed one of Hekmatyar's local officers, Jamal Agha, whom he accused of having murdered a number of Jamiat commandants: Mohammad Izzatullah, Mohammad Islamuddin, Mulla Abdul-Wadoud, and Payinda Mohammad.

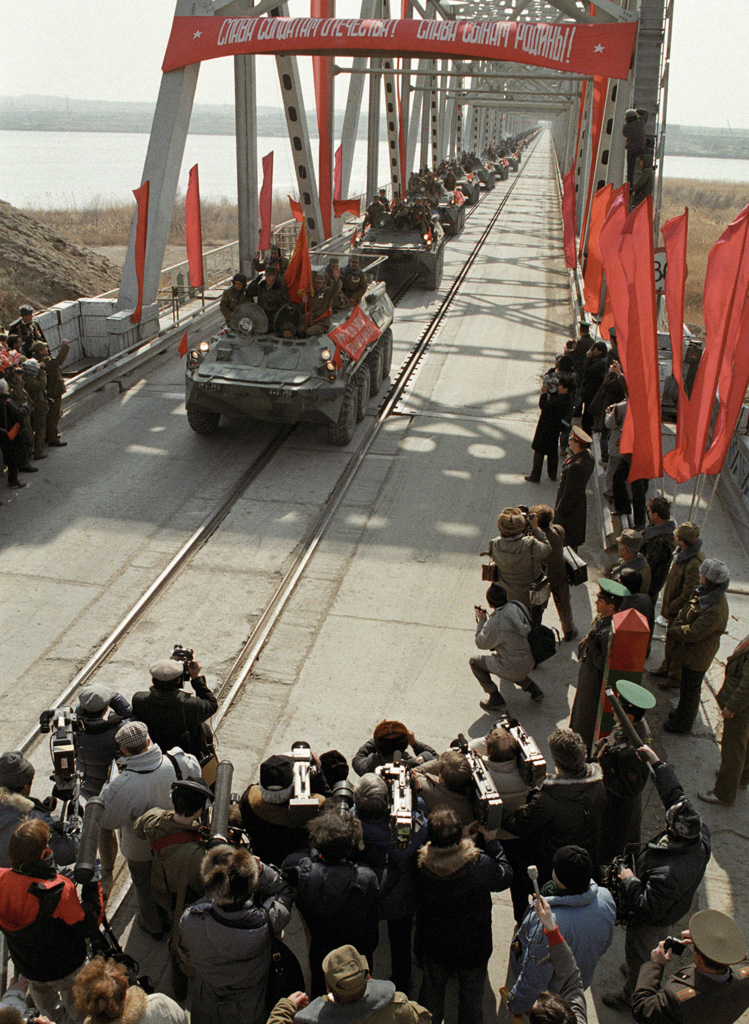
The final Soviet troops to withdraw from Afghanistan in 1989

However, Hekmatyar's supporters accused Massoud of having killed these commandants to centralize his authority in Jamiat's ranks and framed Agha, whom they claimed had good relations with the victims. This was stated by Hezb-e Islami Gulbuddin supporter Mohammad Tanwir Halim in 2013. However, this version of the story is uncorroborated and Hekmatyar was widely unpopular in any case for his vicious murders, though this was not necessarily true of his commanders some of whom like Abdul-Rauf Safi, Abdul-Sabour Farid and perhaps Agha enjoyed decent relations with other groups. Massoud later appointed Safi as Kabul commandant. Hekmatyar's supporters also accused Massoud of betrayal because of his ceasefires with Soviet forces and in this they had the support of Jamaat leader Mohammad Eshaq who also criticized Massoud for his ceasefire with the Soviets during the second half of the occupation. It appears that Massoud was trying to form a base independent of Pakistan, and in this endeavour, he did make deals with governments traditionally hostile to the mujahideen, including India and the Soviets. However, the Soviet forces, at the request of Najibullah, attacked Massoud's forces before withdrawing during Operation Typhoon, killing over 600 members of Jamiat.

The accusations of betrayal by both sides are disputed. The Pakistani coordinator, Mohammed Yousaf, does not challenge Massoud's version of Agha's story, despite Pakistan's hostility towards Massoud. Similarly, Palestinian mujahideen leader Abdullah Azzam claimed that Massoud was a legendary fighter, though Azzam notably rarely criticized any mujahideen leaders to avoid friction.

== Main participants ==
=== Republic of Afghanistan ===
Afghanistan's flag between 1987 and 1992

==== PDPA/Homeland Party government ====
After the Soviet withdrawal on 15 February 1989, Najibullah's government and the PDPA were on their own. The U.S. intelligence agencies expected the regime to collapse within three to six months. However, this estimation did not take into account several assets available to the Republic of Afghanistan government. The first of these was the large quantities of military hardware donated by the Soviet Union. In 1989, the army and pro-government militias and paramilitaries still had 1,568 tanks, 828 armoured personnel carriers, 4,880 artillery pieces, 126 modern fighter-bombers and 14 attack helicopters. Also, the DRA continued to receive massive Soviet aid, valued between two and six billion dollars a year, and Soviet military advisors were still present in Afghanistan. The government forces also came to rely on the use of large quantities of Scud missiles: between 1988 and 1992 more than 2,000 of these were fired by the 99th Missile Brigade of the Afghan Armed Forces. It was the largest amount of ballistic missiles used since World War II. This considerable amount of firepower was sufficient to keep the mujahideen at bay. The Republic heavily relied on keeping the Salang Pass open to supply its troops.

==== 99th Missile Brigade ====
The 99th Missile Brigade was responsible for Kabul's Scud Missile arsenal; the Brigade consisted of Afghans as well as five Soviet volunteers. The Brigade launched around 2,000 missiles between 1989 and 1992. The brigade was founded in the 1980s during the Soviet–Afghan War, with resources to the brigade increasing drastically following the Soviet withdrawal. Members of the 99th participated in the Battle of Jalalabad, the Siege of Khost as well as a few retaliatory strikes against Pakistan for violating the Afghan airspace.

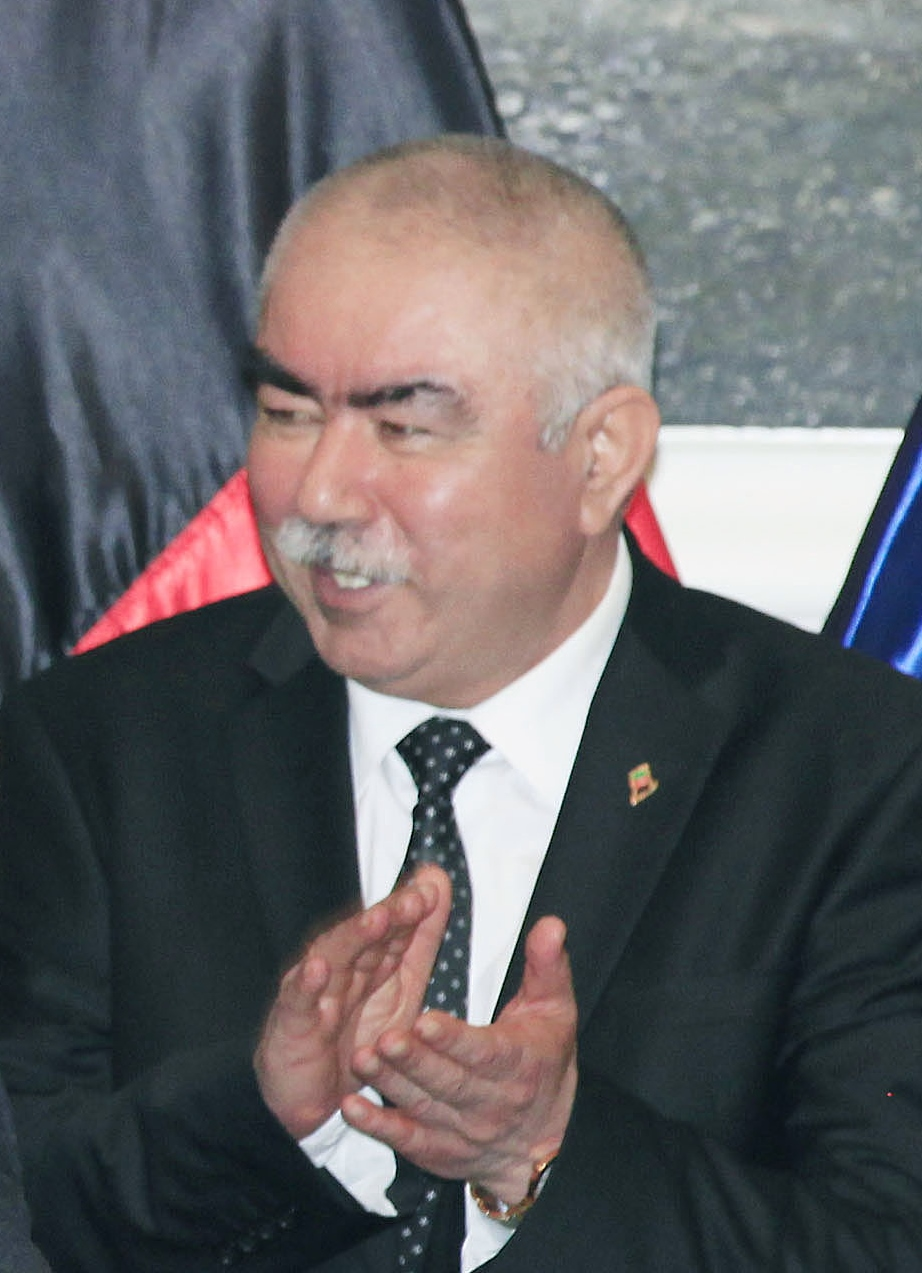
Abdul Rashid Dostum

==== Abdul Rashid Dostum (Jowzjani militia) ====
Abdul Rashid Dostum's Jowzjani militia, officially called the 53rd Infantry Division, was the most effective pro-government militia. Numbering 40,000 men drawn from the Uzbek minority, it took its orders directly from Najibullah, who used it as a strategic reserve force and paramilitary. After 1989, this force was the only one capable of carrying out offensive operations.

=== Mujahideen ===
==== Ahmad Shah Massoud (Jamiat-e Islami) ====
The U.S. provided Massoud with little to no support. He instead got support from the United Kingdom, specifically MI6 and the Special Air Service. Part of the reason why he still got only minor support was that the U.S. permitted its funding and arms distribution to be administered by Pakistan which favored Hekmatyar, who considered himself Massoud's arch-enemy. Massoud was also seen as "too independent". The Pakistanis did however grant a base of operations in Pakistan and assisted Jamiat forces militarily during the Badaber Uprising. Primary advocates for still supporting Massoud instead were the U.S. State Department's Edmund McWilliams, and the U.S. Special Envoy to Afghanistan, Peter Tomsen, who were on the ground in Afghanistan and Pakistan. Others included two Heritage Foundation neoconservative foreign policy analysts, Michael Johns and James A. Phillips, both of whom championed Massoud as the Afghan resistance leader most worthy of U.S. support under the Reagan Doctrine.

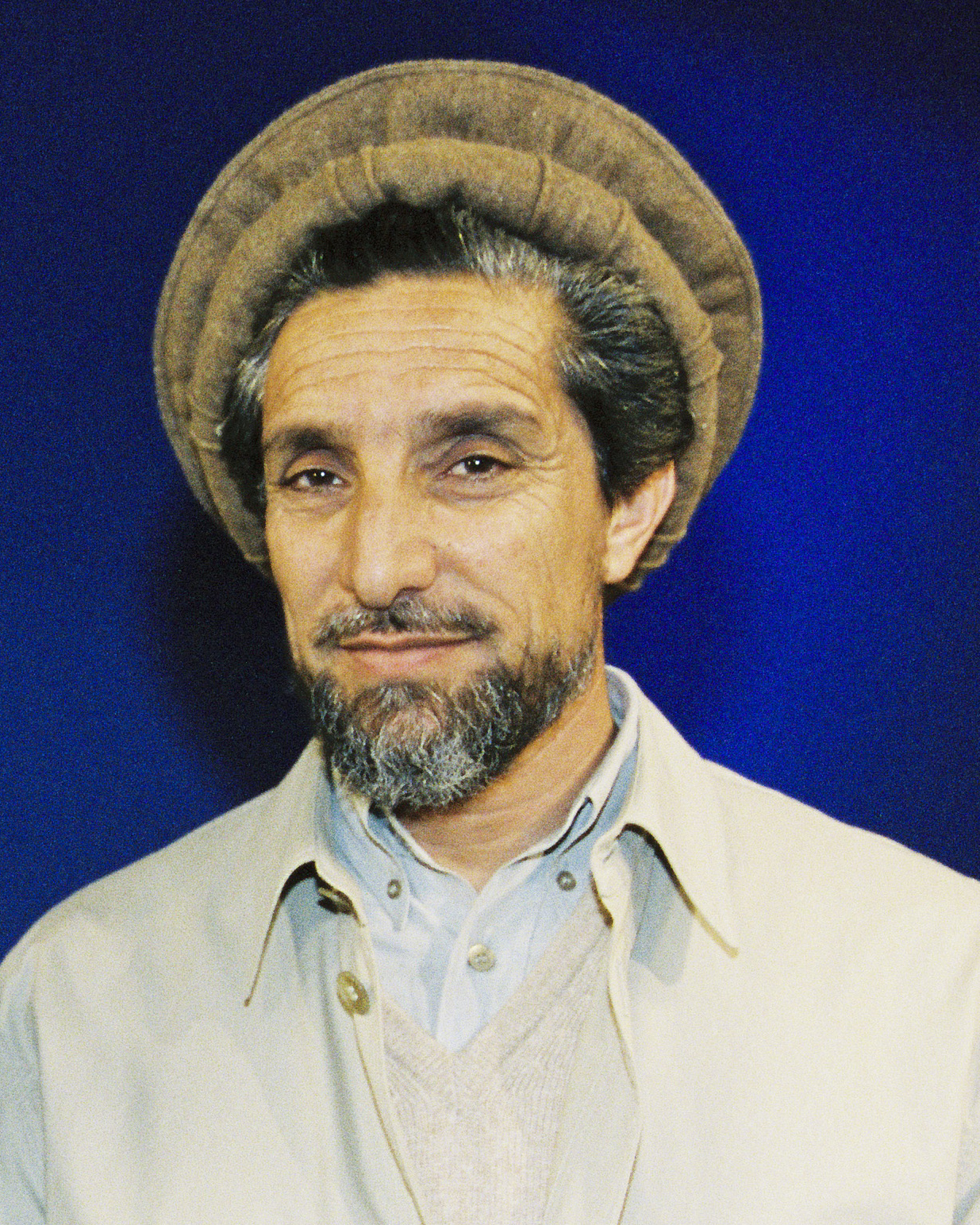
Ahmad Shah Massoud

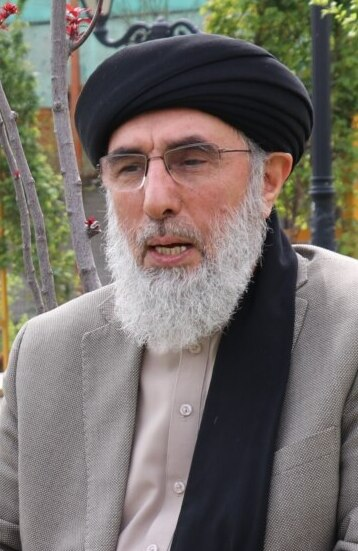
Gulbuddin Hekmatyar

==== Gulbuddin Hekmatyar (Hezb-e Islami Gulbuddin) ====
During the Soviet-Afghan War, the U.S. had allowed Pakistan to funnel much American military aid to Hezb-e Islami Gulbuddin. The U.S. permitted its funding and arms distribution to be administered by Pakistan, which favored Hekmatyar.

According to Tomsen, Hekmatyar was hired in 1990 by the ISI to conquer and rule Afghanistan in the benefit of Pakistani interests, a plan which was delayed until 1992 as a result of U.S. pressure to cancel it.

==== Abdul Rasul Sayyaf (Ittehad-e Islami) ====
One of the beneficiaries of Saudi Arabian support, especially financial, was Abdul Rasul Sayyaf and his army Islamic Union for the Liberation of Afghanistan (Ittehad-e Islami).

==== Jalaluddin Haqqani (Haqqani network) ====
Another beneficiary of Saudi support was Jalaluddin Haqqani, who had had strong contacts to Arab fighters in the Soviet–Afghan War.

== Battle of Jalalabad ==
=== Prelude ===
In the spring of 1989, the Islamic Unity of Afghanistan Mujahideen, supported by the Pakistani intelligence agency ISI, attacked Jalalabad. The ISI's Director Gul wanted to see a mujahideen government over Afghanistan, led by Hekmatyar.

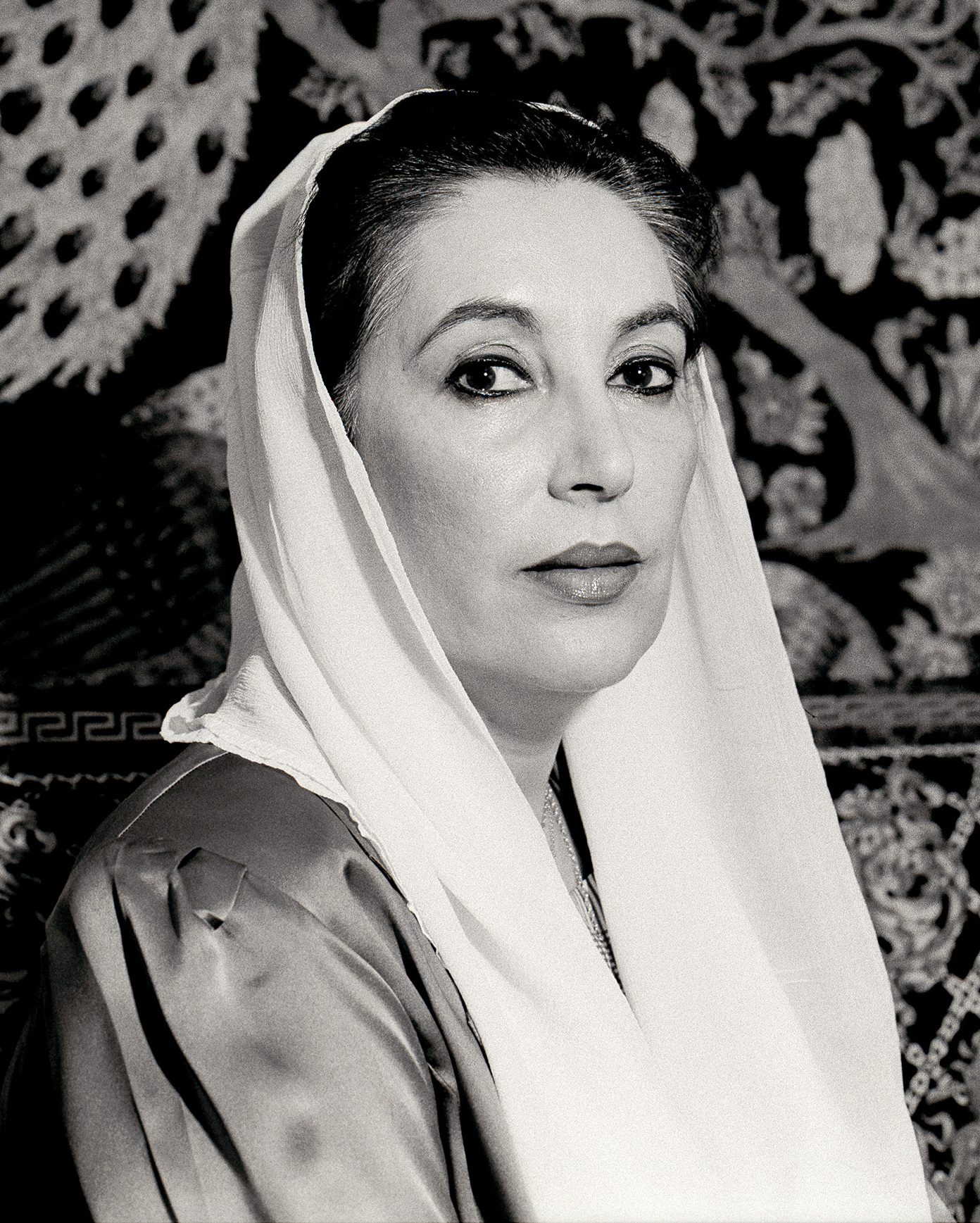
Benazir Bhutto

Analysts disagree as to whether Pakistan's Prime Minister Benazir Bhutto was totally kept in the dark about the ISI's plan to overthrow the Afghan government or was one of the instigators of this attack. One analyst stated that also U.S. Ambassador to Pakistan Robert B. Oakley was exhortating this mujahideen attack. The Americans reportedly were motivated by their wish to humiliate the Marxists and send them out of Afghanistan "clinging to their helicopters", and thus avenge the fall of South Vietnam; Pakistan wished to establish a friendly government in Kabul that would not back Baluch and Pashtun separatists in western Pakistan. The plan was for Jamiat forces to close the Salang Pass paralyzing the Afghan government's supply lines. An interim government, recognized by western nations as the legitimate government of Afghanistan, was to be established in Jalalabad.

=== Battle ===
Involved in the operation were forces of Hezb-e Islami Gulbuddin, Ittehad-e Islami, and Arab fighters, totalling 10,000 men. The attack began on 5 March 1989, and went well at first for the mujahideen, who captured the Jalalabad airfield before being counterattacked. When government troops started to surrender, the attacking forces were soon blocked by the main Afghan Army positions held by the 11th Division, that were protected by bunkers, barbed wire, and minefields. The government troops could count on intensive air support, as the Afghan air force flew 20 sorties a day over the battlefield. An-12 transport aircraft, modified to carry bombs, flew at high altitude out of range of the Stinger missiles used by the mujahideen; cluster bombs were used intensively. Three Scud firing batteries, deployed around Kabul, the 99th Missile Brigade fired more than 400 missiles in support of the Jalalabad garrison. Despite their imprecision, these weapons had a severe effect on the morale of the mujahedeen, who could do nothing to prevent them. The Battle of Jalalabad is considered to be the most concentrated ballistic missile campaign since the V2 Attacks on London in World War II.

By the middle of May, they had made no headway against the defences of Jalalabad, and were running low on ammunition. In July, they were unable to prevent the Afghan Army from recapturing the army base Samarkhel, Jalalabad was still firmly in the hands of Najibullah's government. The mujahideen suffered an estimated 3,000 casualties during this battle, 300 of which were Arab fighters. An estimated 12,000–15,000 civilians were killed, while 10,000 had fled the fighting. The Afghan Army suffered around 1,500 casualties during the battle.

=== Aftermath ===
Contrary to American and Pakistani expectations, this battle proved that the Afghan Army could fight without Soviet help, and greatly increased the confidence of government supporters. Conversely, the morale of the mujahideen involved in the attack slumped and many local commanders of Hekmatyar and Sayyaf concluded truces with the government. The failure of the Battle can be attributed to the failure of Ahmad Shah Masoud's forces to close the Salang Pass allowing Kabul to supply their forces. In the words of Brigadier-General Mohammed Yousaf, an officer of the ISI, "the jihad never recovered from Jalalabad".

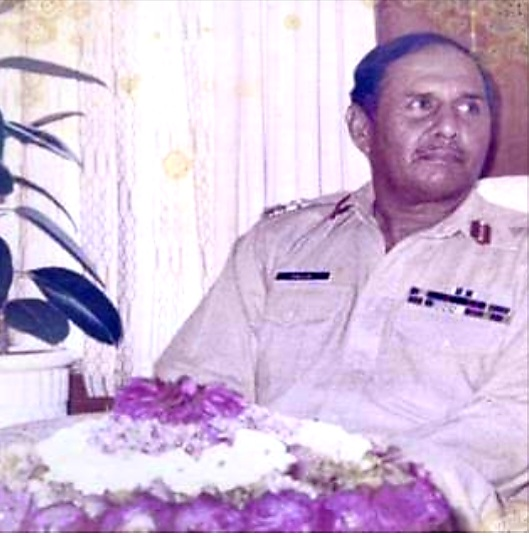
Shamsur Rahman Kallu

Pakistan's plans to promote Hekmatyar were also harmed. Both the Pakistani and the American governments were frustrated with the outcome. As a result of this failure, General Hamid Gul was immediately sacked by Bhutto, and replaced with General Shamsur Rahman Kallu as the Director-General of the ISI. Kallu pursued a more classical policy of support to the Afghan guerillas. In this respect he cut off the barrier that his predecessors, Akhtar Abdur Rahman and Gul had placed between the mujahideen and the American secret service, which for the first time had direct access to the mujahedeen. The former Pakistani spies, such as Gul, had argued that this gave the United States an opportunity to both undercut Pakistan's interests as well as to weave discord among the mujahideen (something which Pakistan's promotion of Hekmatyar had of course done as well).

Indeed, with direct American access to the mujahideen – in particular that of the envoy Peter Tomsen, who viewed independent Afghans as dangerous extremists without direct US supervision – any segment of mujahideen unity crumbled. Traditionally independent mujahideen leaders, such as Mohammad Yunus Khalis, Jalaluddin Haqqani, who had tried to unite the mujahideen rivals Massoud and Hekmatyar, now moved closer towards Pakistan because of their suspicion of the U.S.' intentions. Others, like Haq and Massoud, instead favoured the U.S. because of their tense relations with Pakistan. While Abdul Haq remained hostile towards the communist government and its militias, Massoud would go on to make controversial alliances with former communist figures. Massoud claimed that this was an attempt to unite Afghanistan, but his enemies such as Hekmatyar attacked him for this. Hekmatyar's push were also supported by Pakistan, so that by 1990, there was a definite (if loose) pair of competing axes – one promoted by Pakistan and including Hekmatyar, but also other mujahidin leaders such as Khalis, Jalaluddin Haqqani and other mujahideen leaders who were unsympathetic to Hekmatyar – and the other promoted by the U.S. and led by Massoud, but also including other leaders such as Haq who were unsympathetic to Massoud.

The government forces further proved their worth in April 1990, during an offensive against a fortified complex at Paghman. After a heavy bombardment and an assault that lasted until the end of June, the Afghan Army, spearheaded by Dostum's militia, was able to clear the mujahideen entrenchments.

=== Domestic criticism ===
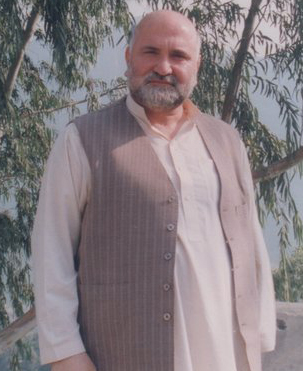
Haji Abdul Haq

The Jalalabad operation was seen as a grave mistake by some mujahideen leaders such as Massoud and Haji Abdul Haq, who did not believe the mujahideen had the capacity to capture a major city in conventional warfare. Neither Massoud nor Haq claimed to have participated in the attack on Jalalabad. This is contradictory, however, as it has been stated Massoud was tasked with closing the Salang Pass, which he failed to do, thus leading to the failure to take Jalalabad. Haq advocated the pursuit of coordinated guerilla warfare, that would gradually weaken the communist regime and cause its collapse through internal divisions. Abdul Haq was also quoted as asking: "How is that we Afghans, who never lost a war, must take military instructions from the Pakistanis, who never won one?" Massoud criticized the go-it-alone attitude of Pakistan and their Afghan followers stating:

"The damage caused by our [mujahideen forces'] lack of a unified command is obvious. There is a total lack of coordination, which means we are not launching simultaneous offensives on different fronts. As a result, the government can concentrate its resources and pick us off one by one. And that is what has happened at Jalalabad."

== Enmity Jamiat-e Islami vs Hezb-e Islami Gulbuddin ==
In June 1990, battles between Jamiat and Hezb-e Islami Gulbuddin in Logar and Parwan caused hundreds of casualties on each side.

== Mujahideen's conquest of Khost (1991) ==
In two weeks' time (14–31 March 1991), mujahideen forces conquered the city of Khost in eastern Afghanistan from the DRA government. The battle was organized by the National Commanders' Shura (NCS) led by Jalaluddin Haqqani and with representatives from all parties of the Islamic Unity of Afghanistan Mujahideen, including Hekmatyar and Sayyaf. One reason why the mujahideen succeeded here, was that once the Soviet Army had left the country, supplying the Government forces in Khost through the air had become too difficult. When the Government's garrison had run out of supplies, the DRA troops massively surrendered to the mujahidin.

After an eleven-year siege, Khost fell to Jalaluddin Haqqani's troops, that were in east Afghanistan, on 11 April 1991, following a negotiated surrender of the communist garrison. This was a coordinated effort where the final push came in an assault with Ibrahim Haqqani acting as stand-in for Jalaluddin, who had been abroad at the time to raise funds and links. The commandant Gul Aqa was captured. It was claimed that much of the garrison had switched sides because the mujahideen fighters were offering amnesty and lenient treatment, partly an indication of Haqqani's skillful diplomacy. There was considerable irritation by Haqqani's forces when some Pakistani outlets claimed that Hekmatyar had acted as leader, in spite of the similarly close relationship between Haqqani and Pakistani soldiers. At this time Pakistan were strongly in favour of Hekmatyar, who would be their primary proxy until 1994 when they switched to Taliban movement. However, Pakistani reporter Rahimulah Yusufzai confirmed that it had been a coordinated effort with Jalaluddin Haqqani as overall leader. Haqqani also offered to mediate between the bitter opponents Massoud and Hekmatyar, though this came to nought.

== Najibullah government weakens (March 1990–January 1992) ==
=== Internal dissensions ===
Despite its military successes, Najibullah's government was still plagued by its traditional internal divisions, namely the opposition between the Khalq and Parcham factions. The DRA defense minister, Shahnawaz Tanai, disagreed with Najibullah's policy of National Reconciliation with the mujahideen and was in favor of turning Kabul's Scud Launchers at Islamabad. He had also become convinced that his Khalq faction was losing its share of power in favour of Najibullah's Parcham. For these reasons he entered in secret negotiations with Hekmatyar, and plotted against Najibullah. Launched on 6 March 1990, his coup failed, despite almost killing Najibullah, and Tanai was forced to flee to Pakistan, where he joined Hekmatyar. A severe repression followed, as Najibullah ordered the army to be purged of Tanai's supporters. In the ensuing fighting, several airports were bombarded, damaging 46 military aircraft. This episode reinforced Najibullah's suspicions and led him to govern through his personal allies rather than the government apparatus, further deepening the rift between Khalqis and Parchamis.

=== Economic crisis ===
By 1992, Afghanistan was in dire straits. Reserves of natural gas, Afghanistan's only export, had dried out since 1989, rendering the country completely dependent on Soviet aid. This amounted to 230,000 tons of food per year, but by 1991, the Soviet economy was itself faltering, preventing the Soviets from fulfilling their commitments.

In August 1991, following his arrival in power, Boris Yeltsin announced that all direct assistance to Najibullah's regime would be curtailed. In January 1992, the Afghan Air Force, which had proved vital to the survival of the regime, could no longer fly any aircraft for lack of fuel. The army was debilitated by food shortages, causing the desertion rate to rise by 60 percent between 1990 and 1991.

The pro-government militias that had grown to replace the army in many of its assignments, were faithful to the regime only so long as it could deliver enough weapons to enable them to conserve their power. With the end of the Soviet aid, the government could no longer satisfy these demands, and the loyalty of the militias began to waver.

=== Ethnic tensions ===
Najibullah's regime became internationally isolated following the loss of its largest supporter. The cut-off of Soviet aid led to food and fuel shortages within Kabul. In January 1992, Najibullah decided to consolidate his power over the non-Pashtuns in Northern Afghanistan who were mistrusted and considered less loyal to the ruling Homeland Party regime. This move came after years of tensions between the Pashtun dominated state institutions such as the Armed Forces and ruling Homeland Party, and the ethnic Uzbek General Abdul Rashid Dostum who said that the Uzbeks and Turkmen would not accept Pashtun command of everything as in the past. These tensions would reach their breaking point when Najibullah received complaints from his fellow Pashtun Kochis of harassment from an ethnic Tajik general, Abdul Momin. Momin had additionally developed secret ties with the Tajik mujahideen warlord Ahmad Shah Massoud and was passing on secret information to Massoud which in combination to his mistreatment of Pashtun kochis led to Najibullah ordering the sacking of Momin which was carried out by Juma Achak, an Achakzai Pashtun who served as Commander of the Northern Zone and was known to hold Pashtun chauvinist views. General Momin was replaced with General Rasul, an ethnic Pashtun Khalqist known for his brutal reputation as commander of Pul-e Charkhi garrison. This move stoked up ethnic tensions between the Pashtun rulers in Kabul and the non-Pashtuns in the north of the country who opposed Najibullah's attempts to restore Pashtun domination over Northern Afghanistan. These tensions would ultimately lead to the defection of Dostum and Momin, who began secret negotiations with Tajik rebel leader Massoud, resulting in the formation of Harakat-e Shamal (the Movement of the North). During this time Najibullah began to negotiate with the Pashtun elements of the mujahideen including Gulbuddin Hekmatyar's Hezbi Islami in an attempt to preserve the Pashtun dominated state institutions of his Homeland Party government. The alliance would topple Najibullah's regime in April 1992.

== Najibullah waning, mujahideen pursue coalition (March 1992) ==
When the Soviet Union dissolved in late 1991, and the new Russian Federation decided to end fuel shipments to Afghanistan, by 1992, Najibullah's government began to collapse.

On 18 March 1992, Najibullah announced his willingness to resign in order to make way for a neutral interim government. This step made him lose internal control; his government broke into several factions. Dostum defected the next day, allied with Hezbe Wahdat and Jamiat mujahideen forces, and took control of Mazar-i-Sharif.

== Armies approach Kabul (1–14 April 1992) ==
On 10 April 1992, the UN presented a plan to the mujahideen parties—of which they approved—to form a pre-interim council on 15 April to accept formal sovereignty from Najibullah. The plan was for the UN to fly that pre-interim council of community and tribal leaders into Kabul on 15 April and then fly Najibullah out of Kabul and out of Afghanistan. Throughout the process, mujahideen forces would remain outside Kabul.

Afghanistan's flags from April to December 1992

However, on 14 April, Jamiat had conquered parts of Parwan Province just north of Kabul and had approximately 20,000 troops stationed around Kabul. By mid-April, Jamiat, Junbish, some Ismaili troops led by Sayyid Mansor, and others took control of Bagram airbase, 70 km north of Kabul.

Hekmatyar and his troops moved up to the southern limits of Kabul. Defecting government forces chose sides with those three mujahideen parties: Jamiat, Junbish, and Hezb-e Islami Gulbuddin, offering them their support in case they'd decide to enter Kabul.

== Hezb-e Islami Gulbuddin invades Kabul (15–23 April 1992) ==
On 15 April 1992, Najibullah was ready to fulfill his role in the plan of 10 April (see above), but the mujahideen parties weren't any longer: some of them now objected against that 10 April agreement. The UN on 15 April did not, as scheduled, fly a pre-interim council into Kabul; apparently, negotiations in Pakistan over such a council were still dragging.

On 16 April, Najibullah was toppled by a coalition of four ethnic Tajik generals, who invited Massoud to enter Kabul to become the new head of state right away, a proposal which Massoud declined. One of the putschists, Deputy Defense Minister Mohammad Nabi Azimi, appeared on Afghanistan National Television, saying: "I assure my countrymen that we will have peace in the very near future. There is no need for war anymore". By 17 April 1992, Dostum's troops controlled Kabul International Airport. Hekmatyar on 17 April had moved close to Kabul and threatened to attack the city "if the present administration fails to transfer power to the mujahideen". Not much later, Pashtun government officials and generals from the Khalq faction, including Generals Aslam Watanjar and Mohammed Rafi, started to allow Hezb-e Islami Gulbuddin into Kabul.

== Militias fight in Kabul (24–27 April 1992) ==
By 24 April 1992, Hekmatyar seemed on the verge of taking control of Kabul, which prompted Massoud's and Dostum's forces to also enter the town, to prevent the establishment of a Hekmatyar dictatorship.

On 25 April, Hekmatyar with Khalqist allies attempted to overtake Kabul. But Massoud's and Dostum's forces were stronger and forced Hekmatyar with hard fighting out of Kabul by 27 April. Hastily now, the mujahideen parties discussing in Peshawar, Pakistan—which did not include Hezb-e Islami Gulbuddin—agreed on their Peshawar Accords which they announced on 26 April, proclaiming a leadership council assuring residual powers for the party leaders under an interim President Sibghatullah Mojaddedi, a religious leader, serving from 28 April to 28 June 1992. Jamiat's leader Burhanuddin Rabbani would then succeed him as interim President until 28 October, and also in 1992 a national shura was to ratify a provisional constitution and choose an interim government for eighteen months, followed by elections. In these Peshawar Accords, Ahmad Shah Massoud was appointed as interim minister of defense for the Mohaddedi government.

By 27 April 1992, Hezb-e Islami Gulbuddin had been pushed south outside Kabul, but new mujahideen groups entered Kabul (Ittehad-e Islami, Hezbe Wahdat, Harakat), rivalling Jamiat and Junbish, all dividing among them the city which was still largely undamaged. The Mojadeddi government was paralyzed right from the beginning which was 28 April 1992, due to rivalling groups contending for total power over Kabul and Afghanistan.

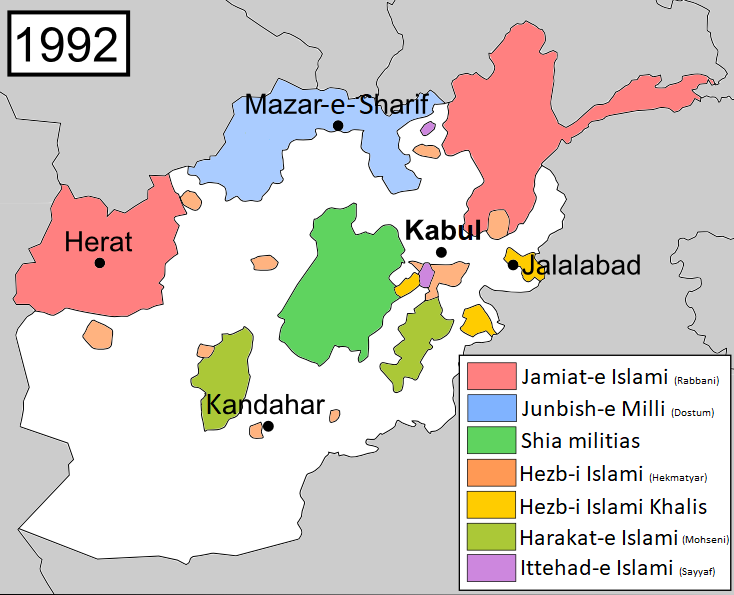
Territorial control in 1992

== Aftermath ==
The rest of April, and May–June 1992, civil war flared up over the control of Kabul, between at least five armies, most of them mujahideen (Islamic resistance parties), most of them sponsored by foreign states or intelligence agency: Hezb-e Islami Gulbuddin, Jamiat, Junbish, Ittehad-e Islami, and Hezbe Wahdat. By the end of 1992, thousands had been killed, half a million residents had fled Kabul, the town badly damaged. Groups would form alliances and break them, peace accords were attempted and failed. War expanded over all Afghanistan.

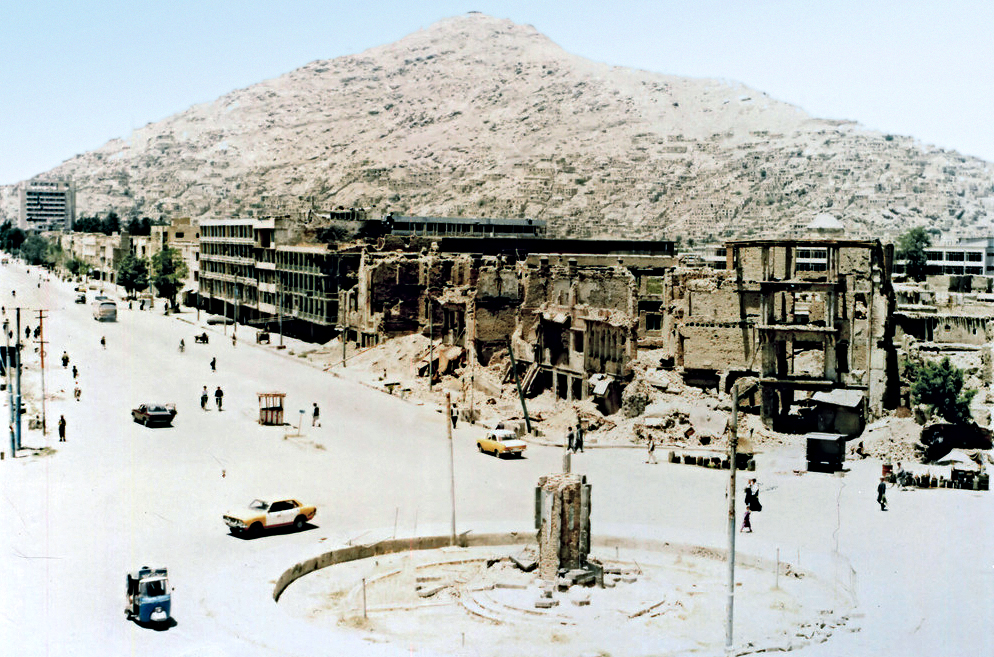
Kabul in 1993

In November 1994, a new Islamic-inspired group and army, the Taliban, gained power. They gradually gained the upper hand, and in September 1996, conquered Kabul. The only group that was left to oppose the Taliban, was Jamiat, who were involved in a conflict with the Taliban between 1996 and 2001. They defended from the north-east of the country and the Taliban were never able to control all of Afghanistan until 2021.

The Taliban ruled most of Afghanistan until October 2001, when they were dethroned by a U.S. coalition with the Northern Alliance, consisting of Jamiat, Shura-e Nazar, Junbish, the Eastern Shura, Harakat-e Islami and Hezbe Wahdat. The UN and US fostered a new government led by Hamid Karzai, who was succeeded in 2014 by Ashraf Ghani. Nevertheless, by August 2021, the Taliban had retaken control of Afghanistan again, and re-established their Islamic Emirate.

== Bibliography ==
- Goodson, Larry P. (2011) [2001]. Afghanistan's endless war: state failure, regional politics, and the rise of the Taliban. Seattle: University of Washington Press. ISBN 978-0-295-80158-2. OCLC 1026403863.
- Gutman, Roy (2008). How we missed the story: Osama bin Laden, the Taliban, and the hijacking of Afghanistan. Washington, D.C.: United States Institute of Peace. ISBN 978-1-60127-024-5. OCLC 165478205.
- Barfield, Thomas J. (2010). Afghanistan: a cultural and political history. Princeton studies in Muslim politics. Princeton: Princeton University Press. ISBN 978-0-691-14568-6.
- Kaplan, Robert D. (2001). Soldiers of God: with Islamic warriors in Afghanistan and Pakistan (1st ed.). New York: Vintage Books. ISBN 978-1-4000-3025-5.
- Saikal, Amin (2004). Modern Afghanistan: A History of Struggle and Survival. I.B. Tauris. ISBN 978-0-85771-478-7.
