= Fazal Haq Mujahid =

Afghan political and military leader (1954-1997)

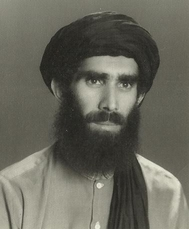
Fazal Haq Mujahid Khaliqyar فضل الحق مجاهد خالقیار Fazal Haq Mujahid
- Born: 1954; Rodat, Nangarhar Province, Kingdom of Afghanistan
- Died: May 31, 1997 (aged 42–43); Peshawar, NWFP, Pakistan
- Cause of death: Assassination
- Education: Kabul University
- Occupation: Mujahideen leader
- Organization: Hezbi Islami
- Military career
- Branch: Military, Civil Government
- Service years: 1975–1997
- Rank: Commander, Lieutenant General
- Nickname: Mujahid
- Unit: Zafar brigade
- Commands: Prominent Mujahideen commander during the Soviet–Afghan War, Head of Nangarhar Garrison, Chairman of Eastern Zone Military Council, Interim Interior Minister of Afghanistan.
- Conflicts: Soviet–Afghan War; Afghan Civil War (1989-1992); Afghan Civil War (1992-1996)

Fazal Haq Mujahid (Note: Pashto: فضل الحق مجاهد) (1954–1997) was an Afghan military leader and politician. An active military and political involvement against the Soviet Union earned him a respected role in the country diverse political spectrum, but was very soon assassinated by unknown gunmen in late 1990s. He was considered to be one of the very few undisputed political leaders who fought the USSR invasion and wanted to carry the victory by establishing or helping to establish a government to solve the political crisis. Because of his efforts, Nangarhar saw an early and balanced administration amid the disagreeable and severe political situations in the country.

== Early life ==
Mujahid was born in 1954 to a highly respected family of Akhunzadgan, his father being Noorulhaq from Rodat district of Nangarhar province. In the 1960s, he earned his basic education at a local school in HisarShahi Village and then went for further education to the city of Lashkargah in Helmand province where he got admission in Agriculture College after completing his Bacaluria. In early 1970s, Mujahid has been admitted in the faculty of Agriculture at Kabul University. There he joined the opposition organization and Central Executive Committee of Hezbi Islami Afghanistan.

== Hezbi Islami career ==
Along the years, Mujahid took various position within the Hezbi Islami party : Deputy chairman of Provincial Affairs Commission of the party, Chairman of Financial Affairs of the party, Chief Mediator of party on some occasions for within party problems and problem with other factions, Commander of Zafar Brigade, Amir of Nangarhar Province, Chairman of Party's Eastern Zone Council (Nangarhar, Laghman, Kunar, Nuristan), few times acting Amir of the Hezbi Islami, One of the Five Members of Nangarhar Shoora Supreme Council, Chairman of Eastern Zone Military Council of Eastern Council and Head of Nangarhar Garrison and once Interior Minister of Afghanistan. He was considered one of the few military commanders and political figures who were not under the direct influence of neighboring country's intelligence agency. He was also one of the few non-controversial war figures of Afghan's war history with USSR.

== Relation with Sudanese government ==
Mujahid was considered to be one of the strongest Political and Military commander of Afghanistan. In very short time he established a strong relation with Sudan's Government. He visited Sudan few times to meet President Omar al-Bashir on various political issues. During his stay in Khartoum, he also met then-Sudanese President close ally Hassan Al-Turabi. The dates of his visit are not clear but the available data shows that he visited Khartoum in late 1993s.

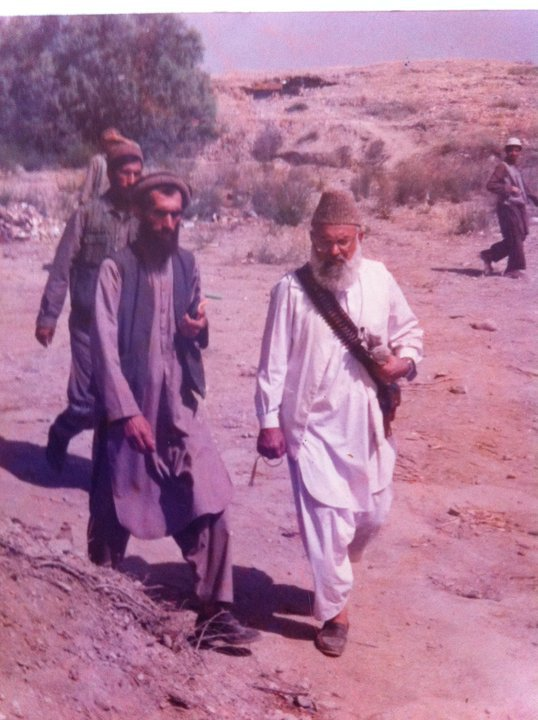
Mujahid can be seen with Pakistan's political figure Qazi Hussain Ahmad during his visit to Afghanistan.

== Assassination ==
Mujahid was assassinated on 31 May 1997 in the town of Hayatabad, Peshawar, the city of KPK, while returning from prayers. He was shot along with another companion, both were dead on the site. His dead body was later transferred to his ancestral graveyard. His assassination remains an enigma, the shooters are unknown to date, many claims that he was assassinated by foreigner intelligence but till date, his killers are a mystery.
