= 99th Missile Brigade =

- Active: 1988–1992
- Country: Republic of Afghanistan
- Type: Tactical ballistic missile unit
- Size: Brigade
- Part of: Afghan Armed Forces
- Garrison/HQ: Kabul, Afghanistan
- Equipment: R-17E (Scud-B) missiles
- Engagements: Soviet–Afghan War; Afghan Civil War (1989–1992); Battle of Jalalabad

The 99th Missile Brigade was a ballistic missile formation of the Afghan Armed Forces. Established during the Soviet withdrawal from Afghanistan in 1988, it operated Soviet-supplied R-17E (Scud-B) missiles. Its position in western Kabul was taken over by mujahideen factions during the collapse of Mohammad Najibullah's government in 1992.

== History ==
=== Establishment and operations ===
According to military historian Steven Zaloga, the brigade was created at Afshur as Soviet forces began withdrawing in 1988. Its missiles were first deployed in November that year. Soviet troops initially provided most of its personnel, with Afghans gradually incorporated into the unit. Its early targets included mujahideen ammunition depots near the Pakistani border.

Scud missiles became an important source of firepower for the Kabul government after the Soviet withdrawal. During the Battle of Jalalabad in 1989, missiles launched from the Kabul area supported the government garrison against attacking mujahideen forces. Lukas Müller estimates that approximately 400 missiles were fired during the battle.

Zaloga records 1,554 launches by the brigade by May 1991, from approximately 1,700 missiles received. For the broader Afghan campaign, Antonio Marshall gives a total of more than 2,000 Scud launches between October 1988 and February 1992. He identifies May and July 1989 as the periods of greatest launch activity and notes that firing six to eight missiles in a day was not uncommon.

=== Collapse in 1992 ===
Zaloga states that Ahmad Shah Massoud's forces captured the Afshur missile base on 24 April 1992, including most of the remaining stockpile of approximately 50 missiles and surviving launch vehicles.

Müller describes the 99th Brigade's position in western Kabul as having been overrun by Hezb-e Wahdat and Harakat-e Islami. According to his account, the trained personnel apparently fled; the factions displayed the captured Scuds in parades but were unable to launch them.
