= Operation Typhoon (1989) =

1989 Soviet operation in Afghanistan

Date	23–26 January 1989 (3 days)
Location	Parwan, Baghlan, Kunduz, Republic of Afghanistan
Result	Afghan-Soviet Victory

Belligerents
Afghanistan; Soviet Union	Afghan Interim Government; Jamiat-e Islami; Supported by: Pakistan

Commanders and leaders
(Afghanistan) Aslam Watanjar (Soviet Union) Boris Gromov	Ahmad Shah Massoud

Units involved
Afghan Army; Soviet Armed Forces; Soviet Army; 40th Army; Su-25 Fighter Jets; 1,000 air sorties; 400 Long-range artillery missions	Unknown

Strength
Unknown	Unknown

Casualties and losses
20+ killed	Soviet claim: 600+ killed; 32 Mortars destroyed; 15 Rocket launchers destroyed; 46 Heavy machine guns destroyed; 10 Supply dumps destroyed; 36 Strong points destroyed; 15 Trucks destroyed
- 1000+ civilians killed

Operation Typhoon was a combined-arms military operation carried out by the Soviet Armed Forces and the Afghan Armed Forces from January 23 to 26, 1989. It was one of the last major military operation conducted by Soviet forces during the Soviet–Afghan War. It targeted Ahmad Shah Massoud's ethnic Tajik mujahideen fighters in the provinces of Parwan, Baghlan, and Kunduz with the aim of "causing as much damage as possible to the opposition forces in the central and northern provinces of the country". Over a thousand civilians in the north of the country were killed during the operation.

A combined arms operation of units and units of the 108th and 201st motorized rifle divisions and other units of OKSVA on a wide front of the provinces of Parwan, Baghlan, Kunduz with the aim of stabilizing the military-political situation in the northeastern zone of the Republic of Afghanistan before the withdrawal of Soviet troops from the DRA. Soviets flew over 1,000 sorties against the Mujahedeen targets, next to conducting hundreds of artillery strikes. This operation, dubbed "Operation Typhoon," killed over 600 of Masooud's fighters, according to Soviet estimates.

The command of the operation was carried out by Lieutenant General B.V. Gromov.

== Prerequisites ==
According to the memoirs of the Hero of the Soviet Union, General Valery Vostrotin, quoted:

We had an agreement with Ahmad Shah Massoud, who at that moment was popular among the other Mujahideen groups, and that he would not interfere with the withdrawal of our troops, whereas we would not fight with him... They say that Shevardnadze insisted on carrying out the operation, or perhaps Najibullah had persuaded him? But in any case, the decision was made by Gorbachev, although the military command, including the army commander, division and regiment commanders were against this operation. We were given the task of destroying Ahmad Shah's group just before leaving. But it's simply dishonest if we had an agreement. We simply knew their work schedule, the locations of their posts and their nightly deployment locations. And then, thirty minutes before they crawl out of their holes and start drinking tea, launch crazy artillery and air strikes on all these points. We simply vilely destroyed them.

== Progress of the operation ==
In order to minimize the losses of the Soviet Army, combat operations were carried out primarily in a non-contact manner: massive aerial bombing and artillery shelling of the positions of the militants of Ahmad Shah Massoud were carried out; tactical missiles were also used

== Results ==
Only a few Soviet soldiers died during the operation; It is impossible to determine the loss of opposition forces. Several dozen villages were destroyed, more than 1,000 civilians died. According to the chief military adviser in the Republic of Afghanistan, Colonel General Mikhail Sotskov, during the fighting quoted:

Afghan women went out onto the road at the pass and threw their dead children under the wheels and tracks of Soviet armored vehicles.

== Aftermath ==
After the operation, Ahmad Shah Massoud sent a letter addressed to the Soviet Ambassador to Afghanistan, Yuli Vorontsov, in which he stated:

The cruel and shameful actions that your people carried out in Salang, and in Jabal al-Sarraj, and other areas in the last days of your stay in this country destroyed all the optimism that had recently emerged. On the contrary, it makes us believe that you want to impose a dying regime on our Muslim people by any means. This is impossible and illogical.

== See also ==
- Battle of Jalalabad
