= Battle of Jalalabad (1989) =

Battle in the Afghan Civil War of 1989–1992

- Part of Afghan Civil War (1989–1992), Afghanistan–Pakistan border skirmishes
- Battle of Jalalabad (1989) (Afghanistan)
Date	March 5 – end of June 1989
Location	Jalalabad, Afghanistan and Salang Pass
Result	Republic of Afghanistan victory
Territorial changes	Republic of Afghanistan regains full control of Jalalabad from opposition forces

Belligerents
Afghanistan: Armed Forces; Supported by: Soviet Union: KGB	Pakistan; Armed Forces; ISI; Afghan Mujahideen/Peshawar Seven; HIG; NIFA; IULA; HIK; Al-Qaeda; Saudi Arabia; Wahhabi volunteers; Supported by: United States; CIA

Commanders and leaders
Afghanistan; (Afghanistan) Mohammad Najibullah; (Afghanistan) Shahnawaz Tanai; (Afghanistan) Mukhtar Gul Zadran †; (Afghanistan) Nur ul-Haq Ulumi; (Afghanistan) Mohammad Sardar Bajauri; (Afghanistan) Khushal Peroz (WIA); (Afghanistan) Abdul Rashid Dostum; (Afghanistan) Mohammed Ehsan; (Afghanistan) Mohammed Asif Delawar; Rasul Pahlawan; Haneef Atmar (WIA)	Pakistan; (Pakistan) Benazir Bhutto; (Pakistan) Hamid Gul; (Pakistan) Mirza Aslam Beg; (Pakistan) Nasir Khan; (Pakistan) Aitzaz Ahsan; HIG; Gulbuddin Hekmatyar; NIFA; Ahmed Gailani; IULA; Abdulrab Rasul Sayyaf; Al-Qaeda; Osama bin Laden (WIA); Saudi Arabia; Ibn Al-Khattab

Units involved
Afghanistan; Afghan Army; 9th Infantry Division; 53rd Infantry Division; 55th Motorized Infantry Brigade; 10th Engineer-Sapper Regiment; 11th Infantry Division; 66th Motorized Infantry Brigades; 71st Motorized Infantry Brigades; 81st Motorized Infantry Brigade; 11th Tactical Ballistic Missile Battalion; 91st Artillery Regiment; Unknown Mechanized battalion; Unknown Howitzer battalion; Afghan Commando Forces; 37th Commando Brigade; Ministry of Interior; 7th Operative Regiment (Sarandoy); 12th Mountain Battalion (Sarandoy); 8th Border Guard Brigade; 10th Border Guard Brigade; WAD; 904th Battalion; Afghan National Guard; 1st Motorized Infantry Brigade; 88th Heavy Artillery Regiment; 22nd Guards Regiment; Afghan Air Force: 355th Fighter-Bomber Aviation Regiment; 377th Helicopter Regiment; 373rd Air Transport Regiment; 12th Squadron; 99th Missile Brigade; Defense of the Revolution	Pakistan; Pakistani Army; 11th Infantry Division; Khyber Rifles (alleged by Kabul); Pakistani volunteers; Pakistan Air Force; Mujahideen; HIG; 5 battalions including a mechanized battalion (during the First Battle of Jalalabad Airport)

Strength
Afghanistan: 13,000 soldiers (initially 12,000)	Pakistan: 6,000 soldiers and volunteers; 2 Border Brigades; Mujahideen; HIG; 3,300 fighters; 11 T-54Ms; 3 BMPs; 2 BTR-60PB; 2 BRDM-2; 55 mortars; 12 howitzers; 79 rocket launchers; HIK; 500 fighters; NIFA; 1,700 fighters; IULA; 1,300 fighters; JNM; 1,300 fighters; HEI; 1,500 fighters; Saudi Arabia: 1,300 volunteers; Total Estimate: 15,000–16,000

Casualties and losses
Afghanistan: 1,500–3,000 killed; 1 Antonov An-26 transport plane destroyed; 1 civilian Antonov An-32 transport plane destroyed; 2 airport employees killed	Pakistan; 300–500: Mujahideen; 3,000–5,000 killed; Heavy losses of armor; Saudi Arabia; 300+ killed
- Civilian casualties: 12,000–15,000 killed

The Battle of Jalalabad (Pashto: د جلال آباد جګړه, Dari: نبرد جلال‌آباد) also known as Operation Jalalabad or the Jalalabad War, was a major battle that occurred in the spring of 1989, marking the beginning of the First Afghan Civil War. The battle broke out following the Peshawar-based Seven-Party Union (an alliance of seven Afghan mujahideen groups also known as the Afghan Interim Government or "government-in-exile"), supported by the Pakistani Inter-Services Intelligence (ISI), attacked Jalalabad, which was then under the administration of the Soviet-backed Republic of Afghanistan.

Although the mujahideen quickly captured the Jalalabad Airport and Samarkhel, the former base of the Soviet 66th Separate Motorized Rifle Brigade, they were successfully recaptured by the Afghan Armed Forces.

== Background ==
The Soviet Union officially withdrew from Afghanistan on February 15, 1989, marking the end of the Soviet–Afghan War. The war was fought between mujahideen guerilla groups (supported by Pakistan, the United States, Saudi Arabia, China, Iran, and other nations) and the Soviet-backed Democratic Republic of Afghanistan. However, the Democratic Republic of Afghanistan, which the mujahideen perceived as a "puppet government", remained in power after the withdrawal.

The mujahideen were supported by Pakistani intelligence. ISI Director Hamid Gul's stated goal was to establish a mujahideen government in Afghanistan, led by Hezb-e Islami Gulbuddin leader Gulbuddin Hekmatyar. Analysts disagree as to whether Pakistan's Prime Minister Benazir Bhutto was kept in the dark about the ISI's plan to overturn Afghanistan or was aware of the attack. One analyst stated that U.S. Ambassador to Pakistan Robert B. Oakley was exhortating this mujahideen attack.

The Americans reportedly were motivated by their wish to humiliate the Marxists and send them out of Afghanistan "clinging to their helicopters" to avenge the fall of South Vietnam. Pakistan wished to establish a friendly government in Kabul that would not support Baloch and Pashtun separatists in western Pakistan. The plan was for Jamiat-e Islami to close the Salang Pass, paralyzing the Afghan Government's supply lines. The plan was to establish an interim government in Jalalabad that would be recognized by western nations as the legitimate government of Afghanistan.

On 6 March 1989, a private meeting was held by Bhutto and ISI officials, responsible for their strategy in Afghanistan, to discuss Hamid Gul's proposal to attack Jalalabad. Bhutto, out of concern for the ISI's plan, invited the U.S. ambassador, Robert Oakley, to attend the meeting. Although Oakley had not received specific instructions from Washington, he attended the meeting. Various strategies were discussed, and former ISI director Hamid Gul promised Bhutto that Jalalabad would fall within a week. Bhutto later noted that Hamid Gul spoke so passionately and confidently that she believed Jalalabad might fall within 24 hours. Steve Coll additionally states that the idea of attacking Jalalabad did not originate with the Mujahideen, rather, it was the Pakistani government, in collaboration with the CIA, that planned the attack and directed the Mujahideen to participate in the operation's execution.

=== Al-Qaeda positions in Nangarhar Province ===
According to Mustafa Hamid, an Egyptian journalist and al-Qaeda member who had close connections to Jalaluddin Haqqani, claimed that the Arab fighters were positioned in a crescent-shaped line surrounding the city, extending from the Saracha line to the left of the main road up to the Jalozai area, covering a distance of about 15 kilometers. They had established approximately 30 posts or bases, with each post housing between 8 and 145 or 300 fighters. These positions were strategically aligned for the occupation of Jalalabad, and they launched a broad offensive against the city.

- In Samar Khel, three posts—two at the bottom of the Samar Khel mountain and the third along the main road leading to Jalalabad. The peak of the mountain was used as an al-Qaeda observation center, but it was elevated and lacked water, so personnel were rotated every 24 hours
- Karez-e-Buzurg Village, located two kilometers south of the Jalalabad Airport
- Zahrani Base (also known as "Farm Two” or “Olive Farms”). Large trenches were dug here and covered with roofs. Heavy weapons were stored here, and at one point, 3,500 BM-14 rockets were kept. It also served as a resting place for al-Qaeda fighters
- Several logistical and reserve bases located in Zahrani (referred to as “Farm Four”)
- Lalmai Village: One of the most important bases, named "Suraqa”, housed thirty Al-Qaeda fighters. Other groups were also concentrated in Lalmai, including Abu Tariq's and Zamari's groups, who eventually captured the Dawlatzai area. This served as the command center for al-Qaeda jihadists in Jalalabad
- Ibrahim Bahraini Base, located between Dawlatzai and Lalmai, commanded by Zamari
- Three posts positioned ahead of Saracha Bridge. They were well-equipped, including anti-armor weapons. These groups would ambush in the canals leading to the main road
- A post near the Afghan Army’s 11th Infantry Division. In this post, alongside Arabs, forty Bengali fighters were also stationed
- Another large post, not far from the 11th Division headquarters, under the command of Abu Humam Saidi. In this base, in addition to Arab fighters, forty Bengali fighters were present and were equipped with a BM-12 device. Over a kilometer to the west, they had another post equipped with a BM-12
- Jalozai Post: Two active tanks were stationed there under the command of Abu Ali Yemeni, while Abu Khalid Masri trained fighters on tank operations. Abu Ali Yemeni was previously a soldier in South Yemen
- The command center post in Lalmai Village had about thirty personnel
- The forward command center post in Lalmai Village was named Sakhri. The Sabaa Layl post was behind the command center in the Lalmai village and was equipped with a BM-12 device
- Qaba Base, situated atop the Samar Khel Mountain, responsible for reporting intelligence on the movements of government forces to other bases
- Behind Qaba Post One, a command center equipped with 82mm mortars was active
- Ghani Khel Post, near the Markore mountain and another post at the junction of the main road with the secondary road leading to Ghani Khel village
- Al-Qaeda base at the Torkham border crossing

== Battle ==
=== Beginning of the battle ===
Involved in the operation were Hezb-e Islami Gulbuddin, Abdul Rasul Sayyaf's Ittehad-e Islami, and Arab fighters totaling 14,000 men. Before the battle, Afghan Arab volunteers from al-Qaeda reportedly cut the corpses of surrendering Afghan Army soldiers into pieces and displayed them to other units in the area. General Syed Quddus, who wrote a book on his experiences during the battle, additionally claimed that the Pakistan Army shelled the city for 4 months. Reports from the Afghan government additionally confirmed that the mujahideen assault on Jalalabad was supported by rocket and artillery fire from Pakistan's 11th Infantry Division. The intense rocket and artillery bombardments on Jalalabad, marked by their scale and severity, not only highlighted the actions of the aggressors but also necessitated the creation of underground shelters, commonly referred to as "bunkers." In response, Jalalabad quickly transformed into a network of bunkers, as local authorities in Nangarhar Province recognised the importance of safeguarding civilians alongside defending the city. Faced with ongoing attacks from the Pakistani Army and its jihadist affiliates, authorities prioritized the protection of Jalalabad's residents. Orders were issued permitting the use of trees from roads and public streets for shelter construction. Local councils, urban organizations, and members of the People's Democratic Party of Afghanistan (then referred to as the Watan Party of Afghanistan) coordinated efforts to provide medical services, food, water, and other essential supplies to the population. Within a week, Jalalabad had become an underground city, with daily life continuing under the constant threat of bombardment.

The attack began on 5 March 1989, and went well at first for the mujahideen, who captured the Jalalabad airfield before facing a counterattack. On 7 March, an Afghan Army base in Samarkhel temporarily fell to the mujahideen but was taken back by June, as well as the entire district in what would be known as the Siege of Samarkhel. On the second day of the battle, according to a report from Chief of Staff Major General Asif Delawar, an estimated force of 10,000 mujahideen fighters, Pakistani, and Arab volunteers launched a coordinate three-pronged offensive towards Jalalabad. Supported by artillery and missile fire, the mujahideen successfully breached the government's defensive positions, leading to the capture of the headquarters of the 11th Infantry Division. Notably, captured Afghan soldiers, prisoners of war, were executed by beheading by the mujahideen.

When government troops began to surrender, the attacking forces were soon blocked by the main Afghan Army positions held by the 11th Division, which were protected by bunkers, barbed wire and minefields. The government troops received on intensive air support, as the Afghan Air Force flew 20 sorties a day over the battlefield. An-12 transport aircraft, modified to carry bombs, flew at high altitude out of range of the Stinger missiles used by the mujahideen; cluster bombs were used intensively. Three Scud firing batteries deployed around Kabul, specifically the 99th Missile Brigade, fired 25 missiles in support of the Jalalabad garrison.

Despite their lack of precision, these weapons had a significant effect on the morale of the mujahideen, who were unable to defend against them. The Battle of Jalalabad is considered to be the most concentrated ballistic missile campaign since the V2 attacks on London during World War II.

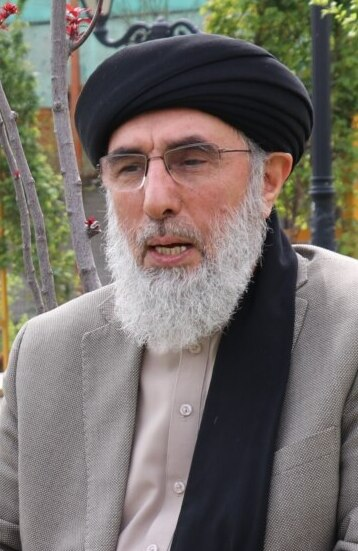
Gulbuddin Hekmatyar

By the middle of May, the mujahideen had made little progress against the defences of Jalalabad, and were running low on ammunition. In July, they failed to prevent the Afghan Army from retaking the army base in Samarkhel. Jalalabad remained under Najibullah's government control. The mujahideen suffered an estimated 3,000 casualties during this battle. Arab foreign fighters sustained over 300 casualties. Approximately 12,000–15,000 civilians were killed, and 10,000 fled the conflict. The Afghan Army reported around 1,500 casualties during the battle. Towards the end of the battle, the ISI-backed Hezb-i-Islami Gulbuddin launched an attack Jamiat-e Islami forces in Takhar Province, resulting in the deaths of 36 of Ahmad Shah Massoud's commanders. In retaliation, Massoud pursued the perpetrators and sent them to face trial in Peshawar, where they were subsequently executed. BBC reporter John Simpson, who was temporarily embedded with Jamiat-e Islami, was not allowed to film or be present during the operation to hunt the perpetrators, under the orders of Ahmad Shah Massoud. Survivors considered men who died in the initial ambush as "lucky", as those of Massoud's men who were captured were subject to mutilation and torture; having their eyes gouged out, noses and ears cut off after having their limbs broken and being disemboweled. Hekmatyar justified the treatment of the prisoners by saying actions like these happen all around the world and that every nation had factions with "slight differences".

== Aftermath ==
Contrary to American and Pakistani expectations, this battle proved that the Afghan Army could fight without Soviet help, and greatly increased the confidence of government supporters. Conversely, the morale of the mujahideen involved in the attack slumped and many local commanders of Hekmatyar and Sayyaf concluded truces with the government.

Both the Pakistani and the American governments were frustrated with the outcome. As a result of this failure, General Hamid Gul was immediately sacked by Benazir Bhutto and replaced with General Shamsur Rahman Kallu as the Director-General of the ISI. Kallu pursued a more classical policy of support to the Afghan guerillas. In this respect he cut off the barrier that his predecessors, Akhtar Abdur Rahman and Gul had placed between the mujahideen and the American secret service, which for the first time had direct access to the mujahideen.

The former Pakistani spies, such as Gul, had argued that this gave the United States an opportunity to both undercut Pakistan's interests as well as to weave discord among the mujahideen (something which Pakistan's promotion of Hekmatyar had of course done as well).

With direct American access to the mujahideen – in particular that of the envoy Peter Tomsen, whose viewed independent Afghans as dangerous extremists without direct U.S. supervision – any segment of mujahideen unity crumbled. Traditionally independent mujahideen leaders, such as Yunus Khalis and Jalaluddin Haqqani, who had tried to unite the mujahideen rivals Massoud and Hekmatyar, now moved closer towards Pakistan because of their suspicion of the U.S.' intentions.

Others, like Abdul Haq and Massoud, instead favoured the United States because of their tense relations with Pakistan. While Abdul Haq remained hostile towards the communist government and its militias, Massoud would go on to make controversial alliances with former communist figures. Massoud claimed that this was an attempt to unite Afghanistan, but his enemies such as Hekmatyar attacked him for this.

Hekmatyar's push was also supported by Pakistan, so that by 1990 there was a definite (if loose) pair of competing axes. One was promoted by Pakistan and included Hekmatyar, Khalis, Jalaluddin Haqqani and other mujahideen leaders who were unsympathetic to Hekmatyar. The competing axis was promoted by the United States and led by Massoud, but also including other leaders such as Abdul Haq who were unsympathetic to Massoud.

The government forces further proved their worth in April 1990, during an offensive against a fortified complex at Paghman. After a heavy bombardment and assault that lasted until the end of June, the Afghan Army spearheaded by Dostum's militia, was able to clear the mujahideen entrenchments. During the final stages of the battle, Hezb-e Islami Gulbuddin reportedly ambushed Jamiat-e Islami fighters, killing 36 of Massoud’s fighters and seven important commanders. Massoud retaliated and captured the perpetrators of the attack, fairly sending them off to partake in a trial in Peshawar, where they were executed.

=== Jalalabad after the battle ===
The defense of Jalalabad during the Afghan Civil War marked a turning point for the government against the mujahideen, Pakistani forces and volunteers from al-Qaeda. The city's defense was led by 40-year-old General Mangal, who was recognized as a "Hero of the Revolution". Mangal was additionally the Mayor of Nangarhar. Under his command, the Afghan Armed Forces successfully repelled the six-month siege on Jalalabad, pushing the Mujahideen 8–20 miles from the city.

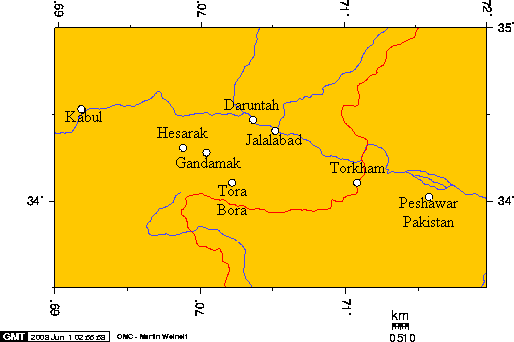
The Torkham border crossing is located near the town of Torkham, by the border (red) of Afghanistan and Pakistan

By the end of June 1989, the government had also recaptured Samarkhel and the village's military base, putting an end to the Siege of Samarkhel. Army leaders proposed advancing into the region between Samarkhel and Torkham border crossing, both lightly defended by the retreating Mujahideen. The government prioritised consolidating its hold on Jalalabad in order to call for peace negotiations with the Afghan Interim Government.

As fighting diminished, the city began to recover. Schools, shops, and mosques reopened, streets filled with activity, and goods became available despite high prices listed as "$12 gasoline, imported cigarettes, cans of Dutch soda and rolls of Chinese toilet paper". Bread, meat, fruit and vegetables were also in adequate supply, although they were twice as expensive compared to their prices in Kabul. The Jalalabad Airport was opened in July, which allowed civilians who had fled to Kabul to return by boarding flights with Antonov An-32 aircraft, containing numerous women and children. Afghan Army personnel deployed to the airport reportedly had to prevent civilians hoping to return to Jalalabad from climbing into the aircraft's rear loading ramp by using their rifle butts.

General Mangal framed the victory as "proof of the government's resilience" and reiterated calls for peace, with other civilians affected by the fighting criticizing American and Pakistani support for the Mujahideen and calling on the U.S. to the end the war.

== Criticism ==
Afghanistan

The Jalalabad operation was seen as a grave mistake by some mujahideen leaders such as Ahmad Shah Massoud and Abdul Haq, who did not believe the mujahideen had the capacity to capture a major city in conventional warfare.

Neither Massoud nor Abdul Haq have participated in the attack on Jalalabad. Massoud claimed it was through BBC radio that he learned about the operation, although other sources allege 500 men from Jamiat-e-Islami took part in the beginning of the battle. Massoud was tasked with closing the Salang Pass, but he advised against it, saying the plan was unsound and would risk the lives of his men, therefore refusing to take part. Haq advocated the pursuit of coordinated guerilla warfare that would gradually weaken the Afghan government and cause its collapse through internal divisions.

Abdul Haq was also quoted as asking: "How is that we Afghans, who never lost a war, must take military instructions from the Pakistanis, who never won one?" Ahmad Shah Massoud criticized the go-it-alone attitude of Pakistan and their Afghan followers stating: "The damage caused by our (Mujahideen forces) lack of a unified command is obvious. There is a total lack of coordination, which means we are not launching simultaneous offensives on different fronts. As a result, the government can concentrate its resources and pick us off one by one. And that is what has happened at Jalalabad."

Pakistan

Former Pakistani Minister of Interior Aitzaz Ahsan claimed that the civilian government knew about the "Jalalabad Operation" beforehand and opposed Hamid Gul's proposal but let the operation happen anyway.

Foreign Fighters

Jihad magazine, an Arabic propaganda magazine known for glorifying the achievements of the Arab foreign fighters in Afghanistan, could not downplay the disastrous defeat at Jalalabad. In its report of the battle, the magazine reported the Afghan communist forces had rained down Scud missiles with two thousand-pound warheads on the Arab fighters resulting in the slaughter of more than a hundred Arab fighters, and that each fallen warrior was soon followed by another rocket taking down another jihadist.

In the account of the battle by Osama bin Laden, the founder of al-Qaeda, bin Laden claimed that the defeat at Jalalabad had inflicted greater casualties on the Arab fighters than they had sustained in the entire war against the Soviets.

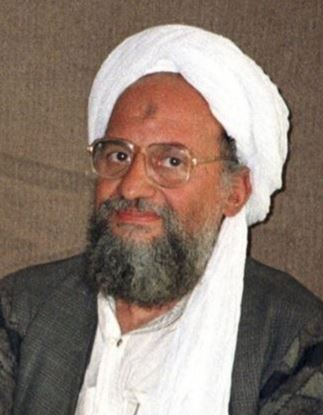
Ayman al-Zawahiri

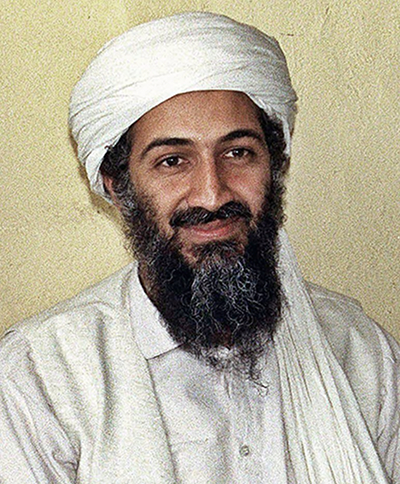
Osama bin Laden

The defeat in Jalalabad led to internal squabbles between al-Qaeda and Maktab al-Khidamat. Ayman al-Zawahiri turned bin Laden against Abdullah Yusuf Azzam, accusing him of mishandling the MAK. Al-Zawahiri accused Azzam of being a puppet of the U.S. and the Saudi Arabian monarchy. He distributed leaflets in Peshawar, depicting Azzam as a questionable Muslim and advising Arabs not to pray with him.

Azzam was later killed by a bomb in November of the same year. While the identity of Azzam's killer remains uncertain, it is possible that it was the work of al-Qaeda or the Egyptian Islamic Jihad affiliated jihadists operating in Pakistan. Bin Laden himself is unlikely to have been involved, as he was in Saudi Arabia at the time of the murder and still on relatively good terms with Azzam. The assassination of Azzam has also been attributed to KhAD.
