= Ibrahim Haqqani =

Ibrahim Haqqani is a citizen of Afghanistan, a prominent member of the Zadran tribe, who served with the Taliban, and was later a high level appointee of Hamid Karzai, the President who replaced the Taliban.

He is a brother of Jalaluddin Haqqani, often described as the Taliban's Senior military leader in Afghanistan. He Approached the NATO forces in 2002 at the behest of Jalaluddin Haqqani and Abdul Jalil, but was instead arrested and tortured. upon his release, Ibrahim Haqqani was appointed a governor by Hamid Karzai, the more diplomatic president.

When the US Senate's Intelligence Committee it published a 600-page unclassified summary of its investigation the CIA torture program it confirmed that Haqqani had been held by the CIA in its archipelago of black sites.
