= Soviet withdrawal from Afghanistan =

Final phase of the Soviet–Afghan War

- Part of the Afghan conflict and the Cold War
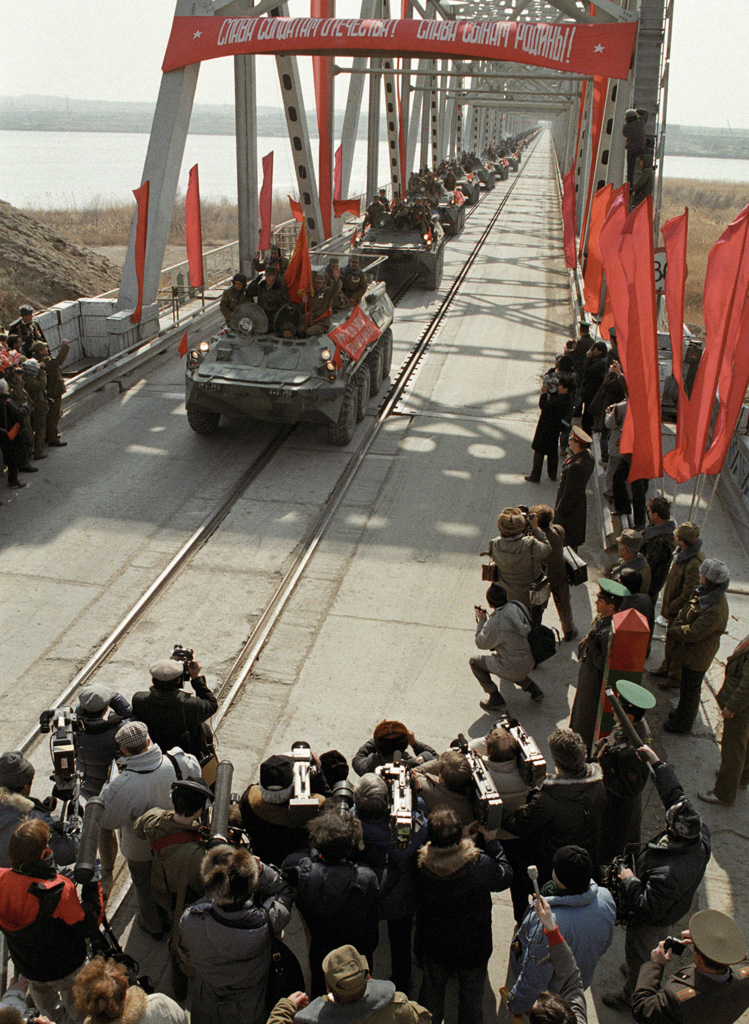
- Final column of Soviet troops, consisting of BTR-80s, entering the Uzbek SSR by way of the Hairatan Bridge (15 February 1989)
Date	15 May 1988 – 15 February 1989 (9 months)
Location	Central Asia and South Asia
Result	Afghan mujahideen victory: End of the Soviet–Afghan War; Beginning of the Afghan Civil War

Belligerents
Soviet Union; Afghanistan	Afghan Mujahideen; Jamiat-e Islami; Hezb-e Islami Gulbuddin; Hezb-e Islami Khalis; Supported by: Pakistan; Saudi Arabia; Turkey; United States; United Kingdom; China

Commanders and leaders
Boris Gromov; Valentin Varennikov	Ahmad Shah Massoud; Gulbuddin Hekmatyar

Casualties and losses
523 killed	Unknown

Pursuant to the Geneva Accords of 14 April 1988, the Soviet Union conducted a total military withdrawal from Afghanistan between 15 May 1988 and 15 February 1989. Headed by the Soviet military officer Boris Gromov, the retreat of the 40th Army into the Union Republics of Central Asia formally brought the Soviet–Afghan War to a close after nearly a decade of fighting. It marked a significant development in the Afghan conflict, having served as the precursor event to the First Afghan Civil War.

Mikhail Gorbachev, who became the General Secretary of the Communist Party of the Soviet Union in March 1985, began planning for a military disengagement from Afghanistan soon after he was elected by the Politburo. Under his leadership, the Soviet Union attempted to aid the consolidation of power by the People's Democratic Party of Afghanistan (PDPA); the Afghan president Mohammad Najibullah was directed by the Soviets towards a policy of "National Reconciliation" through diplomacy between his PDPA government and the rebelling Islamists of the Afghan mujahideen.

In the context of the Cold War, the dynamic of the Soviet Union–United States relationship showed signs of improvement, as it had become increasingly clear to the Soviet government that propping up Najibullah's government in Kabul would not produce sufficient results to maintain the PDPA's power in the long term. Following the Soviet withdrawal from Afghanistan, Gorbachev's government continued to militarily and politically support Najibullah against the Afghan opposition, though this aid was abruptly halted due to the dissolution of the Soviet Union in December 1991. The ensuing collapse of Najibullah's government in April 1992 triggered the Second Afghan Civil War, in which the Pakistan-backed Taliban was victorious.

== Prelude ==
Understanding that the Soviet Union's troublesome economic and international situation was complicated by its involvement in the Afghan War, Gorbachev "had decided to seek a withdrawal from Afghanistan and had won the support of the Politburo to do so [by October 1985]". He later strengthened his support base at the top level of Soviet government further by expanding the Politburo with his allies. To fulfill domestic and foreign expectations, Gorbachev aimed to withdraw having achieved some degree of success. At home, Gorbachev was forced to satisfy the hawkish military-industrial complex, military leadership, and intelligence agencies (later, Gorbachev would tell UN Envoy Diego Cordovez that the impact of the war lobby should not be overestimated; Cordovez recalls that Gorbachev's advisors were not unanimous in this pronouncement, but all agreed that disagreements with the US, Pakistan, and realities in Kabul played a bigger role in delaying withdrawal). Abroad, Gorbachev aimed to retain prestige in the eyes of third-world allies. He, like Soviet leaders before him, considered only a dignified withdrawal to be acceptable. This necessitated the creation of stability within Afghanistan, which the Soviet Union would attempt to accomplish until its eventual withdrawal in 1988-9. Three objectives were viewed by Gorbachev as conditions needed for withdrawal: internal stability, limited foreign intervention, and international recognition of the Democratic Republic of Afghanistan's Communist government.

=== PDPA's "National Reconciliation" ===
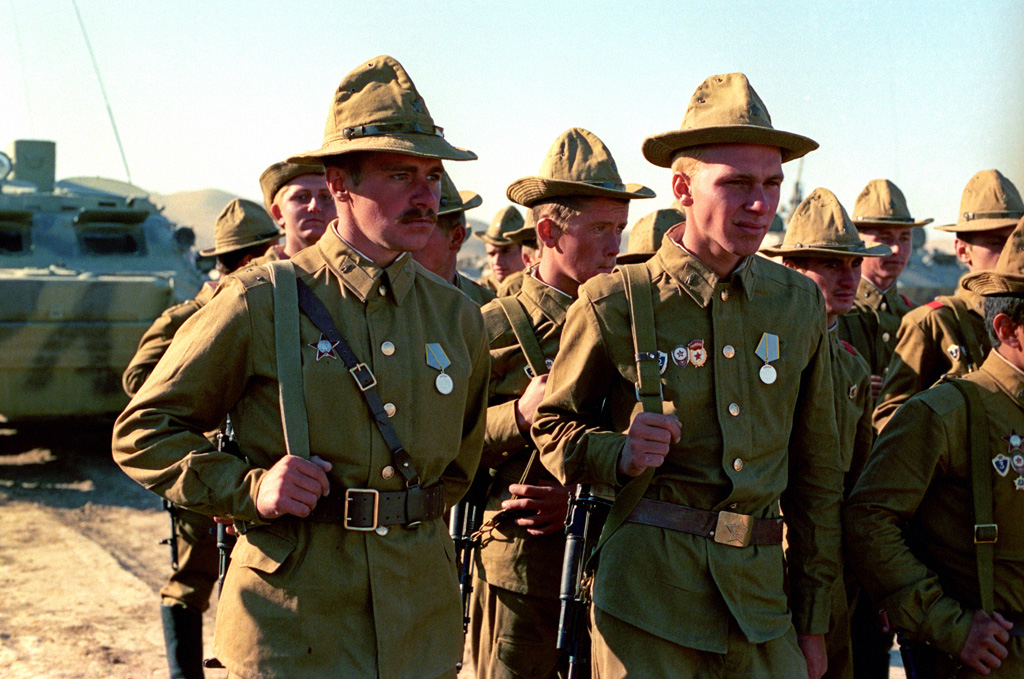
Soviet soldiers returning from Afghanistan, 18 October 1986, in Kushka, Turkmen SSR.

After the death of Leonid Brezhnev, the political will for Soviet involvement in Afghanistan dwindled. The level of Soviet forces in the country was not adequate to achieve exhaustive military victory, and could only prevent the allied DRA from losing ground. The Soviet Union began the gradual process of withdrawal from Afghanistan by installing Muhammed Najibullah Ahmadzai as the General Secretary of the Afghan Communist Party, seeing him to be capable of ruling without serious involvement from the Soviet Union. Babrak Karmal, Najibullah's predecessor, was deemed by the Soviet leadership to be an obstacle to both military withdrawal and the diplomatic process. Although Soviet military, diplomatic and intelligence agencies were not singleminded about his appointment, Najibullah was seen as a leader that could work with the Soviet Union in order to find a negotiated settlement. Mirroring shifts within the USSR itself, the Soviet effort in Afghanistan placed "a much greater emphasis on pacification through winning over rebel commanders" rather than transforming "Afghanistan along Marxist lines [,] winning over the population through economic incentives and establishing a party and government influence in the cities and countryside". As a whole, the policies the Soviet Union and their allies powers in Afghanistan pursued after the transition of power from Babrak to Najibullah were referred to as the Policy of National Reconciliation

To achieve reconciliation, the Soviet Union dedicated a serious effort to helping the Najibullah government establish relations with rebel factions, sent record packages of aid, and promised that "absolutely all of the military infrastructure would be handed over to the DRA armed forces" upon Soviet withdrawal. Najibullah achieved considerable success in reinvigorating the government security apparatus, and consolidating his power within the state. This, however, may have encouraged the Soviets to place excessive trust in Najibullah, and did not achieve the primary objective: meaningfully incorporating the opposition into Najibullah's support base. Kalinovsky writes:

Vadim Kirpichenko, deputy chief of the KGB First Directorate, later wrote that Najibullah's success in establishing more control within Kabul and some sectors of the government led them to believe that they had found a solution that could be replicated everywhere in Afghanistan: "Faith in Najibullah and in the dependability of his security organs created illusions on the part of the KGB leadership. . . . These dangerous illusions, the unwillingness to look truth in the face, delayed the withdrawal of Soviet troops by several years." (99)

The Soviet-led attempts to encourage reconciliation were also complicated by mid-level military commanders, both Soviet and Afghan. While the military and political leadership of the USSR worked with the Najibullah government on raising the level of cooperation with rebel and tribal leaders, Soviet "mid-ranking officers sometimes failed to grasp the political significance of their operations" and the Afghan army had to be convinced "to stop calling the opposition "a band of killers," "mercenaries of imperialism," "skull-bashers,"'. Nevertheless, some progress was achieved by Soviet intelligence agencies, military and diplomats in improving relations with rebel factions. The canonical example is the establishment of tentative collaboration with noted rebel commander and Afghan National Hero (posthumously) Ahmad Shah Massoud. Here too, however, relations were complicated by mid-level military realities, and even by Najibullah himself. Although the Soviet military leadership and diplomats had been in contact with Massoud since the early 1980s, military operations against his troops, the DRA's insistence on his disarmament, and information leaks about his relations with the Soviets derailed progress towards achieving a formal ceasefire with him. Conversely, Najibullah was in ostensibly regular contact with unnamed rebel leaders "through certain channels", as Cordovez found out during his first meeting with the Afghan leader.

==== Ineffectiveness and Soviet disenchantment ====
Political reforms were enacted by the DRA government and their Soviet allies as part of the Policy of National Reconciliation. Generally, these reforms can be characterised as seeking to allow rebel factions to align with the government and state order in Afghanistan by stripping it of its Marxist-revolutionary agenda. Throughout 1987 the Democratic Republic of Afghanistan was renamed the Republic of Afghanistan, participation of all political parties in government was permitted conditional on their non-violence towards each other, and Afghanistan's Islamic identity was reassumed. These political reforms were met by scepticism from rebel leaders and PDPA members alike, and were generally unproductive. Cordovez and Harrison write:

Najibullah's policy of "national reconciliation" went just far enough to antagonize hard-liners in the PDPA but not far enough to win over significant local tribal and ethnic leaders to support of his government.

Within the ruling party, the Policy of National Reconciliation was criticised by those who believed it would result in the PDPA losing power over the country, while the opponents of the PDPA and the Soviet Union dismissed the efforts as propaganda. Hampered by the slow pace at which top-level policy decisions were implemented on the ground, and realising that the Policy of National Reconciliation by itself would not result in a favourable outcome, the Soviet leadership began looking for alternate ways to create the necessary degree of stability in Afghanistan for a withdrawal to be permissible.

Beginning in early 1987, Soviet faith in the Policy of National Reconciliation in the format in which it was initially conceived began to falter. While previously the preeminence of the PDPA in leadership, and the desired identity of Najibullah as the party leader was indisputable for the Soviet leadership, now the "emerging consensus in the Politburo was that the PDPA would be but one of the political forces in power after Soviet troops left. Even Vladimir Kryuchkov and Andrei Gromyko agreed that reconciliation would mean accepting that the PDPA would lose its leading position". In a personal meeting on the July 20, 1987, Gorbachev again attempted to impress on Najibullah the need to incorporate opposition leaders into the Afghan government, but this effort, like earlier, was weakened by Najibullah's biliateral conversations with Eduard Shevardnadze and Kryuchkov. Najibullah retained a strong hold over Kabul and the government apparatus – bar internal divisions within the PDPA – but was not able to incorporate the opposition into the government in any meaningful way, instead giving out "relatively powerless posts to prominent non-PDPA personalities who had until then neither supported nor opposed the government."

=== Pakistani and American interference in Afghanistan ===
Faced by the failure of the Policy of National Reconciliation to stabilise the country by itself, and hoping to benefit from the gradually thawing relationship with the United States, the Soviet Union pushed forward with its effort to attain a diplomatic solution that would limit Pakistani and American interference in Afghanistan. Throughout 1987, Soviet diplomats attempted to convince the United States to stop supplying the mujahideen with weaponry as soon as Soviet forces withdrew, and to reach an agreement on a power-sharing proposal that would permit the PDPA to remain a key actor in Afghan politics. Najibullah was receptive to the prior, but the Soviet Union did not manage to come to this agreement with the United States. From statements made by Secretary of State George Shultz, the Soviet leadership came under the impression that the US would cease military shipments to the mujahideen immediately after Soviet withdrawal, with the condition that the USSR "front-loaded" its withdrawal (i.e. withdrew the majority of its troops in the beginning of the process, thereby complicating redeployment). This was conveyed to the Najibullah government, managing to convince him that the Soviet-American diplomatic effort would benefit the Kabul government.

This impression made by Shultz was false – though mixed signals were sent by various US officials at and around time of the summit, Reagan could not agree to stop arms shipments immediately . In late 1987, when this US commitment was conveyed to the Soviet Union, negotiations came to a halt, but proceeded tentatively as the White House and Department of State continued to make contradictory statements on the issue. The issue dissipated when the Department of State suggested that an immediate cessation of US military aid could occur if the Soviets did the same (prior, the US had agreed to an asymmetric cessation of aid, whereby the USSR would be allowed to continue supporting Kabul). On February 8, 1988, the Soviet leadership announced a conditional date for the beginning of the military withdrawal (which the United States had insisted on for years) in an attempt to encourage the US to compromise on ceasing military shipments. This announcement failed to change the American position on shipments, and simultaneously decreased Soviet bargaining power at the negotiations. Nevertheless, Gorbachev decided that

it was desirable to withdraw within the framework of an international agreement, however flawed, rather than to proceed independently. "We weren't thinking only of Afghanistan," recalled Vadim Zagladin. "There were many processes taking place at that time. The INF agreement on missiles in Europe was particularly important, and all of these things were interconnected."

This factor complicated convincing Najibullah to agree to the Geneva Accords, but he was eventually placated by Soviet promises to dramatically expand aid and assistance measures post-withdrawal. Although the USA was not bound under the Geneva Accords to cease its military aid, Pakistan (through which this aid flowed) was obligated to prevent cross-border armament flows to Afghanistan (Kalinovsky 149). On April 14, 1988 the Geneva Accords were signed between Pakistan and Afghanistan, with the USSR and US acting as guarantors, stating provisions for the withdrawal of Soviet forces and mutual non-interference between Pakistan and Afghanistan.

== Withdrawal ==
=== Attacks on departing Soviet personnel ===
The withdrawal of the Soviet military began on 15 May 1988, under the leadership of General of the Army Valentin Varennikov (with General Gromov commanding the 40th Army directly). As agreed, the withdrawal was "front-loaded", with half of the Soviet force leaving by August. The withdrawal was complicated, however, by the rapid deterioration of the situation in Afghanistan. While the United States was not bound by any commitment to stop arms shipments and continued to supply the Afghan mujahideen in Pakistan, the latter was not delivering on its commitment to prevent weaponry and militants from flowing into Afghanistan through the Durand Line. Likewise, the mujahideen also continued their attacks on withdrawing Soviet forces. The Soviet Union repeatedly reported these violations of the Geneva Accords to United Nations monitoring bodies, and even pleaded with the United States to influence the factions that they were supplying. The desire of the Soviet Union to withdraw, however, coupled with the United States' inability to control the behaviour of the mujahideen, meant that the Soviet objections did not yield any results.

==== Response and disagreements ====
As the Soviet military withdrawal and rebel attacks continued, the deteriorating security of the Najibullah government caused policy disagreements between the different services of the Soviet Union. For example: while the Soviet military had succeeded in establishing a de facto cease-fire with Ahmad Shah Massoud's forces as Soviet troops withdrew through territories under his control, the KGB and Shevardnadze attempted to convince Gorbachev that an attack on Massoud was necessary to guarantee Najibullah's survival. In the words of Soviet military commanders, Najibullah himself also aimed to retain the Soviet military in Afghanistan – Generals Varennikov (in charge of the withdrawal operation), Gromov (commander of the 40th Army), and Sotskov (chief Soviet military advisor in Afghanistan) all pleaded with top Soviet military and political leadership to control Najibullah's attempts to use Soviet troops to achieve his own security, and to convey to him that the Soviet military would not stay in Afghanistan. After the departure of Yakovlev from the Politburo in the fall of 1988, Gorbachev adopted the Shevardnadze-KGB line of policy regarding supporting Najibullah at the cost of antagonising rebel factions, and a halt of the withdrawal was ordered on November 5, 1988. In December, Gorbachev decided to resume the withdrawal, but also to carry out an operation against Massoud, ignoring arguments from his advisors and military commanders on the ground. In January 1989, the Soviet withdrawal continued, and on January 23 Operation Typhoon began against the forces of Ahmad Shah Massoud. Up until the end of the military withdrawal, Shevardnadze and the head of the KGB unsuccessfully attempted to convince Gorbachev to retain a contingent of Soviet military volunteers in Afghanistan to defend land routes to Kabul. On February 15, the 40th Army finished their withdrawal from Afghanistan. General Gromov walked across the "Bridge of Friendship" between Afghanistan and the USSR last. When Gromov was met by Soviet TV crews while crossing the bridge, he swore at them profusely when they tried to interview him. Recalling the events in an interview with a Russian newspaper in 2014, Gromov said that his words were directed at "the leadership of the country, at those who start wars while others have to clean up the mess."

== Aftermath ==
Soviet support for the Najibullah government did not end with the withdrawal of the regular troops. Aid totalling several billion dollars was sent by the Soviet Union to Afghanistan, including military aircraft (MiG-27s) and Scud missiles. Due primarily to this aid, the Najibullah government held onto power for much longer than the CIA and State Department expected. The mujahideen made considerable advances following the withdrawal of the Soviet contingent, and were even able to take and control several cities; nevertheless, they failed to unseat Najibullah until the spring of 1992. Following the coup of August 1991, the Soviet Union (and later the Russian Federation under Boris Yeltsin) cut aid to their Afghan allies. This had a severe impact on the Hizb-i Watan (formerly known as the PDPA), and on the armed forces, already weakened by their fight against the mujahideen and internal struggles – following an abortive coup attempt in March 1990, the Army (already encountering a critical lack of resources and critical rates of desertion) was purged. Ultimately, the cessation of Soviet aid and the instability that it caused allowed the mujahideen to storm Kabul. Najibullah was removed from power by his own party, after which the mujahideen futilely attempted to form a stable coalition government. Disagreements and infighting between the likes of Massoud and Gulbuddin Hekmatyar set the stage for the eventual rise of the Taliban.

== See also ==
- American withdrawal from Afghanistan (2020–2021)
