= National Islamic Front of Afghanistan =

Primarily Pashtun Sufi political party in Afghanistan

National Islamic Front of Afghanistan د افغانستان ملي اسلامي جبهه
- Leader: Hamed Gailani (since 2017)
- Founder: Ahmed Gailani
- Founded: 1979; 47 years ago
- Headquarters: Kabul
- Ideology: Afghan nationalism; Pashtun Interests; Royalism (formerly)
- Political position: Right-wing
- Religion: Sunni Islam
- Seats in the Leadership Council: 0 / 30

Party flag

Website
- Facebook page

National Islamic Front of Afghanistan
- د افغانستان ملي اسلامي جبهه
- Leader: Ahmed Gailani
- Dates active: 1979–1989 (Part of Afghan Mujahideen); 1989–1992 (1st government as Interim); 1992–2001 (2nd government); 2001–present (as political party)
- Country: Afghanistan
- Ideology: Afghan nationalism; Anti-communism; Royalism
- Part of: Afghan Mujahideen (1979–1989); Interim Afghan Government (1989–1992); Islamic State of Afghanistan (1992–2001); (Afghanistan) Northern Alliance (1996–2001)

National Islamic Front of Afghanistan (Pashto: د افغانستان ملي اسلامي جبهه; Da Afganistan Melli Islami Jabha) is a political party in Afghanistan. It has been led, since its founding, by members of a prominent Sufi family, the Gailani. It is primarily (but not exclusively) a Pashtun party, followers of the Sufi holy man Pir Sayyid Ahmed Gailani have a reputation for moderate thought and the traditional mystical and introspective religious currents that characterize Sufism in that sect.

== History ==
=== Formation & role in the Soviet War in Afghanistan ===
The party was formed in 1979 in Peshawar, Pakistan, where Gailani had fled to following the rise to power of the communist PDPA in Afghanistan. The party was largely moderate and royalist, with ties to the former royal family.

This party was a member of the Peshawar Seven and was used by the Pakistani ISI for distributing CIA-funded weapons to the mujahideen fighting the Soviet occupation. NIFA had the most liberal and secular stance of all the Peshawar parties, and it supported the return of King Zahir Shah from exile. Representing the interests of the pre-war Pashtun establishment, it rejected both communism and Islamism, in favour of "nationalism and democracy." The party line emphasized freedom for individuals, the press, and organizations, whilst advocating the separation of powers of government.

The party had a local following in Paktia and Nangarhar, partly due to family tribal ties of Gailani.

Gailani's constituency was drawn from the following of the Qadiryyah, and his group functioned like a Sufi order, greatly hampering its efficiency as a political and military organisation. The followers of the pir always expected to interact with him personally, which meant that the party functioned like a court, centered on Gailani and his children, rather than like a modern party. No decision was ever delegated. The quantity of weapons a NIFA mujahideen commander could expect to receive depended mostly on his personal relation with the pir. Also the pir's tradition of generosity led to many abuses, with many party officials receiving essentially fictitious posts through personal contacts.

Despite this, NIFA remained the most popular party among the Afghan refugees living in Pakistan. A poll carried out in 1987 revealed that 456 refugees out of a sample of 2,000 supported NIFA, which was the highest score of any of the mujahideen parties. By contrast, the Pakistanis, judging the group inefficient allocated NIFA only 10-11 percent of the weapons procured by the CIA, with a much larger share going to Islamist groups, in particular Hekmatyar's Hezb-e-Islami Gulbuddin.

=== Following the Soviet Withdrawal ===
During the 1990s, it was a minor party within the Northern Alliance.

In 1991, they fought in Kuwait against Ba'athist Iraq during the Gulf War.

Gailani supported the candidacy of Karzai in the 2004 presidential election.

In November 2009 Lal Mohammad, a senior official in the party was assassinated by gunmen mounted on a motorcycle.
