= Islamic Unity of Afghanistan Mujahideen =

Sunni Afghan alliance formed in 1980s

- Founded: 1988 (de facto existed since May 1979)
- Dissolved: 1992
- Merged into: Northern Alliance
- Headquarters: Peshawar, Pakistan
- Ideology: Islamism; Anti-communism
- Political position: Right-wing
- Religion: Sunni Islam

The Islamic Unity of Afghanistan Mujahideen, also known as the Seven Party Mujahideen Alliance, or Peshawar Seven was an alliance formed in 1988 (see Alliance Formation below) by the seven Afghan mujahideen parties fighting against the Soviet-backed Democratic Republic of Afghanistan forces in the Soviet–Afghan War. The alliance sought to function as a united diplomatic front towards the world opinion, and sought representation in the United Nations and Organisation of the Islamic Conference.

The constituents of the Peshawar Seven alliance fell into two categories, the political Islamists: Hezb-e Islami Khalis (Khalis), Hezb-e Islami Gulbuddin (Hekmatyar), Jamiat-e Islami (Rabbani), and Ittehad-e Islami (Sayyaf), and the traditionalists: Mahaz-e Milli (Gailani), Afghanistan National Liberation Front (Mojaddedi), and Revolutionary Islamic Movement (Mohammadi).

All of the groups were Sunni Muslims, and all were majority Pashtun except Jamiat-i-Islami, which was predominantly Tajik. They were called the Peshawar 7 and were supported by the United States, Saudi Arabia and Pakistan. Another, smaller but dominant Mujahideen alliance, was composed of mainly Shi'a Muslims. It was named the Tehran Eight – an alliance of eight Shia Afghan factions, supported by Iran.

In February 1989 the groups attempted to form a coalition government in exile from Peshawar, which they called the Afghan Interim Government (AIG). The AIG aimed to base themselves in the city of Jalalabad and attack the administration in Kabul. However, the mujahideen failed to win the 1989 Battle of Jalalabad.

Although Islamic Unity of Afghanistan Mujahideen alliance took its formal shape in the mid-1980s, it had de facto existed as a political bloc since May 1979, when the Pakistani government decided to limit the flow of foreign financial aid, mainly from the United States (under the Reagan Doctrine) and Saudi Arabia, to the said seven organizations, thus cutting off monetary supply to nationalist and leftwing resistance groups.

== Alliance formation ==
Though the 2 primary scholars on this issue agree that the coalition was founded, under pressure from the United States, Saudi Arabia and Pakistan, as a coalition of groups fighting against the Soviet occupation of Afghanistan, there are disparate claims about when the coalition was formed, and who was responsible for funding it. According to Tom Lansford, the author of A Bitter Harvest: US Foreign Policy and Afghanistan, the group was formed in 1985 and financed by Saudis. However, Vijay Prashad, Director of the International Studies Program at Trinity College, Hartford, Connecticut, asserts that the foundation occurred earlier, in 1981, and specifically cites Osama bin Laden as one of the primary Saudi financiers.

== Members of the alliance ==
There were seven members of the Mujahedeen Alliance of Afghanistan, a predominantly Sunni Islamic union, with one Sufi order organization member. It consisted of:

Pashto/Persian name	Latin transliteration	English name	Leader
حزب اسلامی گلبدین	Hizb-e Islami Gulbuddin	Islamic Party (Gulbuddin faction)	Gulbuddin Hekmatyar
حزب اسلامی خالص	Hizb-e Islami Khalis	Islamic Party (Khalis faction)	Mulavi Younas Khalis (died 2006)
جمعیت اسلامی افغانستان	Jamiat-e Islami	Islamic Society	Burhanuddin Rabbani (killed 2011)
شوراء نظار	Shura-e Nazar (an offshoot of Jamiat-e Islami)	Supervisory Council of the North	Ahmad Shah Massoud (killed 2001)
اتحاد اسلامی برای آزادی افغانستان	Ittehad-e Islami bara-ye Azadi-ye Afghanistan	Islamic Union for the Liberation of Afghanistan	Abdul Rasul Sayyaf
حمحاذ ملی اسلامی افغانستان	Mahaz-e Milli-ye Islami-ye Afghanistan	National Islamic Front for Afghanistan	Ahmed Gailani (died 2017)
جبه نجات ملی	Jebh-e-Nejat-e Melli	National Liberation Front	Sibghatullah Mojaddedi (died 2019)
حرکت انقلاب اسلامی افغانستان	Harakat-i-Inqilab-i-Islami	Islamic Revolutionary Movement	Mohammad Nabi Mohammadi (died 2002)

== Bibliography ==
- Kaplan, Robert D. Soldiers of God: With the Mujahidin in Afghanistan. Boston: Houghton Mifflin Company, 1990. ISBN 0-395-52132-7
- Weisman, Steven R. "Rebel Rivalry is Hampering Afghan Talks", The New York Times, March 1, 1988.
