= Fall of Kabul (2001) =

United States-led coalition capture of the capital of Afghanistan

Coordinates: 34.5256°N 69.180°E

- Part of the war on terror, the United States invasion of Afghanistan and the War in Afghanistan (2001–2021)
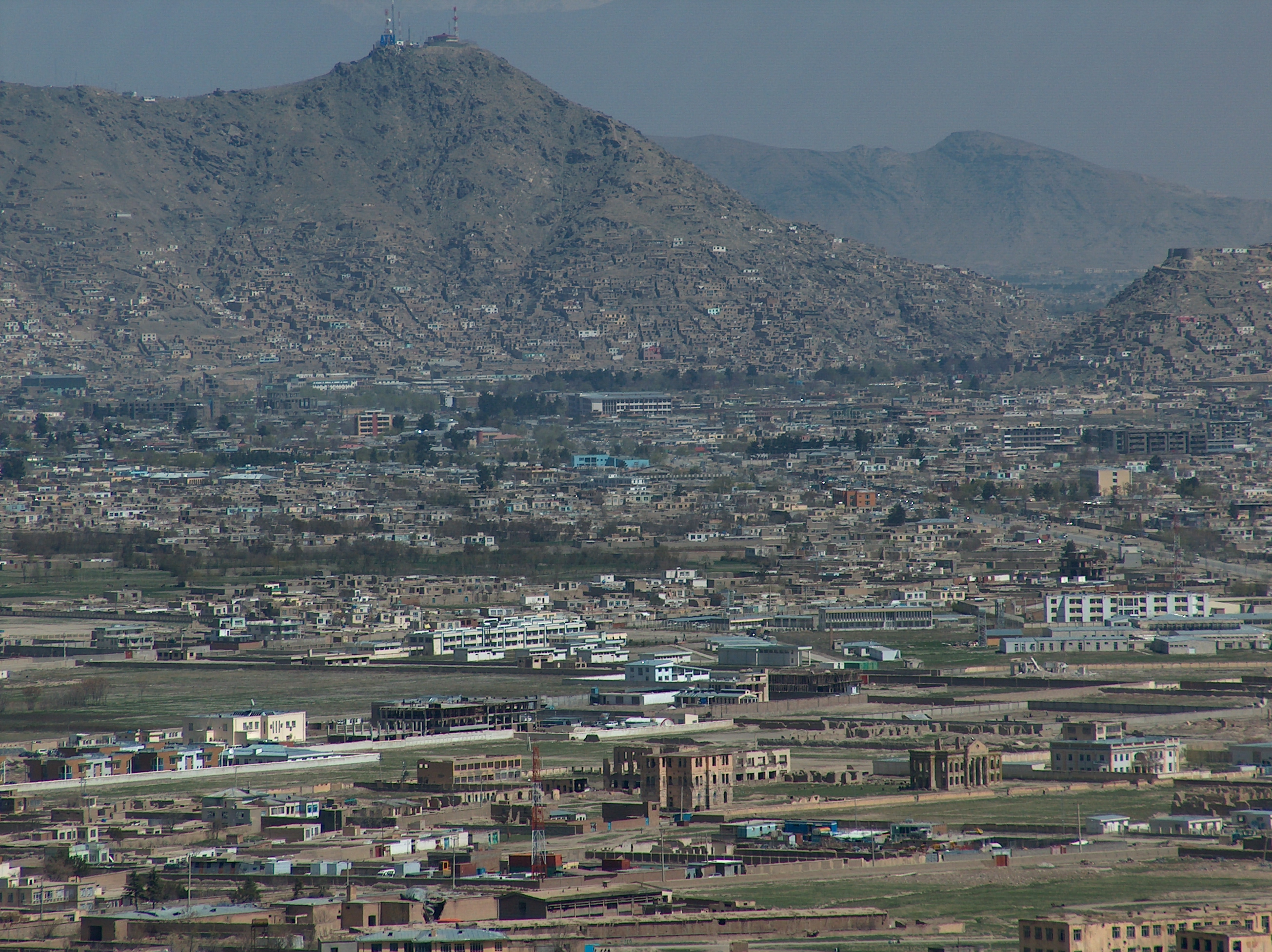
- Kabul in December 2003
Date	13–14 November 2001 (1 day)
Location	Kabul, Afghanistan
Result	Northern Alliance and American victory: Re-establishment of the Islamic State of Afghanistan as the dominant power in Afghanistan; Taliban and al-Qaeda forces, including Osama bin Laden, withdraw to Kandahar and Tora Bora.

Belligerents
Islamic State of Afghanistan; United States	Islamic Emirate of Afghanistan; Al-Qaeda

Commanders and leaders
Mohammed Fahim; Atiqullah Baryalai; Tommy Franks	Mullah Omar; Osama bin Laden; Mohammed Atef †

Units involved
Northern Alliance; ODA 555	(Afghanistan) Taliban (al-Qaeda) 055 Brigade

Kabul, capital of Afghanistan, fell in November 2001 to the Northern Alliance forces during the war in Afghanistan. Northern Alliance forces began their attack on the city on 13 November and made swift progress against Taliban and al-Qaeda forces that were heavily weakened by American and British air strikes. The advance moved ahead of plans, and the next day the Northern Alliance forces (supported by Operational Detachment Alpha 555 of the U.S. Army Special Forces) entered Kabul and met no resistance inside the city. Taliban forces retreated to Kandahar in the south.

Coupled with the fall of Mazar-i-Sharif five days earlier, the capture of Kabul was a significant blow to Taliban control of Afghanistan. As a result of all the losses, surviving members of the Taliban and al-Qaeda, including Osama bin Laden, retreated toward Kandahar, the spiritual birthplace and home of the Taliban movement, and Tora Bora.

== Background ==
By late 2001, the Taliban had seized control of approximately 90% of the country during the 1996–2001 Afghan Civil War, and following the al-Qaeda orchestrated assassination of Northern Alliance commander Ahmad Shah Massoud two days before the September 11 attacks, there were concerns the entire country would fall under Taliban control. Their fighters consisted of between 25,000 and 30,000 fighters, and were supported by other groups including between 2000 and 3000 Arab fighters in Osama bin Laden's 055 Brigade.

On 10 September, the Bush Administration agreed to a plan to oust the Taliban should they refuse to hand over Osama Bin Laden. Following the September 11 attacks, on 14 September, the United States demanded that the Taliban surrender all known al-Qaeda associates, provide intelligence on bin Laden and his affiliates, and expel all terrorists from Afghanistan.

On 7 October, after the Taliban refused to hand over bin Laden because of lack of evidence, the United States began their bombing campaign, and over the next month Northern Alliance forces, supported by US Special Forces and airstrikes, advanced across the country, capturing several key cities.

On 12 November, a brief battle took place on Shamali Plain between the Taliban and the Northern Alliance north of Kabul. For two years during the Afghan Civil War the frontline had been stalemated here, but with the Taliban demoralized by the fall of the northern cities, under constant attack by American air support, and fearing encirclement, they fell back to Kabul following just three hours of fighting, opening the road to the city. Following the battle, the Taliban forces in Kabul evacuated the city, emptying the national treasury but in their haste leaving behind weapons and other possessions.

== Fall of Kabul ==
Discussions had been held between the Northern Alliance and various foreign governments, including the United States, Britain, and Pakistan, about the possible seizure of Kabul, with US Secretary of State Colin Powell expressing that the foreign governments would prefer the alliance invest the city and not seize it, in order to improve the ability to form a broad and successful post-war government. The response to this pressure varied; some spokesmen agreed to this, while others suggested that they would push on to Kabul and on 12 November, as alliance forces neared the city, the British Prime Minister Tony Blair expressed his expectation that alliance commanders would honour their commitment and not seize the city.

Initially, the alliance held back from the city, with security guards being seen holding back armour and truckloads of infantry, but this pause was short-lived, and the alliance proved unable or unwilling to prevent their forces from entering the city.

Meanwhile, as the Taliban's control over Kabul was deteriorating, a tip reached CIA headquarters about an al-Qaeda convoy in the city, carrying a possible "high-value target." A CIA-operated drone tracked the convoy in the upscale Kabul neighborhood of Wazir Akbar Khan. The target was Mohammed Atef, an Egyptian militant and a key figure in al-Qaeda. An airstrike was carried out, killing Atef and dealing a significant blow to al-Qaeda, as he had been one of the leading members of the organization and was seen as a likely successor to Osama bin Laden.

== Aftermath ==
With the fall of the city, there were some incidents of vengeance against the Taliban; the BBC's John Simpson reported hearing chants of "kill the Taliban" from the inhabitants of Kabul as he entered the city, with many Taliban fighters, particularly foreign fighters from the Arabian Peninsula and Pakistan, being lynched and left in ditches while others were beaten with rifles and fists after their capture.

The liberation from the Taliban also resulted in the practice of behaviours formerly prohibited; the "great Afghan passion" of kite flying, which the Taliban had tried to stamp out, was taken up again, music was played, and young men lined up at street barbers to cut off the beard the Taliban had forced them to wear – though most would choose to keep it.

The fall of the city to the alliance did bring concerns about the long-lasting stability in the country. The alliance primarily consisted of minority ethnic groups within Afghanistan; Uzbeks, Tajiks, and Hazaras, while the Taliban was dominated by the majority ethnic group, the Pashtuns, and it was feared that the seizure of the city would make it more difficult to form a broad and inclusive coalition that would bring stability to the nation, particularly if the Taliban position in the south did not collapse and they continued to fight on as a guerrilla force.

== See also ==
- Fall of Kabul (2021)
