= Battle of Tora Bora =

2001 battle between the United States-led coalition and al-Qaeda in Afghanistan

- Part of the United States invasion of Afghanistan and manhunt for Osama bin Laden
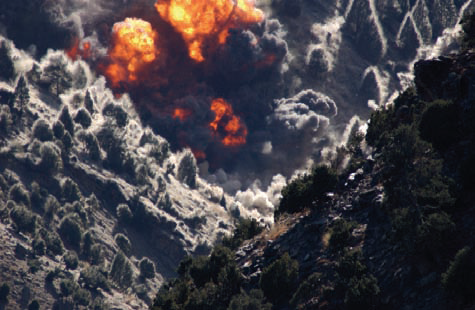
- U.S. air strikes on Tora Bora during the battle
Date	November 30 – December 17, 2001
Location	Pachir Wa Agam District, Nangarhar province, Afghanistan
Result	Partial coalition victory: Tora Bora stronghold destroyed; Osama bin Laden escapes; Beginning of the Taliban insurgency

Belligerents
Islamic State of Afghanistan; United States; United Kingdom; Germany	Al-Qaeda; Taliban; 055 Brigade; Turkistan Islamic Party; Tehreek-e-Nafaz-e-Shariat-e-Mohammadi

Commanders and leaders
Bismillah Khan; Hazrat Ali; Abdul Zahir Qadir; Mohammed Zaman; Tommy Franks; Tom Greer; Gary Berntsen; Michael Boyce; Reinhard Günzel	Osama bin Laden; Ayman al-Zawahiri; Abdul Latif Nasir (POW) (alleged); Hasan Mahsum; Sufi Muhammad

Strength
2,500 Afghan Eastern Shura fighters; 70 U.S. 1st SFOD-D members; 10 CIA SAD officers; 10 5th Special Forces Group members; 52 Special Boat Service members; 10 Secret Intelligence Service officers; Kommando Spezialkräfte; other coalition forces (aircraft)	~1,500–2,000

Casualties and losses
Afghan militias: Unknown; Coalition: None	220 killed, 60 captured

The Battle of Tora Bora occurred from 30 November to 17 December 2001, as part of the United States invasion of Afghanistan during the war in Afghanistan. It took place around the cave complex of Tora Bora in the Safed Koh mountain range, near Afghanistan's eastern border with Pakistan. In the battle, the U.S., British, German, and allied Afghan troops fought al-Qaeda; the Taliban, who controlled the country's government; and other Islamic extremists.

Led by Osama bin Laden, al-Qaeda conducted terrorist suicide attacks against the U.S. on September 11, 2001. The U.S. quickly launched a global "war on terror", which included a manhunt for bin Laden, and the invasion of Afghanistan, where the Taliban had allowed al-Qaeda to headquarter. The invasion began on October 7; the U.S. was supported by a multinational coalition.

On November 10, the CIA tracked bin Laden to Tora Bora. In the 1980s, the complex had been used by the Afghan mujahideen to repel the Soviet soldiers who were invading Afghanistan. Prior to 2001, bin Laden had been fortifying it for years. On November 30, the coalition began attacking the complex, with the objective to capture or kill bin Laden.

Bin Laden escaped Tora Bora, likely on December 15, and crossed the Pakistani border soon afterwards. The battle was the last time the U.S. knew his precise location until 2010, when they discovered his safe house in Abbottabad, Pakistan. The U.S. may have had a chance of killing bin Laden during the battle; near the start, CIA officer Gary Berntsen asked American general Tommy Franks to send a thousand Army Rangers into the complex to cut off bin Laden from crossing the border. Franks denied the request. The U.S. denied that bin Laden escaped Tora Bora during the battle until 2005.

With the coalition victory, the remaining Taliban openly active in Afghanistan were expelled. Their emirate had been toppled already with the fall of Kandahar on 7 December. The Taliban regrouped and formed an insurgency against the coalition-installed successor government and its international allies.

== Background ==
=== Osama bin Laden ===
In the Soviet–Afghan War (1979–1989), Muslim-majority Afghanistan was invaded by the mostly non-Muslim Soviet Union. Osama bin Laden, a Saudi Islamist connected to the royal House of Saud, left his country to organize the Afghan mujahideen, Muslims who fought the Soviets as jihadists; those who engage in jihad, Islamic religious struggle, are called mujahideen. For that purpose, bin Laden and Abdullah Yusuf Azzam founded Maktab al-Khidamat (MaK). MaK built up a large military force. As the United States was in conflict with the Soviets as part of the Cold War, CIA officers also assisted the mujahideen. In 1989, the Soviets withdrew from Afghanistan. Azzam was then assassinated, leaving Bin Laden with full control of MaK, which evolved into al-Qaeda. He then left Afghanistan, and moved to Sudan, but returned in 1996 after Sudan expelled him.

In the 1990s, the Taliban formed, and took control of most of the country, enforcing Islamic fundamentalist rule.

=== Tora Bora ===
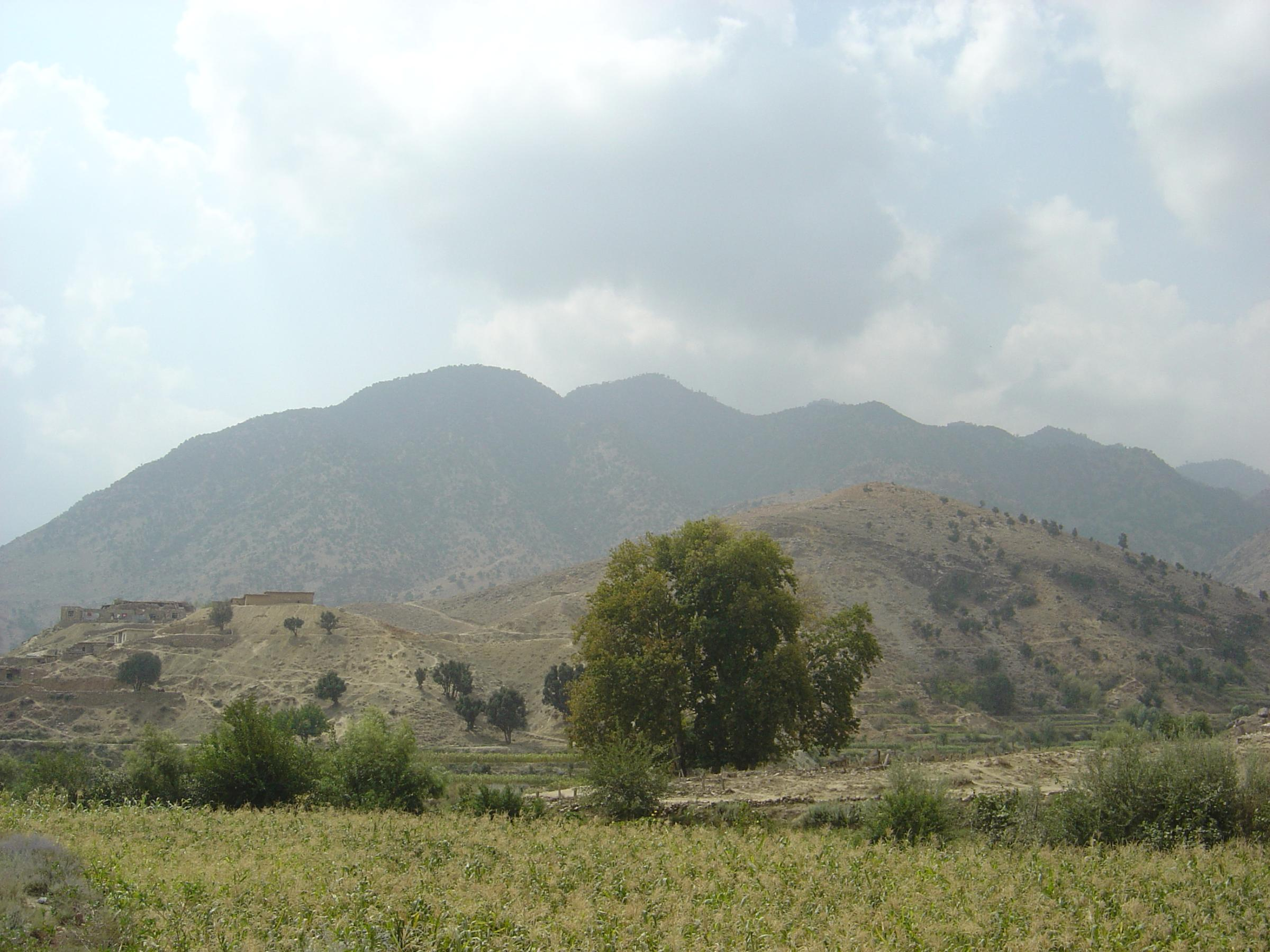
The mountains surrounding Tora Bora

During the Soviet–Afghan War, the CIA and bin Laden alike helped build cave complexes in the mountains of Afghanistan for the mujahideen to use as fortifications. Afghanistan's eastern Safed Koh range had one cave complex, Tora Bora. which was 20 miles away from the Pakistani border. In 2005, a mujahideen veteran, Masood Farivar, described how the caves were used during the war:

"They're rugged, formidable and isolated, If you know them, you can come and go with ease. But if you don't, they're a labyrinth that you can't penetrate. They rise in some places to 14,000 feet, and for 10 years the Soviets pummeled them with everything they had, but to absolutely no avail."

Upon his return to Afghanistan, bin Laden began expanding the complex, and building base camps at high elevations in the nearby mountains. He took the time to intimately familiarize himself with the local geography, committing it to memory while taking long hikes. He had an al-Qaeda training camp established there. He had combat experience in mountainous fortifications, as he commanded a mujahideen force to victory in that setting at the 1987 Battle of Jaji.

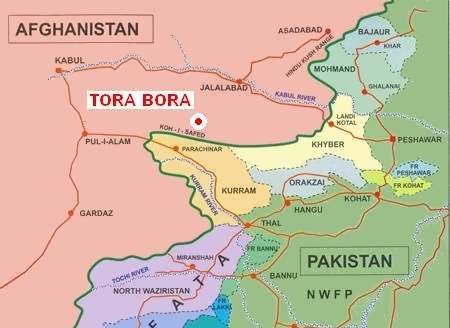
The complex's proximity to the Afghan-Pakistani border (dark green); depicted within Pakistan are the now-dissolved Federally Administered Tribal Areas (multicolored)

In the lead-up to the Battle of Tora Bora in 2001, the complex was described by the Western media as an impregnable cave fortress housing two thousand men, complete with: a hospital, a hydroelectric power plant, offices, a hotel, supply depots, roads large enough to drive a tank into, and elaborate tunnel and ventilation systems. The press published elaborate plans of the complex. When presented with such plans in an interview, U.S. Secretary of Defense Donald Rumsfeld said: "This is serious business, there's not one of those, there are many of those".

When Tora Bora was captured by the U.S.-led coalition in the battle, no traces of the supposed "fortress" were found, despite painstaking searches in the surrounding areas. Tora Bora turned out to be a system of small natural caves housing, at most, two hundred fighters. While supply depots were found, along with Soviet tanks that had been driven into some of the caves, there were no traces of the aforementioned advanced facilities.

A U.S. Special Forces staff sergeant who was in the battle later described the caves:

"[They] weren't these crazy mazes or labyrinths of caves that they described. Most of them were natural caves. Some were supported with some pieces of wood maybe about the size of a 10-foot by 24-foot room, at the largest. They weren't real big."

They described the military as being hesitant to enter the caves for some portion of the battle, due to the foreboding descriptions they had heard:

"I know they made a spectacle out of [the caves' sizes], and how are we going to be able to get into them? We worried about that too, because we see all these reports. Then it turns out, when you actually go up there, there's really just small bunkers, and a lot of different ammo storage is up there."

Journalist Matthew Forney, covering the battle on-location, was allowed access to see "rough bunkers" deep in the mountains:

"[I] saw a chamber of about eight square feet and high enough for a tall man to stand in. The floor was dirt and rubble, but there were signs of habitation. [...] Scattered on the floor [were] boxes of ammunition with Russian writing on them, and a canister about the size of an unexploded cluster bomb [...] Another cave next to it was about the same size and filled with ammunition, mostly bullets for Kalashnikovs and rocket-propelled grenades. Another nearby was much bigger and also filled with ammunition. Its cavern sloped up and back and seemed to lead to a passage, but nobody ventured in."

=== Invasion of Afghanistan ===
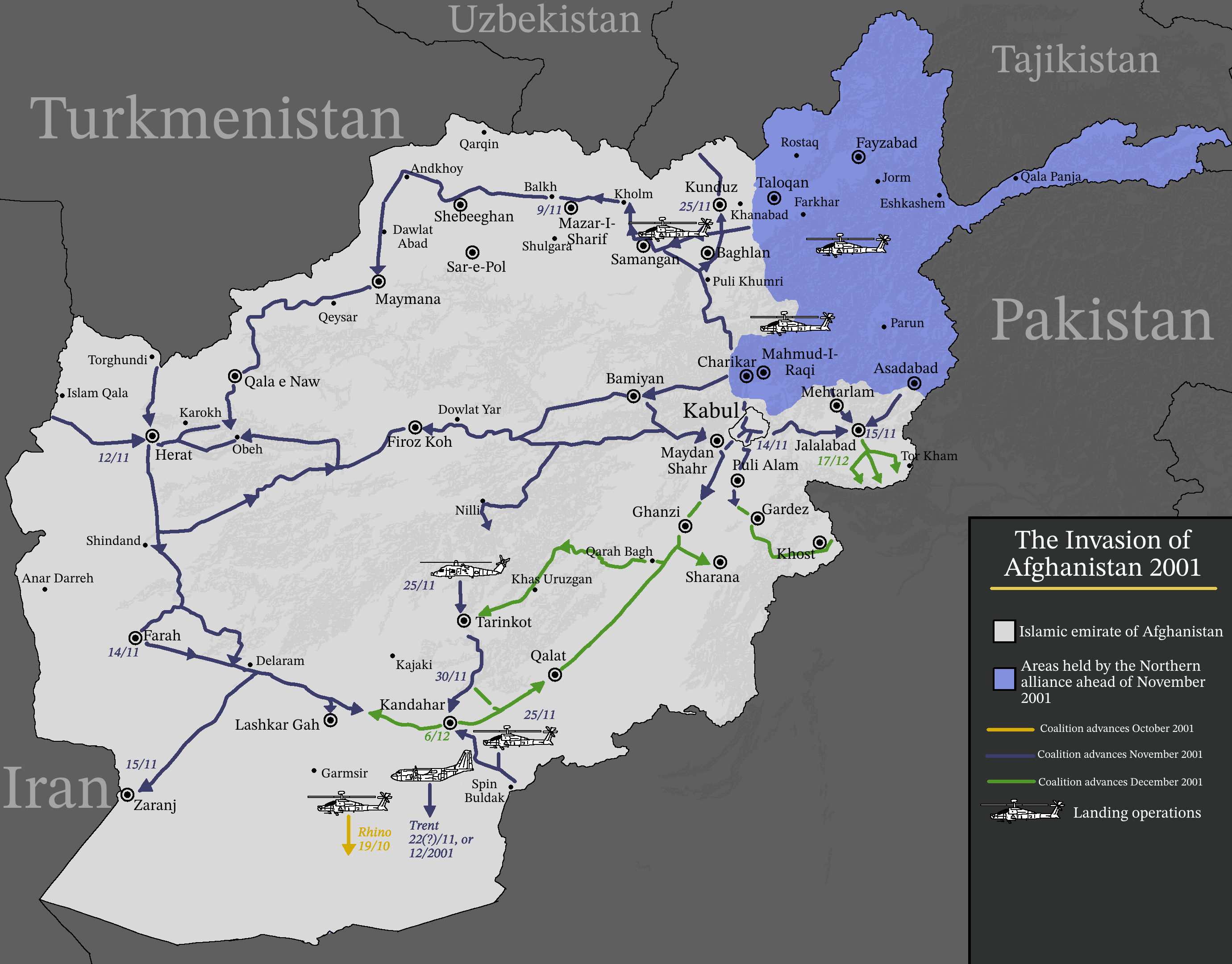
Movements in the 2001 invasion of Afghanistan

U.S. president George W. Bush and vice president Dick Cheney were inaugurated in January 2001. In the aftermath of the 11 September 2001 terrorist attacks, the U.S. launched Operation Enduring Freedom to dismantle the Taliban regime that had sheltered bin Laden. To achieve this goal, the U.S. military joined forces with the Northern Alliance, a group of rebels who had long been waging a guerrilla war against the Taliban.

Through a combination of air strikes and ground operations, the U.S. and its allies quickly gained the upper hand in the invasion, seizing control of key Taliban strongholds and toppling the regime's grip on power. By November 13, 2001, the Northern Alliance had captured the capital city of Kabul.

== Prelude ==
By November 2001, al-Qaeda fighters were still holding out in the mountains around Tora Bora. The CIA, meanwhile, was closely tracking bin Laden's movements in hopes to catch him. On 10 November, they spotted him near Jalalabad traveling in a convoy of two hundred pickup trucks. They then headed towards al-Qaeda's training camp at Tora Bora. The U.S. had expected him to make a last stand at the complex, believing he might have wanted a repeat of his victory at Battle of Jaji. On 29 November, Dick Cheney revealed that bin Laden was believed to be in the general area of Tora Bora, surrounded by a sizable force of loyal fighters.

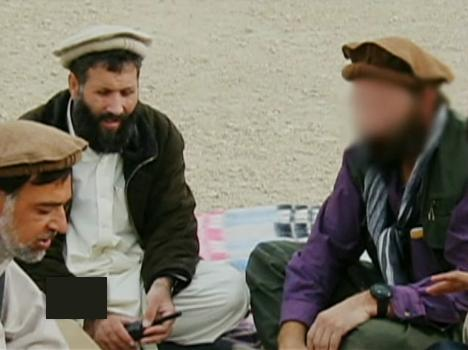
A CIA deputy (right) meeting with Afghan mercenaries at Tora Bora

The lead CIA officer in the Panjshir Valley, Gary Berntsen, sent a detachment to team up with Afghan tribal militias around Jalalabad who opposed the Taliban. The Americans climbed the mountains guided by the locals who knew the terrain. After a few days of climbing, they arrived at bin Laden's training camp, where hundreds of al-Qaeda fighters could be spotted.

Twelve British SBS commandos, and one British Royal Signals Specialist from 63 Signals squadron accompanied the U.S. special operations forces in attacking the complex at Tora Bora. Special Forces Operators of the German KSK took part as well; they were reportedly responsible for protecting the flanks in the mountains and conducting reconnaissance missions.

== Battle ==
On 30 November 2001, a coalition of U.S. Special Forces, Joint Special Operations Command (JSOC) soldiers, and a detachment of CIA operatives (codenamed "Jawbreaker") led by Berntsen, joined forces with Afghan tribal militias, and began to call in airstrikes on the al-Qaeda training camp.

CIA intelligence had indicated that bin Laden and the al-Qaeda leadership were trapped in the caves early in the battle, and on 1 December, Berntsen requested General Tommy Franks to send less than a thousand U.S. Army Rangers to block off the mountain passes into Pakistan and cut off bin Laden's escape. However, Franks denied the request, as he agreed with the Bush administration that Pakistan would capture bin Laden if he tried to cross the border. Berntsen and former CIA agent Gary Schroen later claimed that not deploying the Rangers had allowed bin Laden to escape. Bernstein also blamed the American military's reliance on Afghan militias. Journalist Peter Bergen later reconstructed the U.S. troop placements at Tora Bora, and claimed that Franks' refusal to deploy was "one of the greatest military blunders in recent U.S. history". Historian Carter Malkasian, who advised American commanders in Afghanistan, has argued that bin Laden always had a good chance of escaping the caves, and that the Rangers would not have been able to completely seal off the mountain range.

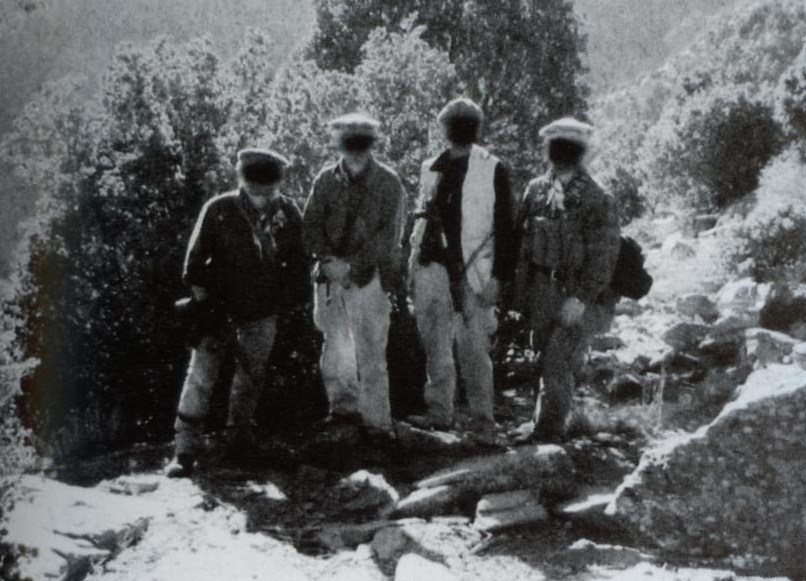
The first U.S. team to enter the complex

On 3 December, Hazrat Ali, one of the Afghan commanders, announced that the push to capture the mountain stronghold would begin. However, Ali's failure to properly communicate the plan of attack to the other commanders resulted in many fighters being ill-prepared at the outset of the offensive. On 5 December, the Afghan fighters wrested control of the low ground below the mountain caves from the al-Qaeda fighters. The Jawbreaker team and Special Forces teams equipped with laser designators called in Air Force bombers to take out targets; non-stop heavy air strikes including laser-guided bombs and missiles lasted for 72 hours.

The tribal militias that the U.S. coalition was coordinating with lacked the motivation to engage in the fight wholeheartedly. To them, al-Qaeda was a group of fellow Muslims, and with the battle taking place during the Islamic holy month of Ramadan, the fighters would retire every evening to break their fast and spend time with their families off the mountain. Moreover, the two Afghan commanders, Ali and Mohammed Zaman, had a strong dislike and mutual distrust of each other. As a result, their factions often shot at each other instead of focusing on fighting al-Qaeda. The animosity between the leaders and their respective militias was not a favorable sign for a successful outcome against a determined and cohesive enemy.

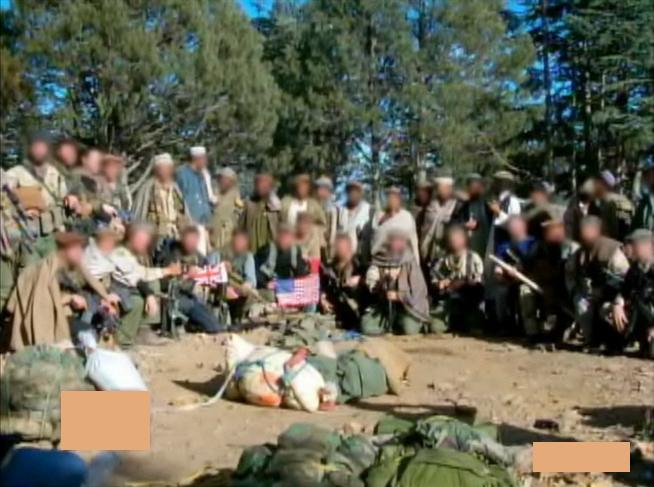
American and British special forces disguised in traditional Afghan clothing in Tora Bora

The al-Qaeda fighters withdrew to higher fortified positions and dug in for the battle. On 8 December, a team of elite Delta Force soldiers led by Major Tom Greer (also known as Dalton Fury) arrived. They had put on traditional clothing and grown thick beards to blend in with the Afghan militias, and were carrying the same types of weapons as them.

The Americans were able to pick up a radio from a dead al-Qaeda fighter. This allowed the U.S. forces to eavesdrop on the al-Qaeda fighter's communications, including bin Laden himself. Greer has said that there was "no doubt" that it was bin Laden's voice on the other end of that radio, citing a CIA operative named "Jalal", who had spent seven years studying bin Laden's voice, confirming it.

Two British SBS Commandos from M Sqn were embedded with A Sqn Delta, one of whom continued to work for JSOC, albeit in a different capacity. During the hours of darkness, the al-Qaeda fighters would light fires, which would reveal their specific location and aid laser-designated targeting for air-launched weapons.

The Afghan fighters continued a steady advance through the difficult terrain, backed by airstrikes and U.S. and U.K. Special Forces.

The U.S. bombed the bunker that bin Laden was believed to be hiding in on 9 December; however, he had already evacuated the bunker on the previous day. Peter Bergen writes that bin Laden had a premonition of danger when he dreamed of a scorpion crawling into one of the trenches his men had dug for him.

On 10 December, Delta Force intercepted radio communications indicating that bin Laden was on the move, attempting to break through the siege line. Later that day, Afghan soldiers claimed they had spotted bin Laden and had him surrounded. In the evening, more communications revealed bin Laden's location just 10 kilometers away. However, Delta Force could not act on this opportunity due to being engaged in a fierce firefight with other al-Qaeda fighters, and their Afghan allies leaving to break their fast for Ramadan. Thomas Greer later expressed deep regret for the failure to capitalize on this opportunity, feeling that he had let down his country in its time of need.

On 12 December, al-Qaeda forces, facing defeat, negotiated a ceasefire with a local Afghan militia commander to give them time to surrender their weapons. In retrospect, however, some critics believe that the truce was a device to allow important al-Qaeda figures, including bin Laden, to escape.

Berntsen was furious when he heard the news of the ceasefire. He did not trust the al-Qaeda fighters and was suspicious of their intentions in surrendering. He screamed into a phone: "No ceasefire! No negotiation! We continue airstrikes!". Greer has claimed that the Americans only half-heartedly honored the truce, even bombing al-Qaeda positions at 5 a.m.—a full three hours before it was set to expire. One American pilot protested the proposed surrender by drawing a giant "8" in the sky, followed by the word "ON".

On 13 December, the fighting flared again, possibly initiated by a rear guard buying time for the main force's escape through the Safed Koh into the tribal areas of Pakistan. Tribal forces backed by U.S. special operations troops and air support pressed ahead against fortified al-Qaeda positions in caves and bunkers scattered throughout the mountainous region.

The U.S. focus increased on the complex. Local tribal militias, paid and organized by Special Forces and CIA SAD paramilitary, numbering over 2,000 strong, continued to mass for an attack as the heavy bombing continued on suspected al-Qaeda positions. However, progress was very slow due to the Afghans retreating every night to break their fast, leaving only a small number of U.S. special forces to fend for themselves, and allowing al-Qaeda to regain all the terrain that they had lost during the day. On 14 December, the Americans finally convinced Ali to keep his men in position and continue advancing even after dark. However, too much time had already been wasted, allowing most of al-Qaeda's leadership to escape into Pakistan.

=== Osama bin Laden's escape ===
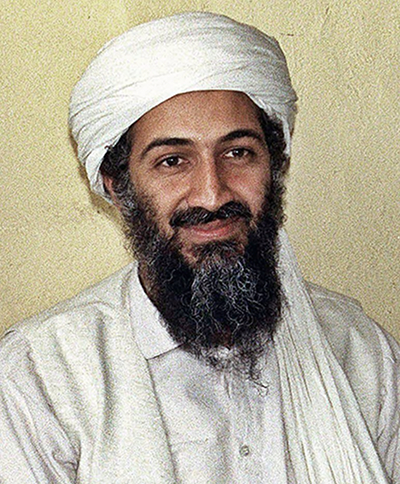
Osama bin Laden

Bin Laden is conventionally believed to have escaped Tora Bora on 15 December. As the situation became increasingly precarious due to continued U.S. bombardment and with the al-Qaeda fighters running low on food supplies, two groups of al-Qaeda fighters descended the southern slopes toward Pakistan. They bribed local tribes in the area to elude Pakistani blocking forces. Carter Malkasian wrote that bin Laden may have escaped with one of these two groups.

Peter Bergen writes that bin Laden had already escaped towards Jalalabad on 12 December, during the truce that had been negotiated that day. Bergen says that bin Laden took advantage of the truce that night and used the cover of the darkness to sneak out of the mountain range and make his way to the house of an ally in Jalalabad, where he spent the night. The next day, he rode north on horseback to the heavily forested mountains of Kunar, where he disappeared into a place so remote and obscure that it did not appear on any maps.

Another theory presented by Sean Naylor involves outside assistance. He writes that a Delta operator had observed multiple Mi-17 helicopters, which are used by the Pakistani armed forces, flying near the border. The helicopters seemed to be making a quick landing in Afghanistan and then immediately returning to Pakistan. This observation led some Delta members to speculate that Pakistan might have been transporting bin Laden to safety.

...a severe and fierce bombardment began...not one second passed without warplanes hovering over our heads...[America] exhausted all efforts to blow up and annihilate this tiny spot – wiping it out altogether...Despite all this, we blocked their daily attacks, sending them back defeated, bearing their dead and wounded. And not once did American forces dare storm our position, what clearer proof of their cowardice, fear, and lies concerning the myth of their alleged power is there?!

— Bin Laden, 2002

Greer later wrote that bin Laden escaped into Pakistan on or around 16 December. He gives three reasons for why he believes bin Laden was able to escape: (1) the U.S. mistakenly thought that Pakistan was effectively guarding the border area, (2) the U.S.' allies refused to allow the use of air-dropped GATOR mines, which might have kept bin Laden and his forces inside the complex, and (3) over-reliance on native Afghan military forces as the main force deployed against bin Laden and his fighters. Greer theorized that because the battle took place during Ramadan, the Afghan forces would leave the battlefield in the evenings to break fast, thus giving al-Qaeda a chance to regroup, reposition, or escape.

The failure to capture bin Laden meant that the U.S. had squandered its best opportunity to capture him at the start of the war on terror.

=== End of the battle ===
By 17 December, the last cave in the complex had been taken and their defenders overrun. Some of the most brutal fighting of the battle took place during these last couple of days, as the most dedicated al-Qaeda fighters remained in the caves to cover the retreat of their leadership. The roughly sixty captured al-Qaeda prisoners were put on display for international media; as they appeared to be fatigued and thin, they were far from their popular image as formidable warriors. U.S. forces continued searching the area into January 2002, but did not find any signs of bin Laden or the al-Qaeda leadership. Berntsen led the CIA team tasked with locating bin Laden. He said that al-Qaeda detainees had reported that bin Laden escaped into Pakistan via an easterly route to Parachinar. Berntsen believed that bin Laden could have been captured during the battle if the U.S. military had committed more troops early in the battle.

=== Guantanamo prisoners' accounts ===
U.S. authorities have justified the continued detention of several dozen Afghan Guantanamo prisoners on suspicion that they had participated in the battle, or helped bin Laden to escape.

In September 2007, Ayman Saeed Abdullah Batarfi, a Yemeni doctor held as an enemy combatant by the U.S., was reported to have described the conditions during the battle:

"Most of all the total guns in the Tora Bora area was 16 Kalashnikovs and there are 200 people." He also said: "He [bin Laden] came for a day to visit the area and we talked to him and we wanted to leave this area. He said he didn't know where to go himself and the second day he escaped and was gone."

== Aftermath ==
After failing to capture bin Laden, the Bush administration initially denied any evidence of his presence in the battle. Donald Rumsfeld argued that the threat posed by Islamist extremism went beyond one individual, and there was no certainty about bin Laden's presence. Dick Cheney avoided addressing the matter entirely, choosing to never mention or talk about the battle's occurrence.

On 7 January 2002, Tommy Franks stated that bin Laden had been at Tora Bora. However, he retracted his claim in 2004:

"We don't know to this day whether Mr. bin Laden was at Tora [Bora]. Some intelligence sources said he was; others indicated he was in Pakistan at the time [...] Tora Bora was teeming with Taliban and al-Qaeda operatives [...] but [he] was never within our grasp."

According to Franks' deputy at CENTCOM during the war, Lieutenant General Michael Delong, officials in Washington were well aware of bin Laden's presence at Tora Bora during the battle. Delong later wrote:

We were hot on Osama bin Laden’s trail. He was definitely there when we hit [the Tora Bora] caves. Every day during the bombing, Rumsfeld asked me, ‘Did we get him? Did we get him?’

During the 2004 presidential election, the question of whether bin Laden was present at Tora Bora became a highly debated issue. John Kerry, Bush's main opponent, criticized the Bush administration for failing to capture bin Laden, despite having him cornered, and with the world's most powerful military at their disposal. This criticism challenged the Bush campaign's claim that Bush was tough on terrorism, and Cheney vehemently dismissed Kerry's critique as "absolute garbage".

In the spring of 2005, the Pentagon released a document that admitted they believed that bin Laden had indeed escaped at Tora Bora. This was the first time such information had been made public.

Many enemy fighters fled through the rough terrain and into the tribal areas of Pakistan to the south and east. Allied forces estimated that around two hundred of the al-Qaeda fighters were killed during the battle, along with an unknown number of anti-Taliban tribal fighters. No coalition deaths were reported. Bin Laden would not be seen until 2004, when a video of him was broadcast by Al Jazeera.

In 2009, the U.S. Senate Committee on Foreign Relations led an investigation into the battle. They concluded that Rumsfeld and Franks had not committed enough troops during the battle to secure the area around Tora Bora. They believed that bin Laden had likely been at Tora Bora, and his escape prolonged the war in Afghanistan.

In 2009, a U.S. Senate report concluded that the failure to capture bin Laden "[laid] the foundation for today's protracted Afghan insurgency and inflaming the internal strife now endangering Pakistan." Following the battle, U.K. and U.S. forces and their Afghan allies consolidated their position in the country. The Taliban and al-Qaeda forces did not give up, and went into hiding.

Bergen has stated that the U.S. failure to capture bin Laden gave motivation to the Taliban. The latter regrouped into the Taliban insurgency, and found success after U.S. officials diverted its forces for the 2003 invasion of Iraq and subsequent Iraq War. Al-Qaeda forces began regrouping in Paktia Province in January and February 2002.

A Loya jirga or grand council of major Afghan factions, tribal leaders, and former exiles, an interim Afghan government, was established in Kabul under Hamid Karzai. Mullah Saifur Rehman, a Taliban fugitive in Paktia province, began rebuilding some of his militia forces in support of the anti-U.S. fighters. They totaled over 1,000 by the beginning of Operation Anaconda in March 2002. The insurgents planned to use the region as a base for launching guerrilla attacks and possibly a major offensive in the style of the mujahideen during the 1980s.

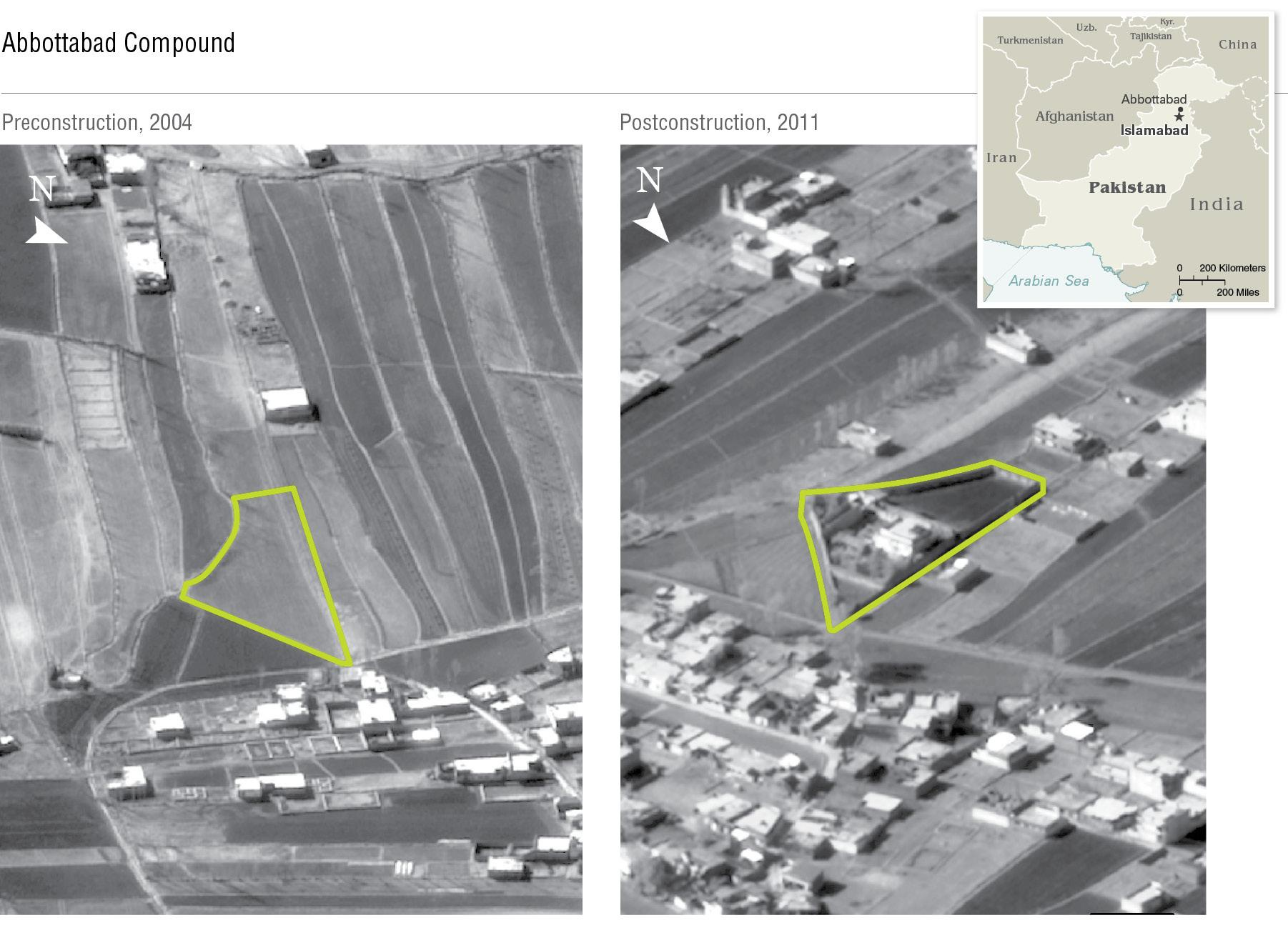
The plot of Bin Laden's safe house in Abottabad, Pakistan, before and after it was built

U.S. intelligence agencies continued to track bin Laden. In August 2010, they found evidence that bin Laden was living in a safe house in Abbottabad, Pakistan. On 2 May 2011, the U.S. announced that U.S. Navy SEALs had killed bin Laden at a raid of his safe house.

=== Greer statement ===
In 2008, Greer said that his Delta Force team and CIA paramilitary officers traveled to Tora Bora after the CIA had identified bin Laden's location. Greer's team proposed an operation to attack bin Laden's suspected position from the rear, over the 14,000 foot-high mountain separating Tora Bora from Pakistan. He said unidentified officials at higher headquarters rejected his proposal. Greer suggested dropping GATOR mines in the passes leading away from Tora Bora, but this was also denied. Greer and his team approached the suspected position from the front and were within 2,000 meters, but withdrew because of uncertainty over the number of al-Qaeda fighters and a lack of support from allied Afghan troops.

Greer said his team planned to advance again on the al-Qaeda forces, but after the ceasefire, Afghan soldiers drew their weapons on the U.S. soldiers. After twelve hours of negotiations, the Afghans stood down, but bin Laden and his bodyguards had left. Greer reports that his team intercepted and interpreted radio calls by bin Laden in the afternoon of 13 December 2001. He said to his fighters, "the time is now, arm your women and children against the infidel." After a few hours of bombing, bin Laden broke his silence again, saying: "Our prayers were not answered. Times are dire and bad. We did not get support from the apostate nations who call themselves our Muslim brothers. Things might have been different." Greer said that bin Laden's final words to his fighters that night were: "I'm sorry for getting you involved in this battle, if you can no longer resist, you may surrender with my blessing."

Greer said that his team saw a group, whom they believed to be bin Laden and his bodyguards, entering a cave. The team called down several bombing attacks on the site, and believed that they had killed bin Laden. Six months later, U.S. and Canadian forces returned and checked several caves in the area, finding remains of al-Qaeda fighters, but not of bin Laden. Greer thought that bin Laden was injured during the bombing of the cave, but was hidden, given medical care, and assisted out of the area into Pakistan by allied local Afghans.

== See also ==
- War in Afghanistan (1978–present)
- CIA's Special Activities Division
