= Ezatullah (Nangarhar) =

Ezatullah was an Afghan military commander. A local leader of an anti-Taliban militia, from Sorubi, he set up a provisional government in Nangarhar Province on November 16, 2001, after the Taliban retreated.

The two other leaders in the provisional government were Hazrati Ali from Towr Kham and Malawi Yunis Khalis from the provincial capital, Jalalabad. The provisional government was part of the Eastern Shura.
