= Surobi =

Surobi (Pashto: سروبي) may refer to:

- Surobi, Kabul, a town and district centre in Kabul Province, Afghanistan
  - Surobi District, Kabul, a district in Kabul Province, Afghanistan
- Surobi, Nangarhar, a community in Nangarhar Province, Afghanistan
- Surobi District, Paktika, a district in Paktika Province, Afghanistan
  - Surobi, Paktika, a district center in Paktika Province, Afghanistan
- Zarobi, a village of Swabi District, Khyber Pakhtunkhwa
