= Awal Gul =

Afghan Guantanamo detainee (1962–2011)

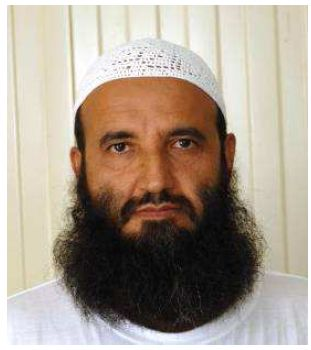
- Born: July 1, 1962; Laghman Province, Afghanistan
- Arrested: December 26, 2001; Militia leader Hazrat Ali
- Died: February 2, 2011 (aged 48); Guantanamo Bay detention camp
- Detained at: Guantanamo
- Other names: Awal Malim Gul; Moalim Awal Gul
- ISN: 782
- Charge: No charge

Awal Gul (July 1, 1962 – February 2, 2011) was a citizen of Afghanistan who died in extrajudicial detention in the United States Guantanamo Bay detention camps in Cuba after nine years of imprisonment without charge.

== Personal ==
The Department of Defense reports Awal Gul was born on July 1, 1962. Sawati Ghundi, Afghanistan. He was the father of 18 children.

== Relationship with the Taliban ==
"While the U.S. claims he was a Taliban commander, Gul has long insisted that he quit the Taliban a year before the 9/11 attack because, as his lawyer put it, 'he was disgusted by the Taliban's growing penchant for corruption and abuse.'" USA Today reported that Gul "had played a key role in persuading Taliban commanders to surrender Nangarhar Province to a council of tribal leaders." His attorneys wrote in a letter after Gul's death:

The government charged that he was a prominent member of the Taliban and its military, but we proved that this is false. Indeed, we have documents from Afghanistan, even a letter from Mullah Omar himself on Taliban letterhead, discussing Mr. Gul's efforts to resign from the Taliban a year or more before 9/11/01. ... Mr. Gul was never an enemy of the United States in any way. ... We now hear for the very first time in the nearly 10 years since Mr. Gul's arrest, that (1) he operated a guesthouse for Al-Qaida members, and (2) that he admitted providing bin Laden operational support on several occasions. Over the course of almost 3 years in court, the government has never provided any evidence at all to support this slander. Neither Mr. Gul nor any credible witness has ever said such things. Indeed, this is why the government placed Mr. Gul in the group of prisoners set for "indefinite detention;" it admitted that it lacked any credible evidence to prove its suspicions in a court of law. The government never even made these claims until now, when Mr. Gul is not alive to defend himself.

Beginning in the early 1980s, Mr. Gul was a member of local forces who were allied with the United States against the Soviets. From 1989–1996, he continued to run the local weapons depot in his hometown, not unlike a police commander, which he used to keep the peace. In 1996, the Taliban swept through eastern Afghanistan and took over his city at the barrel of a gun. Mr. Gul was given two options: flee with your family to Pakistan or stay home and operate the depot at the command of the Taliban. It must be remembered that the Taliban was initially greeted warmly by many Afghans, and even the American government, as a source of hope. Mr. Gul stayed home. The Taliban soon proved themselves to be as corrupt and abusive as we can imagine. Mr. Gul discovered this change over time and resigned from the Taliban more than one year before September 11, 2001. He was arrested in December 2001 when he voluntarily traveled to meet American military officials.

Phillip Smucker, writing in The Asia Times, described being contacted by W. Matthew Dodge, a lawyer defending Gul before a Guantanamo military commission. According to Smucker, the prosecution's charges depended on a new alternate theory as to how Osama bin Laden escaped from Tora Bora. The new theory is that bin Laden didn't escape through collusion with corrupt Eastern Shura officials across the border to Pakistan's Tribal Areas—but rather through Awal Gul's help north to Konar province.

The Taliban had demanded Gul's release in exchange for Army prisoner of war Bowe Bergdahl, who was captured on June 30, 2009. Bergdahl was released in exchange for five other Taliban members held at Guantanamo on May 31, 2014.

== Guantanamo ==
Gul is one of the Guantanamo detainees whose medical records, and arrival date, were not made public.

=== Combatant Status Review ===
Gul was among the 60% of prisoners who chose to participate in tribunal hearings. A Summary of Evidence memo was prepared for the tribunal of each detainee.

Gul's memo accused him of the following:

a. Detainee is a member of the Taliban and associated with al Qaida.
1. Detainee was trained in the use of Stinger missiles in Pakistan
2. Detainee associated with Usama Bin Laden on three occasions.
3. Detainee served intermittently as commander of a Taliban supply base near Jalalabad, Afghanistan, for ten years.

b. Detainee engaged in hostilities against the U.S. or its coalition partners.
1. Detainee fought against the Northern Alliance in Kabul on the Gul-Da-Da-Ra front lines and was the commander of a ten-man unit.
2. Detainee was the commander of "Taliban Unit Four," a 250-soldier unit, for approximately five years.

=== Testimony ===
Gul told his Tribunal he thought he surrendered on February 10, 2002. However press reports his capture on December 25, 2001.

=== Administrative Review Board ===
Detainees whose Combatant Status Review Tribunal labeled them "enemy combatants" were scheduled for annual Administrative Review Board hearings. These hearings were designed to assess the threat a detainee might pose if released or transferred, and whether there were other factors that warranted his continued detention.

A Summary of Evidence memo was prepared for Awal Gul's first annual Administrative Review Board in 2005. The two page memo listed nine "primary factors favor[ing] continued detention" and two "primary factors favor[ing] release or transfer".

A Summary of Evidence memo was prepared for Awal Gul's second annual Administrative Review Board in 2006. The two page memo listed eleven "primary factors favor[ing] continued detention" and five "primary factors favor[ing] release or transfer".

A Summary of Evidence memo was prepared for Awal Gul's third annual Administrative Review Board in 2007. The four page memo listed twenty-four "primary factors favor[ing] continued detention" and thirteen "primary factors favor[ing] release or transfer".

=== Military Commissions Act ===
The Military Commissions Act of 2006 mandated that Guantanamo captives were no longer entitled to access the US civil justice system, so all outstanding habeas corpus petitions were stayed.

=== Boumediene v. Bush ===
On June 12, 2008, the United States Supreme Court ruled, in Boumediene v. Bush, that the Military Commissions Act could not remove the right for Guantanamo captives to access the US Federal Court system, and that all previous Guantanamo captives' habeas petitions were eligible to be re-instated. The judges considering the captives' habeas petitions would be considering whether the evidence used to compile the allegations the men and boys were enemy combatants justified a classification of "enemy combatant".

=== Writ of habeas corpus ===
Gul had a habeas corpus petition filed on his behalf. On December 30, 2008, United States Department of Justice official Daniel M. Barish informed the court that the DoJ had filed "factual returns" in seven habeas cases, including Gul's. The petition was fully argued before a federal court in March 2010, eleven months before his death. No further action was taken. The action was still pending when he died.

== Death ==
Media reports indicate he died after collapsing in the shower following a workout on an elliptical machine. An autopsy completed February 3, 2011, indicated a heart attack or a pulmonary embolism was the possible cause. His attorneys have maintained that "we have no way of knowing whether the government is telling us the truth" about Gul's death. They further wrote: "It is shame that the government will finally fly him home not in handcuffs and a hood, but in a casket. ... Justice will now come too late for Mr. Gul."

5,000 attended the funeral on February 7, 2011. They ran alongside a vehicle carrying the body. Gul's body was wrapped in white cloth, but his face and beard were visible inside the coffin, which was buried in Jalalabad, east of Kabul.
