= Haji Abdul Qadeer =

Northern Alliance leader in Afghanistan (c.1951–2002)

Hajji Abdul Qadeer
- عبدالقدیر
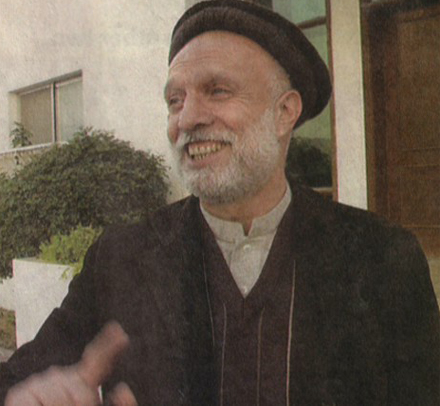
- Qadeer in 2002

Vice President of Afghanistan
- In office 19 June 2002 – 6 July 2002
- President: Hamid Karzai

Personal details
- Born: 1951 Jalalabad, Kingdom of Afghanistan
- Died: 6 July 2002 (aged 50–51) Kabul, Islamic State of Afghanistan
- Other political affiliations: Hezb-i Islami Khalis
- Relations: Din Mohammad (brother); Abdul Haq (brother); Zahir Qadeer (son)
- Occupation: Mujahideen leader

Military service
- Allegiance: Pakistan
- Battles/wars: Soviet–Afghan War; Afghan Civil War (1996–2001)

Hajji Abdul Qadeer (Pashto: حاجی عبدالقدیر; c. 1951 – 6 July 2002) was an Afghan politician and prominent Northern Alliance leader who fought the Taliban during the Third Afghan Civil War. Originally a commander of the Hezb-i Islami Khalis faction during the Soviet–Afghan War, he then served as governor of Nangarhar Province, the head of the Eastern Afghanistan Shura, and later Vice President of Afghanistan and Minister of Public Works in the administration of Hamid Karzai from 19 June 2002 until his assassination on 6 July 2002. He was the older brother of fellow anti-Soviet and Northern Alliance commander Abdul Haq, who was assassinated in late 2001 by the Taliban.

== Early life ==
Abdul Qadeer was born in 1951 in Jalalabad, Nangarhar Province. He belonged to the influential Pashtun Arsala family from Nangarhar province of Afghanistan. He was involved in Afghan politics even before the Soviet invasion of Afghanistan in 1979. When the Soviets invaded Afghanistan, Qadeer fought against them as a key resistance commander with the Hezb-e Islami Khalis faction. After the Soviet retreat in 1989 and the fall of the Afghan communist regime in 1992, Qadeer was appointed governor of Nangarhar province in eastern Afghanistan.

On 27 September 1996, the Taliban took power in Kabul with military support by Pakistan and financial support by Saudi Arabia. Qadeer had to flee from Nangarhar and entered neighbouring Pakistan. Because of his opposition to the Taliban (unlike Yunus Khalis), however, he soon faced trouble with the authorities in Pakistan. Qadir then left for Germany. In the following years he shuttled between Germany and Dubai where he had started a trading business.

In 1999, Qadeer returned to Afghanistan and joined the Northern Alliance (United Front), which was the only resistance force left against the Taliban regime and its allies. The United Front included forces and leaders from different political backgrounds as well as from all Afghan ethnicities including Pashtuns, Tajiks, Uzbeks, Hazaras and Turkmens. Qadeer came to lead the United Front's Eastern Shura and ensured the alliance's influence in the largely Pashtun east of Afghanistan.

From the Taliban conquest in 1996 until November 2001 the United Front controlled roughly 30% of Afghanistan's population in provinces such as Badakhshan, Kapisa, Takhar and parts of Parwan, Kunar, Nuristan, Laghman, Samangan, Kunduz, Ghōr and Bamyan. Ahmad Shah Massoud did not intend for the United Front to become the ruling government of Afghanistan. His vision was for the United Front to help establish a new government, where the various ethnic groups would share power and live in peace through a democratic form of government.

Qadeer's younger brother Abdul Haq, a famous anti-Soviet resistance fighter, was executed by Taliban Interior Minister Mulla Abdul Razaq from Zhob Pakistan, (captain Imam's student). Taliban agents on October 26, 2001 when trying to rally anti-Taliban support among the Pashtuns as part of the US-led effort against the Taliban after 9/11.

After the fall of the Taliban regime, Abdul Qadeer joined with two other leaders, Hazrat Ali and Haji Mohammed Zaman, to lead the Eastern Shura. After the 2001 Bonn Conference on Afghanistan, Afghan interim president Hamid Karzai nominated Qadeer to be one of the Vice Presidents of Afghanistan, and Minister of Public Works.

Abdul Qadeer was alleged to have had connections with those engaged in Afghanistan's opium poppy trade.

== Death ==
On 6 July 2002, Qadeer and his son-in-law were killed by gunmen. In 2004, one man was sentenced to death and two others to prison sentences for the assassination.

== Personal life ==
Qadeer belonged to the very influential Pashtun Arsala family from the east of Afghanistan. His brother was the anti-Soviet commander of Kabul Front Abdul Haq who was executed in late 2001 by the Taliban. The Arsala family is based in the Afghan province of Nangarhar. The capital of Nangarhar is Jalalabad. He had very strong ties with the late Afghan King, Zaher Shah. The Afghans, in particular the people of Nangarhar, refer to him as the "Warrior of Afghanistan". He is known to have accomplished many things in the time of his power, especially in Nangarhar where he governed.

Abdul Qadeer's son Zahir Qadir, a former military commander in the Afghan National Army, served as the deputy speaker of the Afghan House of the People.

== See also ==
- Afridi (Pashtun)
- Abdul Haq
- Ahmad Shah Massoud
- Zahir Shah

Political offices
| Preceded by ? | Governor of Nangarhar Province, Afghanistan (? prior to Taliban period), again 2001–2002 | Succeeded by Haji Din Mohammad |
