= Hazrat Ali =

Hazrat Ali may refer to:

- Ali (600 or 601 or 607 – 661), son-in-law of Muhammad
- Hazrat Ali (Afghan politician) (born 1964)
