= Gulan =

- Other name: Sher Gulan
- Known for: led contingents of anti-Taliban forces during the overthrow of the Taliban

Gulan (alternatively Sher Gulan) was an anti-Taliban militia leader, prior to the ouster of the Taliban. He was a member of a local anti-Taliban provisional administration that rose to power in Eastern Afghanistan, centred in Jalalabad, Nangarhar, before Hamid Karzai had assembled his nationwide provisional administration.

According to The Washington Post Gulan lead one of the pincer movements in December 2001 that unsuccessfully tried to capture Osama bin Laden, and prevent his escape from Tora Bora to Pakistan.

Guantanamo detainee Anwar Khan, reports handing in his weapons, and his brother's weapon to Gulan when his brother was killed fighting the Taliban in Tora Bora, and he chose to retire from the fighting. Khan told his Administrative Review Board that he and Gulan were under the command of Hazrat Ali, one of the militia commanders who nominated Hamid Karzai for the Presidency of the interim Afghan administration.

== See also ==
- Eastern Shura
