= Zahir Qadeer =

Afghan politician and general

Zahir Qadeer ظاهر قدیر
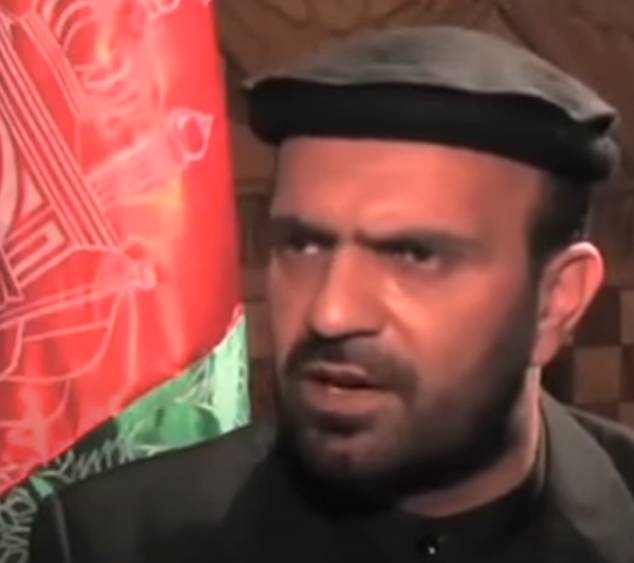
- Qadeer in 2015

Member of the House of the People
- In office 2010–2021
- Parliamentary group: Karwan-e-Solh ("Peace Caravan"); Parliamentary Alliance for the Support of the Law

Personal details
- Born: 1973 (age 52–53) Nangarhar Province, Afghanistan
- Party: Independent
- Relatives: Haji Abdul Qadeer (father)
- Occupation: Politician

Military service
- Allegiance: Islamic Republic of Afghanistan
- Branch/service: Afghan Border Police
- Rank: General

Haji Abdul Zahir Qadeer (Pashto: حاجی عبدالظاهر قدیر) is an Afghan politician and former member of the National Assembly. He was previously a General in Afghanistan's Border Guard, serving as 8th Border Battalion Commander, Takhar Province. In 2010 he was elected to the House of the People as the member for Nangarhar, and was elected First Deputy Speaker in 2012.

Zahir Qadeer is the son of Haji Abdul Qadeer, a senior member of the anti-Taliban United Islamic Front (Northern Alliance) and one of the first Vice Presidents of the Afghan Transitional Administration. Zahir Qadeer's father and brother-in-law were assassinated on 8 July 2002.

He was born to a Pashtun family that has long-standing ties with Mohammed Zahir Shah, the last king of Afghanistan. He graduated from a high school in Saudi Arabia and studied law in Pakistan.

Zahir Qadeer and two other anti-Taliban leaders were freed from a Taliban prison in 1999 by Abdul-Razzaq Hekmati and Hekmatullah Hekmati, two former Mujahids who had served with the Taliban when they became disillusioned.

On 30 August 2017, at least two security guards were killed in a suicide attack targeting his residence in Jalalabad. Islamic State claimed responsibility for the attacks.

On 10 July 2026, Zahir Qadeer was charged in the United States District Court for the Southern District of New York for allegedly trafficking drugs in South Africa and Kenya, and supposedly attempting to smuggle weapons to DEA informants in 2025.
