= 055 Brigade =

Elite guerrilla military unit

- كتيبة ٥ ٥
- Flag of Al-Qaeda
- Active: 1996–2001
- Disbanded: 2001
- Country: Islamic Emirate of Afghanistan
- Allegiance: Osama bin Laden
- Branch: Islamic Emirate of Afghanistan Army
- Type: Foreign volunteers; Special forces; Assault troops; Protective security
- Size: ~1,000–3,000
- Engagements: Afghan Civil War (1996–2001); Battles of Mazar-i-Sharif (1997–1998); Battle of Bamyan; Battle of Taloqan; United States invasion of Afghanistan; Battle of Tora Bora

The 055 Brigade (Arabic: كتيبة ٥ ٥) was a guerrilla organization loyal to Osama bin Laden that was sponsored and trained by al-Qaeda, and was integrated into the Taliban between 1996 and 2001.

== Composition and role ==
The unit consisted mostly of foreign guerrilla fighters (mujahideen) from the Middle East, Central Asia, Southeast Asia, North Caucasus, and the Balkans who had some form of combat experience, either fighting the Soviet invasion during the 1980s or elsewhere.

They were equipped with weapons left behind by the Soviets, as well as those provided by the Sudanese and Taliban governments. The Brigade was also the beneficiary of al-Qaeda's worldwide network of procurement officers who obtained sophisticated equipment including satellite phones, night vision goggles, and even airplanes. Reports from Time magazine indicate that members of the 055 Brigade were often deployed in smaller groups to help reinforce regular Afghan members of the Taliban. This was often achieved via threats or intimidation designed to enforce discipline and a commitment to the mujahedin philosophy.

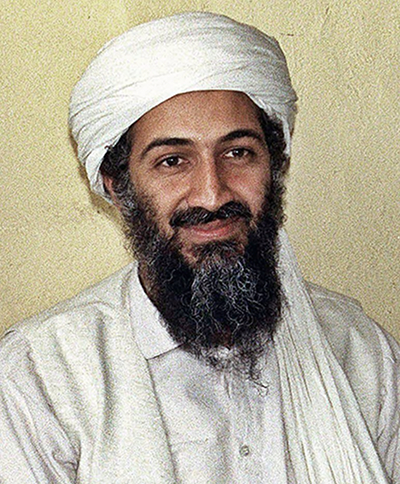
Osama bin Laden

The 055 Brigade were highly trained, highly motivated and well-paid guerrilla fighters set up by Osama bin Laden shortly after he arrived in Afghanistan in 1996. When Bin Laden sought sanctuary in Afghanistan, other Afghan Arabs joined him. The 055 Brigade was set up as a foreign legion to drive ahead with the vision, shared by bin Laden and the Taliban hardline regime, of a global Islamist revolution. About 100 members served as bin Laden's personal security detail.

Before the September 11 attacks and the subsequent United States invasion of Afghanistan in 2001, it had been based and trained at Rish Khor camp outside Kabul. They had no heavy artillery or heavy weapons, and it was believed to be equipped with sophisticated western communications equipment and night vision goggles. Some military sources said they had a collection of small mobile units which has been used to back up Taliban fighters on the frontlines of the civil war. The group was not organised along traditional army structures and borrowed brigade names from the former Afghan army.

== Size ==
Estimates on the strength of the 055 Brigade vary, however, it is generally believed that at its peak it comprised somewhere between 1,000 and 2,000 personnel. During the invasion of Afghanistan, they had at least 500 men; The 055 Brigade suffered heavy losses during the 2001 war in Afghanistan and many were captured by the United States. Those that survived retreated with bin Laden to the Afghanistan–Pakistan border area where they regrouped with the intention of waging a protracted campaign.

According to Joint Task Force Guantanamo counterterrorism analysts the brigade was a unit of foreign fighters in Afghanistan under the command of bin Laden. JTF-GTMO analysts said that, under bin Laden's command, the 055 Brigade was integrated into the Taliban's military. Abdul Hadi al-Iraqi was asserted to be in direct operational control. Mustafa Mohamed Fadhil was his second-in-command.

A Summary of Evidence memo prepared for Guantanamo captive Said Ibrahim Ramzi Al Zahrani's first annual Administrative Review Board, on 14 October 2005 stated, "The al Qaida Force, or 055 Brigade, is Osama bin Laden's primary formation supporting Taliban objectives. Information indicates that the ideology of those in the 055 Brigade includes willingness to give their lives for tactical objectives as declared by Osama bin Laden and the Taliban."

According to the 2005 book Warlords Rising: Confronting Violent Non-State Actors, the 055 Brigade was a mechanized unit.

== History ==
The 055 Brigade was founded by Bin Laden in Afghanistan in 1996. The force had close contacts with militant groups fighting against Indian security forces in Kashmir and with Islamist organisations trying to foment a revolt in Central Asia, particularly the Islamic Movement of Uzbekistan. There were rumours in the weeks before the September 11 attacks that Juma Namangani, had been appointed as one of the top commanders in the 055 brigade.

Most members are volunteers from Chechnya, Pakistan, Bosnia, China and Uzbekistan, who are veterans of battles in their own home nations or the Soviet war in Afghanistan and primarily led by Egyptian and Saudi revolutionaries.

Since at least 1998, the Brigade was used to back up Taliban attacks during the Afghan Civil War: One of their first reported action inside Afghanistan was in 1998 when 055 fighters were used in the battle to capture Mazar-i Sharif. In July 1999 in they took part in the battle for Bamiyan and they were also believed to be behind a string of civilian massacres of the Shia population nearby in Hazarajat, including one attack in early 2001, in which more than 200 people died. On 5 September 2000, 055 fighters were used as part of the 20,000-strong Taliban force which took Taloqan. The loss of the city was one of the biggest setbacks to the Northern Alliance in recent years, which was where their administrative headquarters was located.

The 055 fighters were 3,000 soldiers who were believed to have sought sanctuary in Afghanistan. At least 1,000 more volunteers were believed to have arrived in Afghanistan after the September 11, 2001 Attacks, crossing over from Pakistan and Iran. Many were based at Jalalabad, Khost, Kandahar and Mazar-i Sharif.

In the initial airstrikes during the coalition invasion of Afghanistan in 2001, a garrison of 055 Brigade fighters near Mazar-i-Sharif was one of the first targets for US aircraft. U.S. Defense Secretary Donald Rumsfeld described the troops as "the al-Qaida-dominated ground force". The units tended to be much better motivated than regular Taliban soldiers and regarded as better fighters than the Afghans. They were used to "give backbone" to the fight and prevent defections. Some 055 Brigade members escaped with as many as several hundred al-Qaeda during the Battle of Tora Bora.

According to the Long War Journal, the 055 Brigade had been reestablished as part of the Taliban's Lashkar al Zil or 'Shadow Army.'

== See also ==
- Afghan Arabs
- Mujahideen in Chechnya

Yugoslav wars:

- Bosnian mujahideen
