= Atiqullah Baryalai =

Military General, Former Deputy Defense Minister of Islamic Republic of Afghanistan

Lieutenant General Atiqullah Baryalai
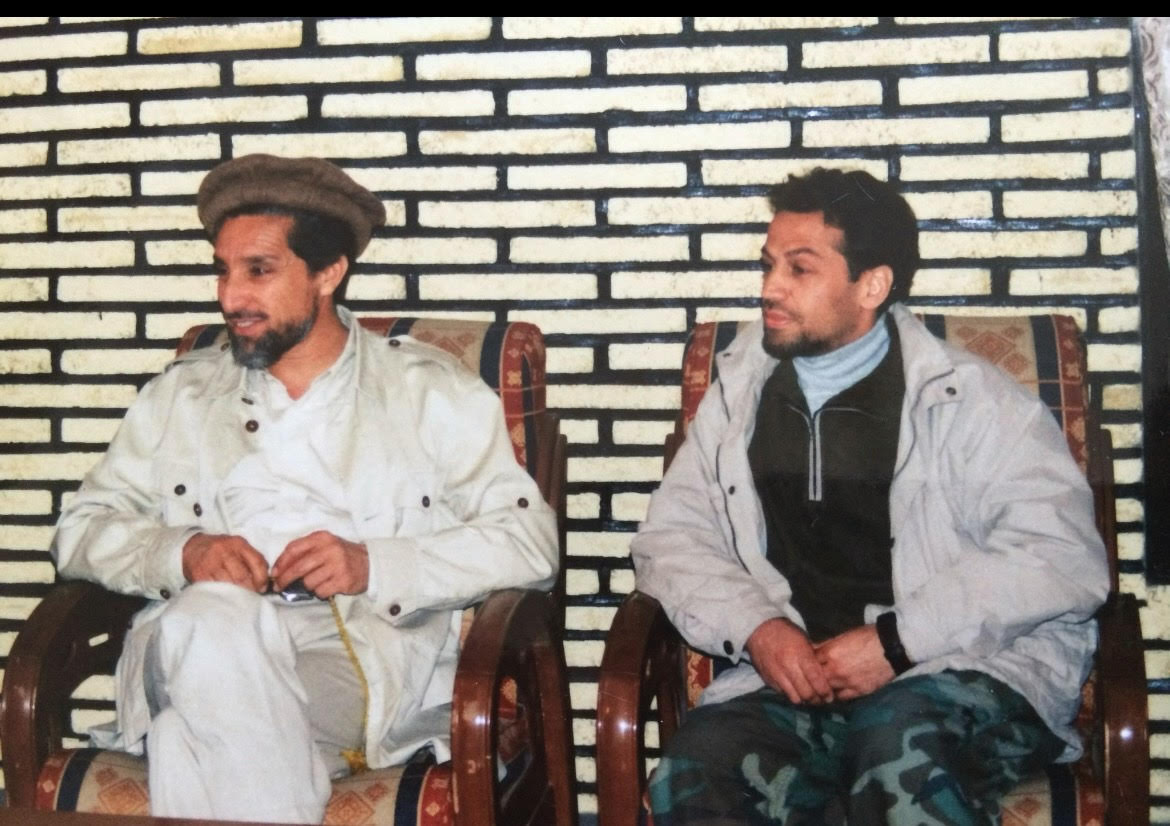
- General Baryalai with Commander Ahmad Shah Massoud

Deputy Defense Minister
- In office 2002–2003

Personal details
- Born: 1965 (age 60–61)

Military service
- Allegiance: Northern Alliance Islamic Republic of Afghanistan
- Branch/service: Afghan National Army
- Rank: Lieutenant General (Dagar Jenral)

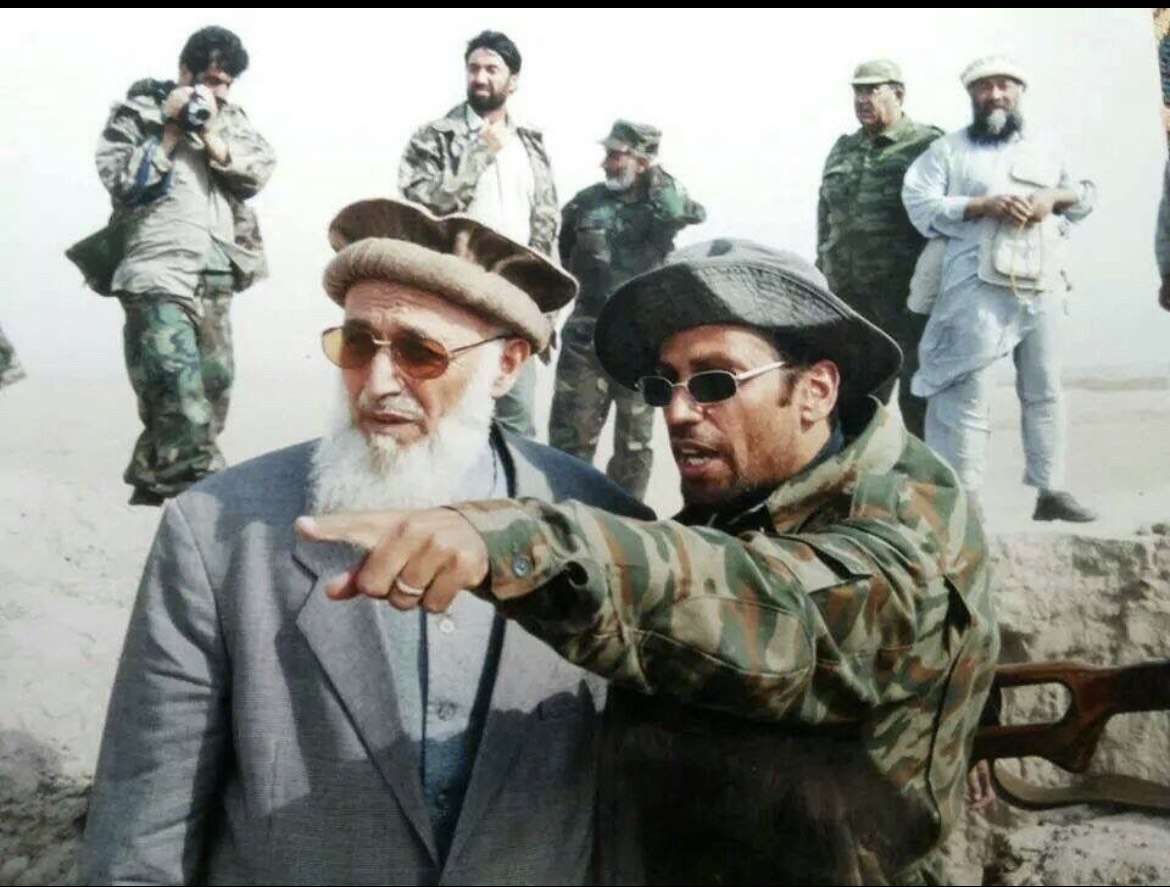
General Baryalai and Ustad Rabbani

Atiqullah Baryalai (Persian: عتیق‌الله بریالی; born 1965) is a former Afghan military officer. He was a senior commander of the Northern Front; playing a critical role in the fight against the USSR Invasion of Afghanistan, Taliban and Al-Qaeda. He served as the Deputy Defense Minister of Afghanistan from 2002 to 2003. General Baryalai also headed the successful Disarmament Demobilization and Re-integration Commission (DDR), the Revival and Rebuilding of National Army Commission and the Reform Committee of the Ministry of Defense until 2003.

General Atiqullah Baryalai was one of the key commanders Northern Alliance; he worked closely and extensively with its leader, Ahmad Shah Massoud, in the resistance against the 1980s Soviet invasion of Afghanistan and the continuous fight against the Taliban, Al-Qaeda and the war on terrorism. From the 1990s onwards, he developed innovative mechanized units that were crucial in defeating the Taliban and Al-Qaeda, later forming the foundation of Afghanistan’s national army. In 2001 General Baryalai recaptured numerous, vital territories against the Taliban such as in Mazar-e-Sharif, Kunduz and Kabul.

He is a Tajik from Panjshir Province. General Baryalai studied at the Royal College of Defence Studies in London. He was educated at Naderia High School, the National Military Academy of Afghanistan (BA, 1994) and University of East Anglia (MA International Relations and Development Studies, 2012).

== Criticisms of Karzai, Ghani Governments & US Strategy in Afghanistan ==
General Baryalai has long been an outspoken critic of the administrations of Presidents Hamid Karzai and Ashraf Ghani, particularly over issues of corruption, sectarianism, and ethnic bias. He has argued that these traits of both presidencies severely hindered Afghanistan’s prosperity, deepened internal divisions, and contributed to the resurgence of the Taliban.

=== Karzai Government ===
General Baryalai condemned President Karzai for accepting foreign cash payments, describing it as "shameful for him to take money directly from an intelligence organization." He pointed out that Karzai used these funds to buy loyalty rather than serve the country's interests. This is criticism of Karzai was echoed by President Obama, who in 2009, warned 'Karzai to focus on corruption'. It was this rampant corruption and drug trade that fuelled the Taliban resurgence.

General Baryalai strongly criticised President Karzai's refusal to sign a Bilateral Security Agreement (BSA) with the US in 2013, despite the Grand Council and citizens overwhelmingly endorsing it.

General Baryalai expressed his disapproval of Karzai’s inconsistent condemnations. He noted that while Karzai was vocal in criticizing U.S. actions that caused civilian harm, he often remained silent or less responsive when the Taliban carried out even more devastating attacks. General Baryalai's critique underscored concerns about Karzai's leadership approach and his handling of Afghanistan's complex security challenges.

=== Ghani Government ===
Regarding President Ghani’s administration, General Baryalai has voiced concerns about ethnic favoritism. In a 2018 interview, he criticized Ghani for appointing individuals from his own ethnic group to key government positions, arguing that such practices undermined national unity and fueled ethnic tensions.

=== US Strategy ===
Baryalai critiqued the lack of a clear military and political strategy, highlighting insurgency and regional radicalism as the primary threats. He advocated for a national security strategy centered on these challenges, recommending mobile, cost-effective weapons like helicopters and light artillery. These strategic gaps eventually led to the fall of Afghanistan in 2021.
