= Northern Alliance =

1996–2001 anti-Taliban military front in Afghanistan

- ائتلاف شمال
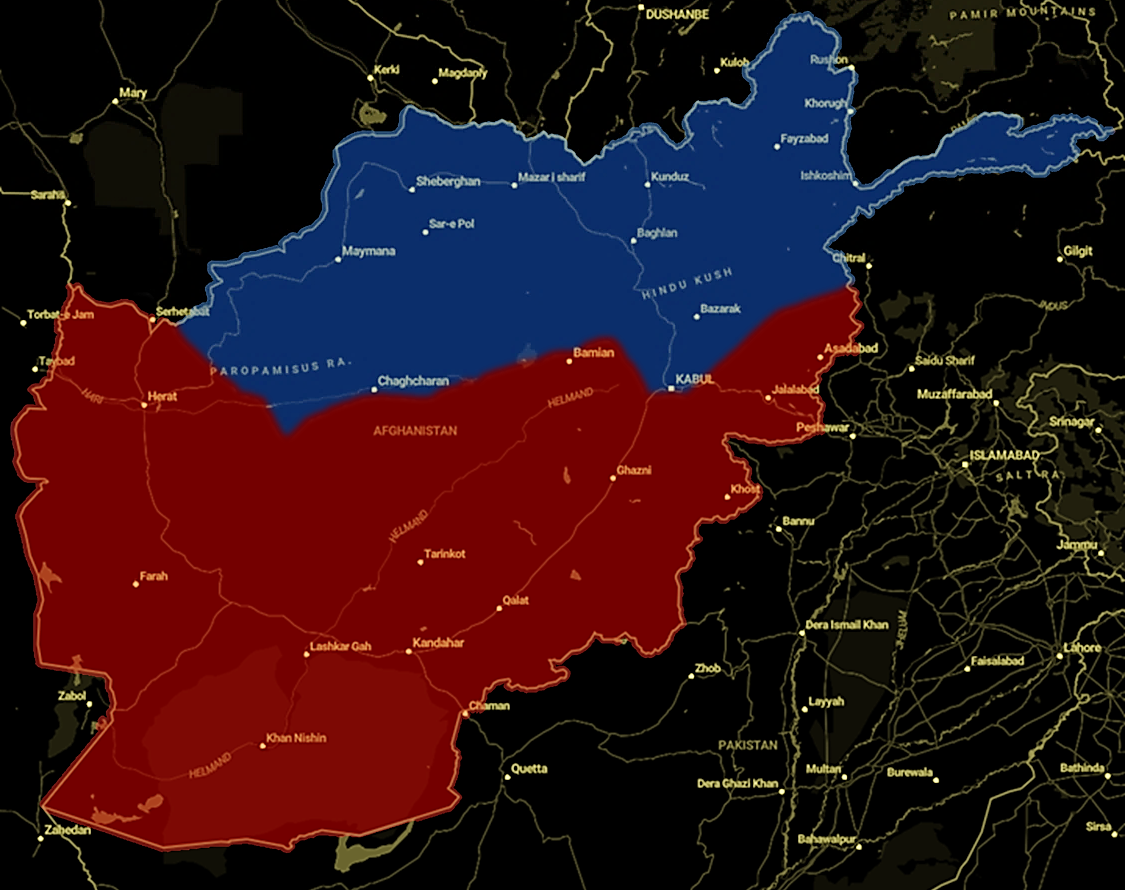
- Top: The flag flown by the Northern Alliance; Bottom: Maximum territorial control of the Northern Alliance (blue) against that of the Taliban (red) in Afghanistan in 1996
- Leaders: Burhanuddin Rabbani; Ahmad Shah Massoud; Haji Abdul Haq; Mohammed Fahim; Atiqullah Baryalai; Abdul Rashid Dostum; Abdullah Abdullah; Haji Abdul Qadeer; Muhammad Mohaqiq; Karim Khalili; Sayed Mohammad Ali Jawid
- Dates active: September 1996 – December 2001
- Groups: Jamiat-e Islami; (Afghanistan) Junbish-i Milli; (Afghanistan) Eastern Shura; Ittehad-e Islami; National Islamic Front of Afghanistan; (Afghanistan) Harakat-e Islami; Hezbe Wahdat
- Headquarters: Taloqan, Afghanistan (until September 2000); Fayzabad, Afghanistan (September 2000–November 2001)
- Active regions: Afghanistan
- Ideology: Islamism; Islamic democracy Anti-communism; Anti-Taliban Factions: Afghan nationalism; Ethnic Interests; Minority rights; Uzbek and Turkmen Interests; Afghan Tajik Interests; Pashtun Interests; Secularism; Wahhabism; Communitarianism; Royalism
- Political position: Big Tent
- Status: Disbanded
- Size: 80,000 (1997), 50,000 (2001)
- Part of: Islamic State of Afghanistan
- Wars: Third Afghan Civil War; War in Afghanistan (2001–2021); U.S invasion of Afghanistan

The Northern Alliance, (Note: Dari: اتحاد شمال, romanized: Ittihād-i Šamāl; Pashto: د شمال ائتلاف, romanized: Də Šamāl I'tilāf) officially known as the National United Islamic Front for the Salvation of Afghanistan, (Note: Dari: جبهه متحد اسلامی ملی برای نجات افغانستان, romanized: Jabha-yi Muttahid-i Islāmī-yi Millī barāy-i najāt-i Afğānistān) was an Afghan military organization which fought the Taliban-led Islamic Emirate of Afghanistan from 1996 to 2001 during the Third Afghan Civil War. The organization maintained wide international recognition as the Islamic State of Afghanistan.

The group was founded in September 1996, following the Taliban's takeover of Kabul, by a number of military commanders such as Ahmad Shah Massoud, Ali Mazari and Abdul Rashid Dostum. The alliance was mainly composed of northern ethnic groups of Afghanistan, such as Tajiks, Hazaras and Uzbeks, though later some Pashtuns were also integrated under the leadership of Haji Abdul Qadir. The alliance's main backer was Iran while the Taliban were extensively supported by Pakistan. By 2001 the Northern Alliance had lost control of pivotal cities and controlled only about 5% of the country, cornered in the northeast and based in Badakhshan province. Its military leader Ahmad Shah Massoud was assassinated on 9 September 2001, two days prior to the September 11 attacks in the United States, which were carried out by the Taliban's ally al-Qaeda. In October 2001, the U.S. invaded Afghanistan, providing support to Northern Alliance troops on the ground in a short war against the Taliban, which they eventually won in December 2001.

With the Taliban forced from control of the country, the Northern Alliance was dissolved as members and parties supported the new Afghan Interim Administration, with some members later becoming part of the Karzai administration. Amidst the fall of Kabul to the Taliban in 2021, a number of former Northern Alliance commanders and other anti-Taliban leaders regrouped as the National Resistance Front (NRF) under the control of Ahmad Massoud, the son of Ahmad Shah Massoud. As such, the NRF has often been regarded as the successor to the Northern Alliance.

== Commanders and factions ==
The Northern Alliance was formed in late 1996 against the Taliban government by opposition factions. Since early 1999, Ahmad Shah Massoud was the only main leader able to defend his territory against the Taliban, and as such remained as the main de facto political and military leader of the United Front recognized by members of all the different ethnic groups. Massoud decided on the main political line and the general military strategy of the alliance. A part of the United Front military factions, such as Junbish-i Milli or Hezb-e Wahdat, did not fall under the direct control of Massoud but remained under their respective regional or ethnic leaders.

Military commanders of the United Front were either independent or belonged to one of the following political parties:

- the Sunni Tajik-dominated Jamiat-e Islami and Shura-e Nazar, led by Burhanuddin Rabbani and Ahmad Shah Massoud
- the Shia Hazara-dominated Hezb-e Wahdat, led by Muhammad Mohaqiq and Karim Khalili
- the Sunni Uzbek and Turkmen-dominated Junbish-i Milli, led by Abdul Rashid Dostum
- the Sunni Pashtun-dominated Eastern Shura, led by Haji Abdul Haq and Haji Abdul Qadeer
- the Shia Tajik and Hazara-dominated Harakat-e Islami, led by Asif Mohseni and Sayed Mohammad Ali Jawid

Military commanders and subcommanders of the United Front included:

- From northern Afghanistan: Bismillah Khan Mohammadi (Jamiat-e Islami), Atta Muhammad Nur (Jamiat-e Islami), General Atiqullah Baryalai (Jamiat-e Islami), General Shahjahan Noori (Jamiat-e Islami), Mohammed Daud Daud (Jamiat-e Islami), Mohammed Fahim (Jamiat-e Islami), Gul Haidar (Jamiat-e Islami), Muhammad Mohaqiq (Hezb-e Wahdat), Abdul Rashid Dostum (Junbish-i Milli), Qazi Kabir Marzban;
- From eastern Afghanistan: Haji Abdul Qadeer (Eastern Shura), Hazrat Ali (Eastern Shura), Jaan Daad Khan, Abdullah Wahedi, Qatrah and Najmuddin;
- From southern Afghanistan: Qari Baba, Mohammad Arif Noorzai and Hotak;
- From western Afghanistan: Ismail Khan (Jamiat-e Islami), Doctor Ibrahim, and Fazlkarim Aimaq;
- From central Afghanistan: Sayed Mustafa Kazemi (Hezb-e Wahdat), Said Hussein Aalemi Balkhi, Akbari, Sayed Mohammad Ali Jawid, Karim Khalili (Hezb-e Wahdat) and Sher Alam Ibrahimi (Ittehad-e Islami).

The two main political candidates in the 2009 Afghan presidential election both worked for the United Front:

- Abdullah Abdullah (was a close friend of Ahmad Shah Massoud and the foreign minister of the alliance)
- Hamid Karzai (his father was killed by the Taliban, he subsequently went on a diplomatic mission to gather support for Massoud in Europe and the U.S in 2000/2001)

=== Headquarters ===
Initially, the city of Mazar-i-Sharif under Dostum's control served as one of the Northern Alliance's headquarters, until the city was overrun in 1997. Under Massoud's control, Taloqan in Takhar Province, north of Panjshir, was the group's headquarters until September 5, 2000, when the city was taken by the Taliban and led to its base moving to Badakhshan Province. Massoud also maintained a private residence in Dushanbe, Tajikistan. It was there where Massoud would meet international diplomatic staff who supported the Northern Alliance.

of groups that operated between early 1992 and 2001 following the dissolution of the Soviet Union. It was formed by military leaders such as Ahmad Shah Massoud, Burhanuddin Rabbani, Abdul Rashid Dostum, Abdul Momim and Ali Mazari. It consisted mainly of ethnicities from northern Afghanistan, such as Tajiks, Uzbeks, Hazaras, and Turkmens, as opposed to the Pashtun-led Taliban. At that time, many non-Pashtun Northerners originally with the Republic of Afghanistan led by Mohammad Najibullah became disaffected with Pashtun Khalqist Afghan Army officers holding control over non-Pashtun militias in the North. The alliance's capture of Mazar-i-Sharif and more importantly the supplies kept there crippled the Afghan military and began the end of Najibullah's government. Following the collapse of Najibullah's government, the Alliance would fall with a second civil war breaking out. However, following the Taliban's takeover of Kabul and establishment of their Islamic Emirate of Afghanistan, the United Front was reassembled.

== History ==
=== Background ===
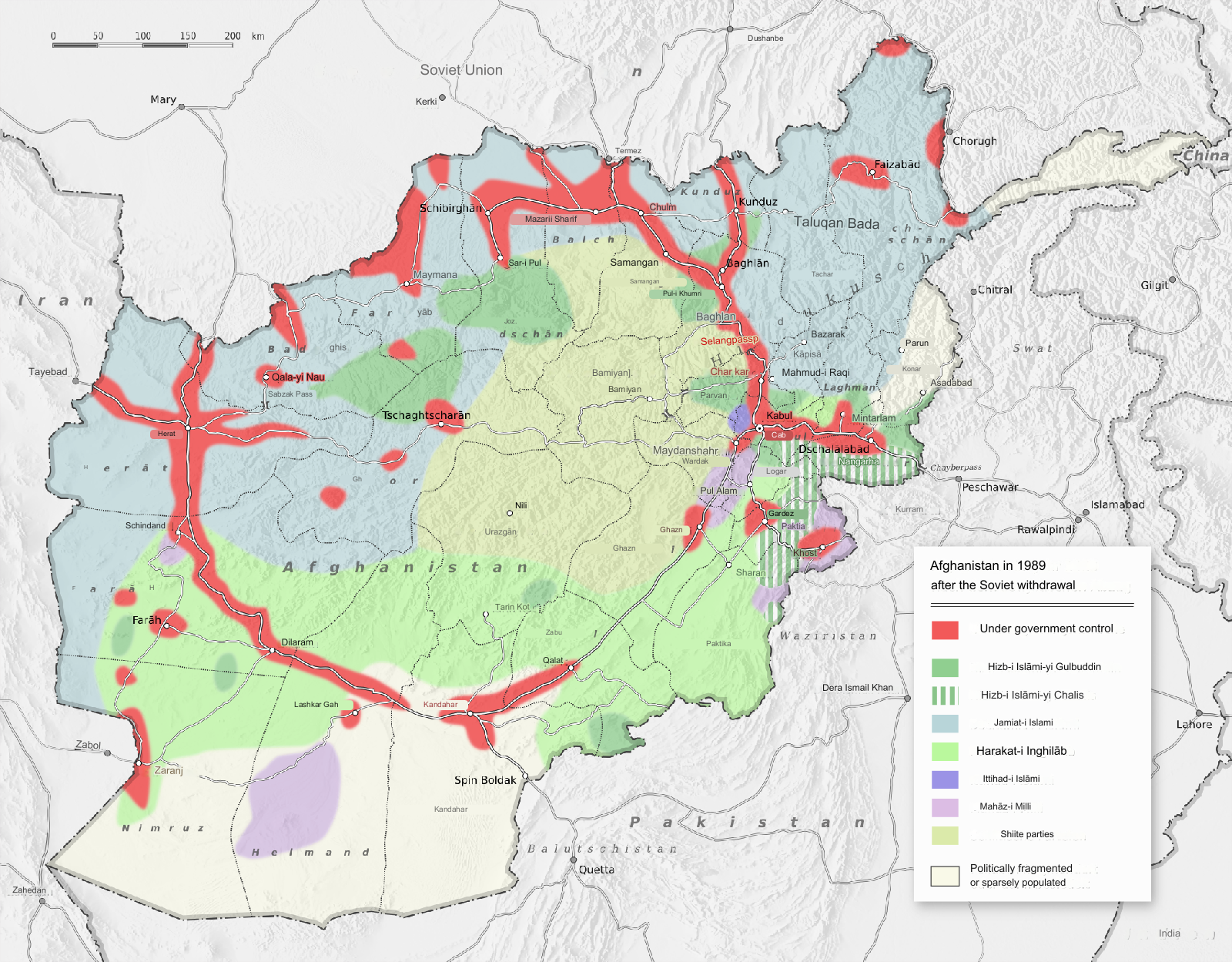
Afghanistan after the Soviet retreat. Shura-e Nazar/Jamiat-e Islami (blue), Hezb-e Wahdat and Harakat-e Islami (yellow), Ittehad-e Islami (violet), communist groups including Junbish-i Milli (red), Hezb-e Islami Gulbuddin (dark green), Hezb-e Islami Khalis (white-green striped), Harakat-i-Inqilab including many later Taliban (light green).

During the early 1990s the Najibullah regime funded pro government militias all over the country in order to fight the mujahedeen insurgency however Najibullah, an ethnic Pashtun began to mistrust the mostly non-Pashtun militias in the north many of whom had ties to Ahmad Shah Massoud. In an effort to reassert his control over the supply lines in the North, Najibullah replaced General Abdul Momim, an ethnic Tajik, with General Rasul, a Pashtun Khalqi known for being the brutal commander of Pul-e-Charkhi. Momim refused to step down, he and ethnic Uzbek, General Rashid Dostum defected and allied with Ahmad Shah Massoud and Ali Mazari forming the Northern Alliance. The alliance would take the city of Mazar-i Sharif on March 19, 1992 and launching a massive offensive towards the capital of Kabul. Many non Pashtuns in the Afghan military defected to the alliance.

After removing Najibullah from power the alliance would dismantle as another civil war would break out between the various groups and Gulbuddin Hekmatyar's Hezbi Islami which many Pashtun Khalqists allied with. The civil war would see foreign interference from Saudi Arabia and Iran, as competitors for regional hegemony, supported Afghan militias hostile towards each other. According to Human Rights Watch, Iran was backing the Shia Hazara Hezb-e Wahdat forces of Abdul Ali Mazari in order to "maximize Wahdat's military power and influence". Saudi Arabia supported the Wahhabite Abdul Rasul Sayyaf and his Ittehad-e Islami faction. A publication by the George Washington University describes:

[O]utside forces saw instability in Afghanistan as an opportunity to press their own security and political agendas.

Conflict between the two militias soon escalated into a full-scale war.

Due to the sudden initiation of the war, working government departments, police units or a system of justice and accountability for the newly created Islamic State of Afghanistan did not have time to form. Atrocities were committed by individuals of the different armed factions while Kabul descended into lawlessness and chaos as described in reports by Human Rights Watch and the Afghanistan Justice Project. Because of the chaos, some leaders increasingly had only nominal control over their (sub-)commanders. Human Rights Watch writes:

Rare ceasefires, usually negotiated by representatives of Ahmad Shah Massoud, Sibghatullah Mojaddedi or Burhanuddin Rabbani [the interim government], or officials from the International Committee of the Red Cross (ICRC), commonly collapsed within days.

Meanwhile, southern Afghanistan was under the control of local leaders not affiliated with the central government in Kabul. In 1994, the Taliban – a movement originating from Jamiat Ulema-e-Islam–run religious schools for Afghan refugees in Pakistan – also developed in Afghanistan as a politico-religious force. In November 1994 they took control of the southern city of Kandahar and subsequently expanded their control into several provinces in southern and central Afghanistan not under the central government's control.

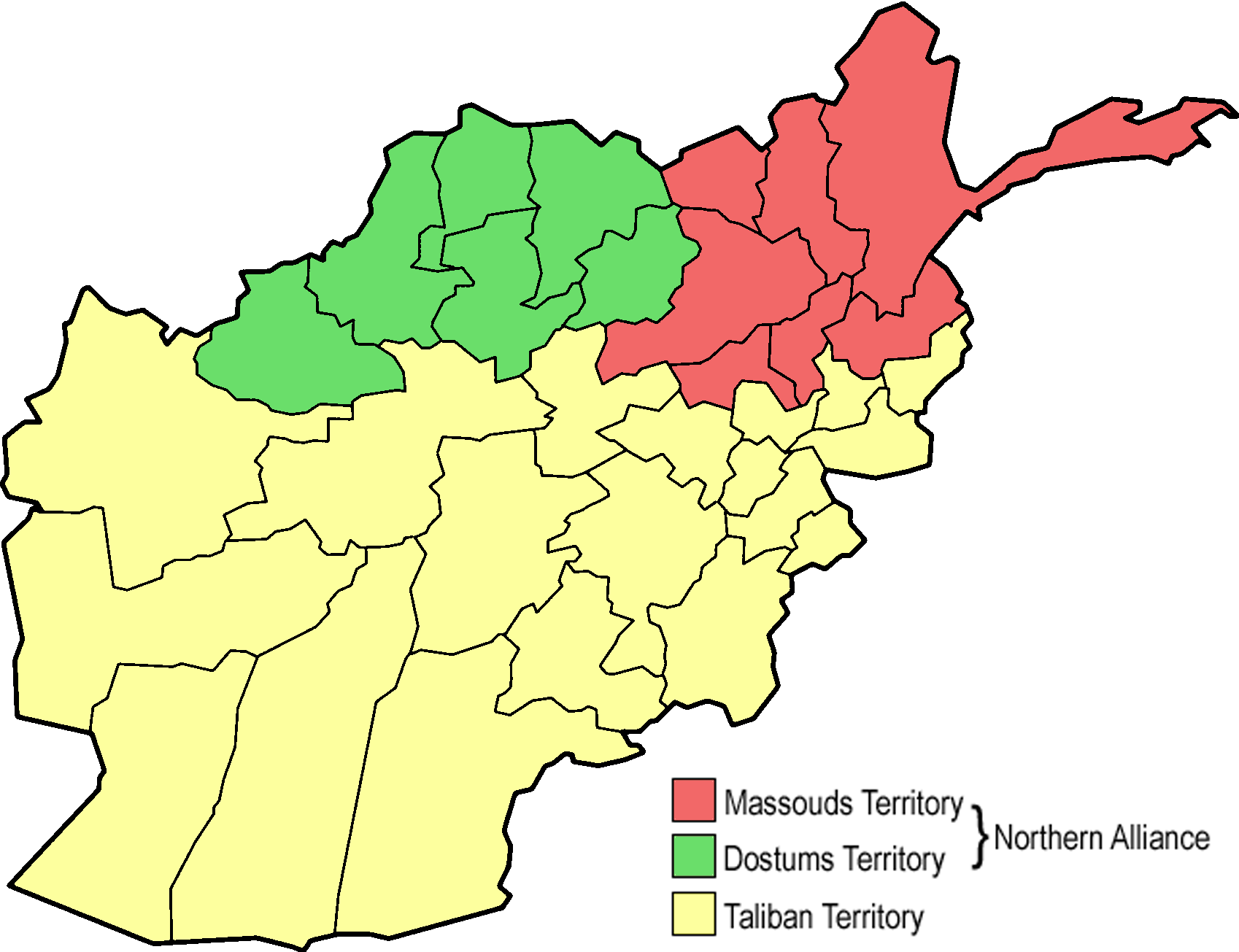
Map of the situation in Afghanistan in late 1996; Massoud (red), Dostum (green) and Taliban (yellow) territories.

In late 1994, most of the militia factions which had been fighting in the battle for control of Kabul were defeated militarily by forces of the Islamic State's Minister of Defense Ahmad Shah Massoud. Bombardment of the capital came to a halt. The Islamic State government took steps to restore law and order. Courts started to work again. Massoud tried to initiate a nationwide political process with the goal of national consolidation and democratic elections, also inviting the Taliban to join the process but they refused as they opposed a democratic system.

The Taliban started shelling Kabul in early 1995 but were defeated by forces of the Islamic State government under Ahmad Shah Massoud. Amnesty International, referring to the Taliban offensive, wrote in a 1995 report:

This is the first time in several months that Kabul civilians have become the targets of rocket attacks and shelling aimed at residential areas in the city.

The Taliban's early victories in 1994 were followed by a series of defeats that resulted in heavy losses which led analysts to believe the Taliban movement had run its course. At that point Pakistan and Saudi Arabia drastically increased their support to the Taliban. Many analysts like Amin Saikal describe the Taliban as developing into a proxy force for Pakistan's regional interests. On September 26, 1996, as the Taliban with military support by Pakistan and financial support by Saudi Arabia, prepared for another major offensive against the capital Kabul, Massoud ordered a full retreat from the city. The Taliban seized Kabul on September 27, 1996, and established the Islamic Emirate of Afghanistan.

=== Reestablishment of the United Front ===
Ahmad Shah Massoud and Abdul Rashid Dostum, former allies and enemies, recreated a United Front (Northern Alliance) against the Taliban that were preparing offensives against the remaining areas under the control of Massoud and those under the control of Dostum. The United Front included beside the dominantly Tajik forces of Massoud and the Uzbek forces of Dostum, Hazara troops led by Haji Mohammad Mohaqiq and Pashtun forces under the leadership of commanders such as Abdul Haq and Haji Abdul Qadir. Notable politicians and diplomats of the United Front included Abdul Rahim Ghafoorzai, Abdullah Abdullah and Masood Khalili. From the Taliban conquest of Kabul in September 1996 until November 2001 the United Front controlled roughly 30% of Afghanistan's population in provinces such as Badakhshan, Kapisa, Takhar and parts of Parwan, Kunar, Nuristan, Laghman, Samangan, Kunduz, Ghōr and Bamyan.

=== Foreign intervention ===
Throughout the 1990s, Iran was the primary state sponsor of the Northern Alliance, along with Tajikistan and Russia. By contrast, the Taliban were supported by Pakistan, Saudi Arabia and the UAE. Because of Indian influence in the Alliance, Pakistan feared a Northern Alliance victory would result in Pakistan's encirclement by India on one side and an Indian-allied Northern Alliance on the other. During the 1990s, Turkey also supported the Northern Alliance. Israel was initially not critical of the Taliban, as both governments opposed Iran, and the Mossad reached out to the Taliban. However, later, under pressure from United States and Turkey, Israel instead began reaching out to the Northern Alliance, even though it remained suspicious of the Alliance's pro-Iran position.

Due to Indian backing of Karzai's administration and a consequent overwhelming support for India among Karzai's Afghan government officials, Pakistan looked to neutralise this threat by cultivating the Taliban in 2001. The assistance provided by India was extensive, including uniforms, ordnance, mortars, small armaments, refurbished Kalashnikovs, combat and winter clothes, as well as funds. In 2001 alone, according to several international sources, 28,000–30,000 Afghans, who took refuge in Pakistan during Afghan jihad, 14,000–15,000 Afghan Taliban and 2,000–3,000 Al Qaeda militants were fighting against anti-Taliban forces in Afghanistan as a roughly 45,000 strong military force. Former Pakistani President Pervez Musharraf – then as Chief of Army Staff – was responsible for sending thousands of Pakistanis to fight alongside the Taliban and Bin Laden against the forces of Ahmad Shah Massoud. Of the estimated 28,000 Afghan refugees returned from Pakistan fighting in Afghanistan, 8,000 were militants recruited in madrassas filling regular Taliban ranks. A 1998 document by the U.S. State Department confirms that "20–40 percent of [regular] Taliban soldiers are returned Afghans from Pakistani refugee camps".

Human Rights Watch wrote in 2000:

Of all the foreign powers involved in efforts to sustain and manipulate the ongoing fighting [in Afghanistan], Pakistan is distinguished both by the sweep of its objectives and the scale of its efforts, which include soliciting funding for the Taliban, bankrolling Taliban operations, providing diplomatic support as the Taliban's virtual emissaries abroad, arranging training for Taliban fighters, recruiting skilled and unskilled manpower to serve in Taliban armies, planning and directing offensives, providing and facilitating shipments of ammunition and fuel, and ... directly providing combat support.

After Taliban captured Kabul, Iran's assistance to the Northern Alliance increased dramatically. Iran established an "airbridge" between Mashhad and the Afghan airbases of Bagram and Kulyab to ferry large quantities of arms to the Northern Alliance. For example, it was reported that on one day alone in 1997, 13 Iranian flights arrived at Bagram. In another instance, Iran was believed to have been found sending 700 tons of arms via Tajikistan.

On August 1, 1997 the Taliban launched an attack on Sheberghan, the main military base of Abdul Rashid Dostum. Dostum has said the reason the attack was successful was due to 1500 Pakistani commandos taking part and that the Pakistani air force also gave support.

In October to November 1998, the Northern Alliance used Iranian and Russian arms to recapture territory from the Taliban near the Uzbekistan and Tajikistan border.

In 1998, Iran accused Pakistan of sending its air force to bomb Mazar-i-Sharif in support of Taliban forces and directly accused Pakistani troops for "war crimes at Bamiyan". The same year Russia said that Pakistan was responsible for the military expansion of the Taliban in northern Afghanistan by sending large numbers of Pakistani troops, some of whom had subsequently been taken prisoner by the anti-Taliban United Front.

In 2000, the UN Security Council imposed an arms embargo against military support to the Taliban, with UN officials explicitly singling out Pakistan. The UN secretary-general implicitly criticized Pakistan for its military support and the Security Council stated it was "deeply distress[ed] over reports of involvement in the fighting, on the Taliban side, of thousands of non-Afghan nationals". In July 2001, several countries including the United States, accused Pakistan of being "in violation of U.N. sanctions because of its military aid to the Taliban".

In 2000, British Intelligence reported that the intelligence agency ISI was taking an active role in several Al-Qaeda training camps. The ISI allegedly helped with the construction of training camps for both the Taliban and Al-Qaeda. From 1996 to 2001 the Al Qaeda of Osama bin Laden and Ayman al-Zawahiri became a state within the Taliban state. Bin Laden sent Arab and Central Asian Al-Qaeda militants to join the fight against the United Front among them his 055 Brigade.

With the fall of Kabul to anti-Taliban forces in November 2001, ISI forces worked with and helped Taliban militias who were in full retreat. In November 2001, Taliban, Al-Qaeda combatants and ISI operatives were safely evacuated from Kunduz on Pakistan Air Force cargo aircraft to Pakistan Air Force bases in Chitral and Gilgit in Pakistan's Northern Areas in what has been dubbed the "Airlift of Evil".

The role of the Pakistani military has been described by international observers as well as by the anti-Taliban leader Ahmad Shah Massoud as a "creeping invasion". The "creeping invasion" proved unable to defeat the severely outnumbered anti-Taliban forces.

=== Taliban massacres ===
According to a report by the United Nations, the Taliban, while trying to consolidate control over northern and western Afghanistan, committed systematic massacres against civilians. UN officials stated that there had been "15 massacres" between 1996 and 2001. They also said, that "[t]hese have been highly systematic and they all lead back to the [Taliban] Ministry of Defense or to Mullah Omar himself". Al Qaeda's so-called 055 Brigade was also responsible for mass-killings of Afghan civilians. The report by the United Nations quotes eyewitnesses in many villages describing Arab fighters "carrying long knives used for slitting throats and skinning people".

=== Ahmad Shah Massoud ===
After longstanding battles especially for the northern city of Mazar-i-Sharif, Abdul Rashid Dostum and his Junbish-i Milli forces alongside allied Hezb-e Wahdat forces were defeated by the Taliban and their allies in 1998. Dostum subsequently went into exile. Ahmad Shah Massoud remained the only major anti-Taliban leader inside the country who was able to defend vast parts of his territory against the Pakistani Army, the Taliban and Al-Qaeda, not once leaving Afghanistan except for diplomatic purposes.

The Taliban repeatedly offered Massoud money and a position of power to make him stop his resistance. Massoud declined. He explained in one interview:

The Taliban say: "Come and accept the post of prime minister and be with us", and they would keep the highest office in the country, the presidentship. But for what price?! The difference between us concerns mainly our way of thinking about the very principles of the society and the state. We can not accept their conditions of compromise, or else we would have to give up the principles of modern democracy. We are fundamentally against the system called "the Emirate of Afghanistan".

There should be an Afghanistan where every Afghan finds himself or herself happy. And I think that can only be assured by democracy based on consensus.

Massoud wanted to convince the Taliban to join a political process leading towards democratic elections in a foreseeable future. He also stated:

The Taliban are not a force to be considered invincible. They are distanced from the people now. They are weaker than in the past. There is only the assistance given by Pakistan, Osama bin Laden and other extremist groups that keep the Taliban on their feet. With a halt to that assistance, it is extremely difficult to survive.

In early 2001 the United Front employed a new strategy of local military pressure and global political appeals. Resentment was increasingly gathering against Taliban rule from the bottom of Afghan society including the Pashtun areas. In total, estimates range up to one million people fleeing the Taliban. Many civilians fled to the area of Ahmad Shah Massoud. National Geographic concluded in its documentary "Inside the Taliban": "The only thing standing in the way of future Taliban massacres is Ahmad Shah Massoud". In the areas under his control Massoud set up democratic institutions and signed the Women's Rights Declaration. At the same time he was very wary not to revive the failed Kabul government of the early 1990s. Already in 1999 the United Front leadership ordered the training of police forces specifically to keep order and protect the civilian population in case the United Front would be successful. In early 2001 Ahmad Shah Massoud addressed the European Parliament in Brussels asking the international community to provide humanitarian help to the people of Afghanistan. He stated that the Taliban and Al Qaeda had introduced "a very wrong perception of Islam" and that without the support of Pakistan and Bin Laden the Taliban would not be able to sustain their military campaign for up to a year. On this visit to Europe he also warned that his intelligence had gathered information about a large-scale attack on U.S. soil being imminent.

On September 9, 2001, two Arab suicide attackers, belonging to Al Qaeda and posing as journalists, detonated a bomb hidden in a video camera while interviewing Ahmed Shah Massoud in the Takhar province of Afghanistan. Commander Massoud died in a helicopter that was taking him to a hospital. He was buried in his home village of Bazarak in the Panjshir Valley. The funeral, although taking place in a rather rural area, was attended by hundreds of thousands of mourning people.

The assassination of Massoud is considered to have a strong connection to the attacks in the U.S. two days later, which killed nearly 3,000 people and which appeared to be the terrorist attack that Massoud had warned against in his speech to the European Parliament several months earlier. John P. O'Neill was a counter-terrorism expert and the Assistant Director of the FBI until late 2001. He retired from the FBI and was offered the position of director of security at the World Trade Center (WTC). He took the job at the WTC two weeks before 9/11. On September 10, 2001, John O'Neill told two of his friends,

We're due. And we're due for something big. ... Some things have happened in Afghanistan [referring to the assassination of Massoud]. I don't like the way things are lining up in Afghanistan. ... I sense a shift, and I think things are going to happen. ... soon.

O'Neill died the following day, when the south tower collapsed.

After the terrorist attacks of September 11, 2001, United Front troops ousted the Taliban from power in Kabul with American air support in Operation Enduring Freedom, using intelligence reports offered by Iran during the Six plus Two Group meetings at the United Nations Headquarters. In November and December 2001 the United Front gained control of much of the country and played a crucial role in establishing the post-Taliban interim government of Hamid Karzai in late 2001.

=== Post-9/11 ===
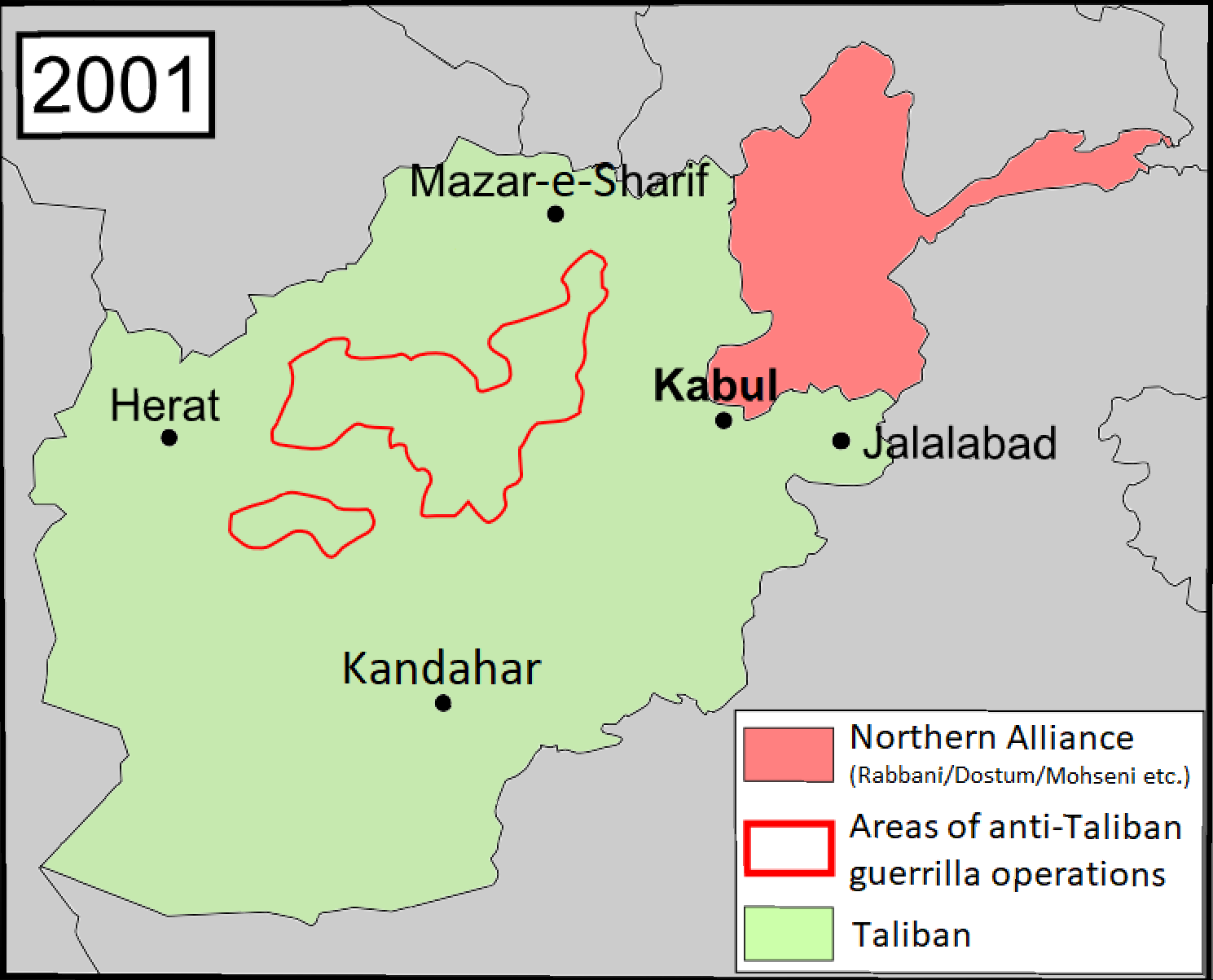
Territorial control of Northern Alliance before the U.S. invasion of Afghanistan

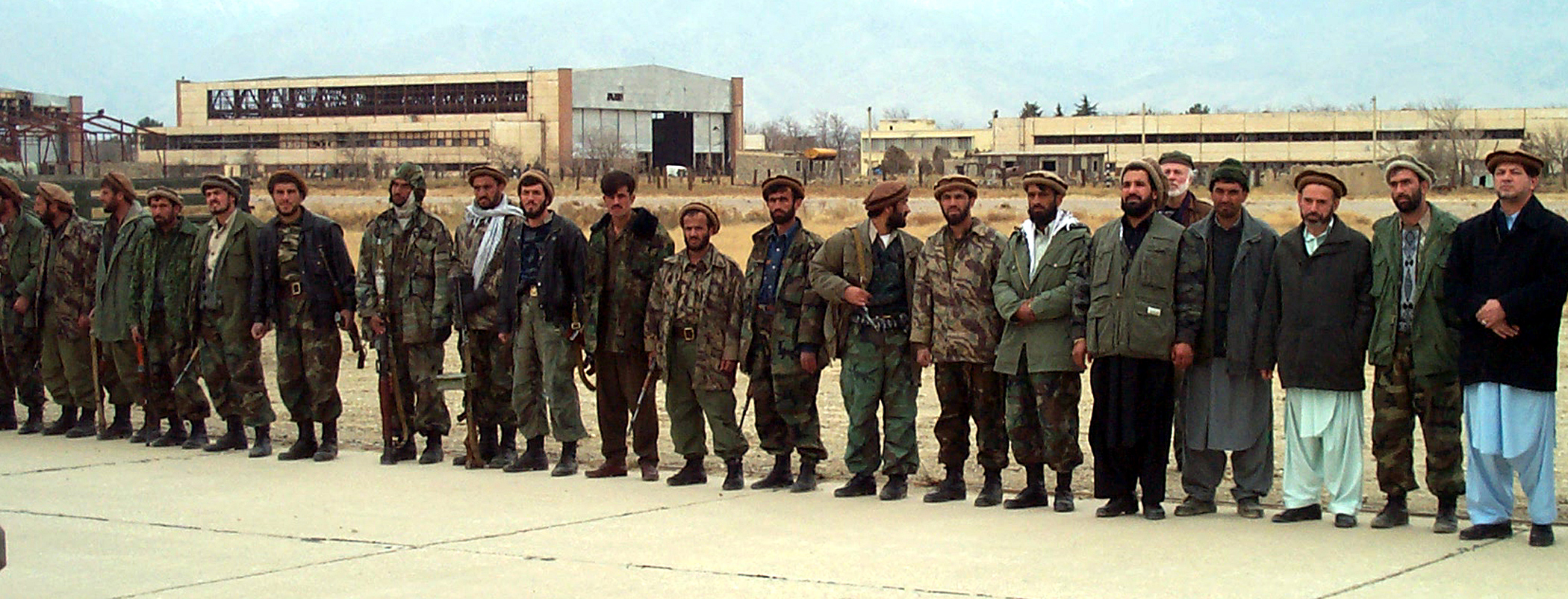
United Front troops lined up next to the runway at Bagram Airfield in Parwan Province. (December 16, 2001)

After 9/11, the United Front succeeded in retaking Kabul from the Taliban with air support from US-led forces during Operation Enduring Freedom. Despite fears of a return to the chaos similar to that of the 1992–1996 civil war, all the Afghan leaders met in Germany to create a new government. Hamid Karzai was chosen to lead the country and most key positions were given to Tajik members of the Northern Alliance. This created a major international issue. While Pakistan has always favored Afghanistan's major ethnic group, the Pashtun, India saw an opportunity for increasing its regional power by jumping on board with the support of the Northern Alliance in the early days of the war. With both nations seeking to increase or maintain their regional power through opposing factions on the ground, observers came to view the conflict in Afghanistan as a proxy-war between the two state powers.

From 2002 to 2004, war activity in Afghanistan was relatively calm. By 2006, however, with the support of Pakistan and Iran, a Taliban insurgency gained increasing strength. In 2010, Afghan President Karzai decided that the only way to end the Taliban insurgency was to call for peace. This process became accepted and supported by all international partners of Afghanistan, except by several key figures of the Northern Alliance such as Abdullah Abdullah, Ahmad Zia Massoud, Mohammad Mohaqiq, and others. The opposition, by then splintered into several parties, warned that Karzai's appeasement policy could come at the cost of Afghanistan's political and economic development, including the progress made in areas such as education and women's rights. Because NATO excluded the Karzai administration and the opposition leaders were excluded from secret talks with the Taliban, Karzai's political rhetoric was increasingly adjusted to Taliban demands, United Front leaders, and in late 2011, regrouped to oppose a return of the Taliban to Afghanistan.

== Legacy ==
Between 1996 and 2001, the Northern Alliance blocked the Taliban and al-Qaeda from gaining control of the entirety of Afghanistan. Many internally displaced persons found shelter in areas controlled by Ahmad Shah Massoud. After the September 2001 attacks in the United States, U.S. air raids followed by ground troops of the United Front ousted the Taliban from power in Kabul. Between November and December 2001, the United Front gained control of most major Afghan cities. Had it not been for the United Front, the U.S. would have needed to deploy large number of ground troops, as was done in the Iraq War.

The United Front was influential in the transitional Afghan Government of Hamid Karzai from 2001 until 2004. Notably, Mohammed Fahim became the Vice President and Defense Minister, Yunus Qanuni became the Minister of Education and Security Advisor and Abdullah Abdullah became the Foreign Minister. Most foreign observers expected this dominance to continue and for Fahim or Qanuni to be selected as Karzai's Vice President in the 2004 elections. However, Karzai instead selected Ahmad Zia Massoud, younger brother of the former United Front leader Ahmad Shah Massoud. Karzai easily won the 2004 Presidential election with 55.4% of the vote, followed by three former leaders of the Northern Alliance, Quanuni (16.3%), Mohaqiq (11.7%) and Dostum (10%).

Some of the military strength of the UIF has now been absorbed into the military of Afghanistan, while many of the remaining soldiers were disarmed through a nationwide disarmament program. The existence and strength of the Afghan National Army has significantly reduced the threat of the former UIF elements attempting to use military action against the new NATO-backed Afghan government. Most of the country's senior military personnel are former members of the UIF, including Defense Minister Bismillah Khan Mohammadi.

Some members of the alliance are now part of the United National Front (Afghanistan) which is led by Rabbani and includes some former leaders of the UIF such as Yunus Qanuni, Mohammed Fahim, and Abdul Rashid Dostum. The United National Front has positioned itself as a "loyal" opposition to Hamid Karzai. Others like Abdul Rasul Sayyaf claim to be loyal to Hamid Karzai while, however, following their own agenda.

Abdullah Abdullah, a doctor of medicine and one of Ahmad Shah Massoud's closest friends, ran as an independent candidate in the 2009 Afghan presidential election and came in second place. On November 1, 2009, Abdullah, however, quit the runoff election because of widespread allegations of election fraud. Some of his followers wanted to take to the streets but Abdullah called for calm. Massoud Khalili, another of Ahmad Shah Massoud's close friends, became ambassador to India and subsequently to Turkey, while the younger brother of Massoud, Ahmad Wali Massoud, serves as ambassador to the United Kingdom. Massoud's ex-commander Bismillah Khan Mohammadi was chief-of-staff of the Afghan National Army, then as Minister of the Interior followed by Minister of Defense. One of Massoud's close intelligence agents, Amrullah Saleh, became director of the National Directorate of Security (NDS) in 2004 but had to resign in 2010.

=== Reformation (2011) ===
The National Front of Afghanistan, which was created by Ahmad Zia Massoud, Abdul Rashid Dostum and Mohammad Mohaqiq in late 2011 to oppose peace talks with Taliban, is generally considered as a reformation of the military wing of the United Front. Meanwhile, much of the political wing has reunited under the National Coalition of Afghanistan led by Abdullah Abdullah.

Former head of the National Directorate of Security (NDS), Amrullah Saleh, created a new movement, Basej-i Milli, with support among the youth. It mobilized about 10,000 people in an anti-Taliban demonstration in the capital Kabul in May 2011. Former Northern Alliance strongman Mohammed Fahim, Vice President of Afghanistan, remained in an alliance with Hamid Karzai until Fahim's death in 2014.

=== 2021 resurgence ===
Following a takeover of Kabul and much of Afghanistan by the Taliban in 2021, the National Resistance Front of Afghanistan, led by Ahmad Massoud, son of late Afghan politician Ahmad Shah Massoud, and Vice President Amrullah Saleh started gathering strength in the Panjshir Valley. The flag of the 'Northern Alliance' or the United Islamic Front for the Salvation of Afghanistan was hoisted for the first time since 2001 in the Panjshir Valley, signalling their return.

== Human rights issues (1996–2001) ==
Ahmad Shah Massoud (right) with Pashtun anti-Taliban leader Abdul Qadir (left) in November 2000

The human rights situation during combat was heavily dependent on the specific commander and his troops. The situation for different leaders and their troops of the United Front thus shows sharp contrasts. Also, the quality of life of the Afghan population was heavily dependent on the specific leader that was directly controlling the area in which they lived. Sharp contrasts could also be witnessed regarding life and structures in those areas.

=== Area of Ahmad Shah Massoud ===
Ahmad Shah Massoud controlled the Panjshir area, some other parts of Parwan and Takhar province. Some parts of Badakshan were under his influence while others were controlled by Burhanuddin Rabbani. Badakshan was the home region of Rabbani.

Massoud created institutions which were structured into several committees: political, health, education and economic. In the area ruled by Massoud, women and girls were allowed to work and to go to school, and in at least two known instances Massoud personally intervened against cases of forced marriage. Women also did not have to wear the Afghan burqa. While it was Massoud's stated conviction that men and women are equal and should enjoy the same rights, he also had to deal with Afghan traditions which he said would need a generation or more to overcome. In his opinion that could only be achieved through education.

Hundreds of thousands of Afghans fled from the Taliban to the areas controlled by Massoud. There was a huge humanitarian problem as there was not enough to eat for both the existing population and the internally displaced Afghans. In 2001, Massoud and a French journalist described the bitter situation of the displaced people and asked for humanitarian help.

=== Area of Abdul Rashid Dostum ===
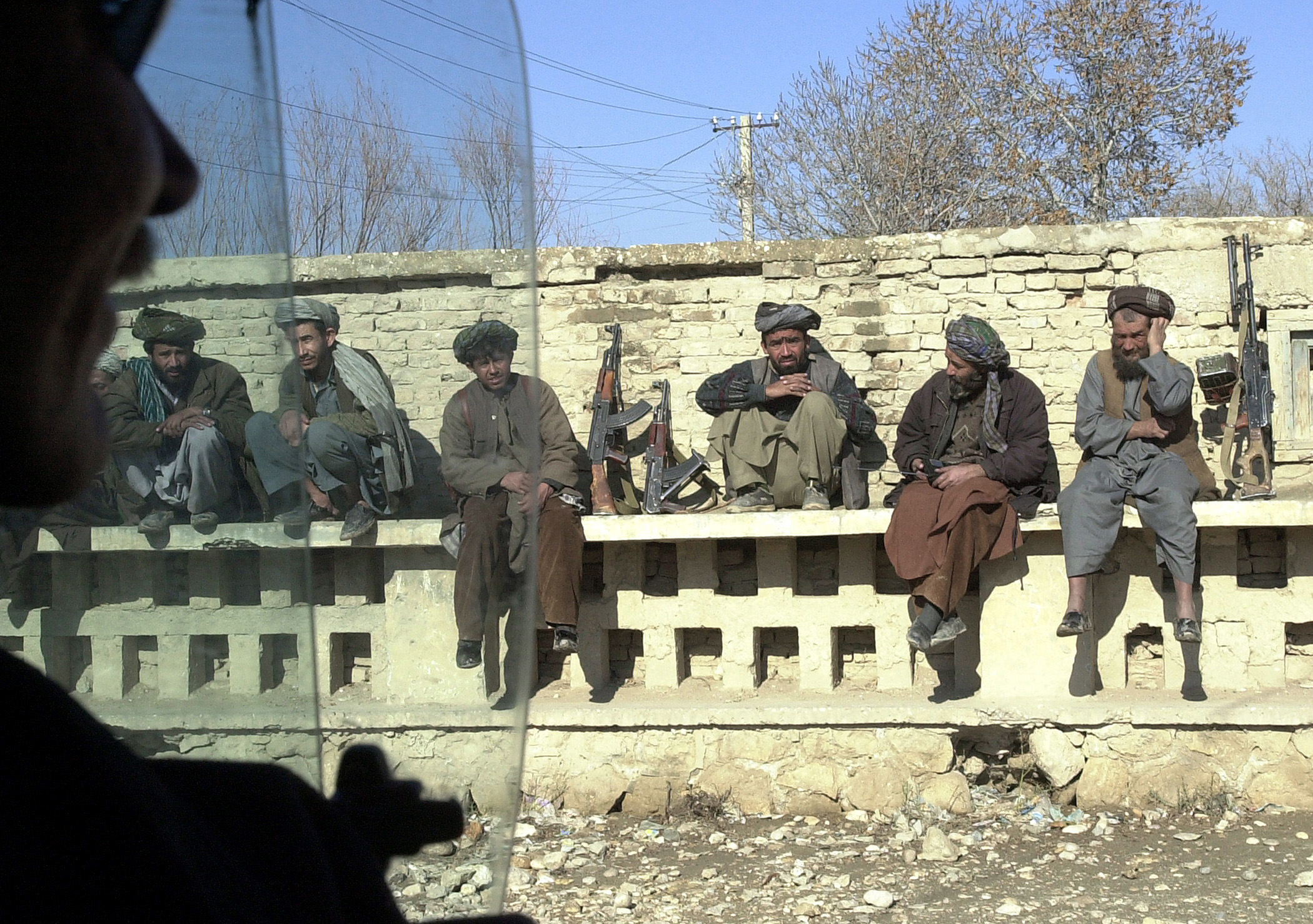
Northern Alliance troops under General Dostum's command in Mazar-e Sharif, December 2001

Until the conquest of Balkh by the Taliban in 1998, Abdul Rashid Dostum controlled the following provinces: Samangan, Balkh, Jowzjan, Faryab, and Baghlan provinces. According to Human Rights Watch many of the violations of international humanitarian law committed by the United Front forces date from 1996–1998 when Dostum controlled most of the north.

According to Human Rights Watch in 1997, some 3,000 captured Taliban soldiers were summarily executed in and around Mazar-i Sharif by Dostum's Junbish-i Milli forces under the command of Abdul Malik Pahlawan. The killings followed Malik's withdrawal from a brief alliance with the Taliban and the capture of the Taliban forces who were trapped in the city. With the U.S. War on Terror, troops loyal to Dostum also returned to combat. In December 2001, during the U.S. invasion of Afghanistan, between 250 and 3,000 (depending on sources) Taliban prisoners were shot and/or suffocated to death in metal truck containers. The prisoners were killed while being transferred from Kunduz to Sheberghan. This became known as the Dasht-i-Leili massacre. In 2009, Dostum denied the accusations.

Dostum belonged to those commanders making their own, often draconian, laws. Human Rights Watch has released documents alleging widespread crimes targeted against the civilian population. Human Rights Watch asked to actively discourage and refuse support in any way to any group or coalition that includes commanders with a record of serious violations of international humanitarian law standards, specifically naming Abdul Rashid Dostum; Muhammad Mohaqiq, a senior commander of the Hezb-e Wahdat; Abdul Rasul Sayyaf, leader of the erstwhile Ittehad-e Islami; and Abdul Malik Pahlawan, a former senior Junbish-i Milli commander.

== See also ==
- War in Afghanistan (1996–2001)
- War in Afghanistan (2001–2021)
- National Resistance Front of Afghanistan
