= Mohammed Zaman =

Afghan politician and military commander (1965–2010)

Hajji Mohammed Zaman (29 April 1965 – 22 February 2010), also known as Zaman Ghamsharik, was an Afghan military leader and politician. He was an ethnic Pashtun from the Khogyani tribe. According to Maj. Dalton Fury, who fought together with Ghamsharik in November/December 2001 in the Tora Bora campaign against the Taliban, Haji Zaman had been "one of the more infamous mujahideen junior commanders during the Soviet–Afghan War. When the Taliban took over, Zaman departed Afghanistan for France. When the Taliban fell from grace after 9/11, he returned to his homeland to reclaim his former VIP status. He was said to have had influential friends in neighboring Pakistan, including members of the Pakistan intelligence service. He reportedly led a force of 4,000 men during the campaign to oust Afghanistan's Soviet occupiers.

During the initial years of the Taliban's administration of Afghanistan, some sources claim Zaman led resistance fighters from bases in Pakistan against Taliban rule.

In 1997, the government of Pakistan forced him to leave Pakistan. Haji Zaman spent the remaining years of the Taliban's rule of Afghanistan, (i.e., until shortly after the 9/11/01 WTC attack), in Dijon, France.

Following the September 11 attacks, and subsequent confirmation that Osama Bin Laden was behind the attack, the US demanded Taliban leader Mullah Omar to turn over Bin Laden or face US invasion. Mullah Omar refused to surrender Bin Laden, so the US planned military action as described in CIA officers Gary Berntsen's Jawbreaker, and Gary Schroen's First In. Haji Zaman returned from France to Afghanistan (reportedly at the invitation of the US CIA, as a counterbalance to another Afghan warlord/partner Hazret Ali) and joined with other regional and tribal leaders from the Nangarhar and Khowst provinces to form the Eastern Shura.

The Eastern Shura, of which Haji Zaman was a key member, were early backers of the first post-Taliban President Hamid Karzai.

Karzai later appointed Haji Mohammad Zaman Ghamsharik as deputy Chief of Police for Nangarhar Province.

Haji Mohammed Zaman Ghamsharik was killed on 22 February 2010 in a suicide bombing, while addressing refugees in Khogyani District, Nangarhar Province.
