= Hazrat Ali (Afghan politician) =

Afghan military commander and politician (born 1964)

- Born: Ali; 1964 (age 61–62); Kabul, Afghanistan
- Occupations: Warlord, Politician
- Employer: Politician
- Height: 6’3
- Title: Pashayi
- Political party: Jameiat-e Islami
- Children: Ahmad Ali

Hazrat Ali is an Afghan politician and former military leader. He previously served as a military commander for the Northern Alliance in eastern Afghanistan.

== Biography ==
Ali was born in 1964 in Kabul to an ethnic Pashayi family. He rose to prominence during the Soviet occupation of Afghanistan. As a commander for Hezb-e Islami Khalis, he quickly became an important leader for the Pashai community. Hazrat Ali has also been described as an Afghan Army commander under the government of the Democratic Republic of Afghanistan. He fled Afghanistan to live in Mashad, Iran, where he is believed to have married an Iranian woman.

During the war against the Taliban, Ali is said to have been aligned with Ahmad Shah Massoud. Following the fall of the Taliban Ali joined with two other leaders in the Jalalabad-Tora Bora region, Abdul Qadir and Mohammed Zaman to set up the Eastern Shura, a local provisional government. They were early backers of the first post-Taliban President Hamid Karzai.

The Asia Times reports that, after the fall of the Taliban, Ali's troops executed hundreds of captured Arab prisoners.

During late 2001 and early 2002 it was US policy to employ very few US ground troops, and to rely on air power and local allies, like Hazrat Ali to defeat al Qaeda. The Asia Times reports that Ali was one of the warlords who allowed Osama bin Laden to escape during the Battle of Tora Bora.

"By the time the merciless American B-52 bombing raids were about to begin, Bin Laden had already left Tora Bora - as a number of Afghan mujaheddin confirmed to Asia Times Online at the time. They said they had seen him on the other side of the frontline in late November. Hazrat Ali, the warlord and then so-called minister of "law and order" in the Eastern Shura (traditional decision-making council) in Afghanistan, was outsourced by the Pentagon to go after Bin Laden and Al-Qaeda in Tora Bora. He bagged a handful of suitcases full of cash. He put on a show for the cameras. And significantly, he was barely in touch with the few Special Forces on the ground."

The Pak Tribune described Ali as a "gangster" during the 2004 Afghan Presidential election. He and his private army have been accused of accumulating illegal weapons, drug trafficking and opium trade, criminal intimidation, land seizures for builders, looting and sexually assaulting women, for which Ali is under Human Rights Watch monitor.

Hamid Karzai appointed Hazrat Ali as the Jalalabad police chief in 2003 and sacked him in 2004 due to connection with Taliban and other militant groups. He got a seat in the Wolesi Jirga of the National Assembly of Afghanistan in the 2005 Afghan parliamentary election, representing Nangarhar Province. In May 2012, it was reported that Iran was providing millions of dollars to Ali for the purpose of blocking the National Assembly's approval of the Afghan-US strategic cooperation agreement. However, the next day the agreement was approved by the majority and the following day Ali denied the allegations.

=== Guantanamo detainees who served under Hazrat Ali ===
Guantanamo detainee Anwar Khan told his Administrative Review Board that he had fought against the Taliban, under the over-all command of Hazrat Ali. He claimed he had been arrested, and sent to Guantanamo when he was stopped at an American checkpoint and the soldiers were confused as to why he was carrying multiple ID cards.

Guantanamo detainee Awal Gul had worked, reluctantly, for the Taliban, in administrative positions. He told his Tribunal of making multiple attempts to resign from the positions the Taliban had appointed him to. When the Taliban started to fall he took his chance and enlisted in Hazrat Ali's forces. However, a few months later, Ali forced him to surrender himself to American forces.
