= Surobi, Nangarhar =

Community in Nangarhar Province, Afghanistan

Sorubi (Pashto: سوروبي) is a community in the southern corner of Rodat District, Nangarhar Province, Afghanistan.

The New York Times reports that one of the leaders of the Eastern Shura, a provisional government set up in Nangarhar Province on November 16, 2001, after the Taliban retreated, was the leader of an anti-Taliban militia, from Sorubi, named Ezatullah.

== See also ==
- Nangarhar Province
