= Eastern Shura =

Afghan military alliance

Eastern Shura was an alliance of regional and tribal leaders to oust the Taliban in Khowst Province and Nangarhar Province, during the War in Afghanistan. Mary Anne Weaver, writing in The New York Times on the fourth anniversary of al Qaeda's attacks on September 11, 2001, described the formation of the Eastern Shura as the result of surrender negotiations on November 13, 2001, between Mohammad Yunus Khalis and Osama bin Laden.

Eastern Shura leaders
name	notes
Haji Abdul Qadeer	Former governor of Nangarhar Province, prior to the Taliban regime.; Close ties to the family of Mohammed Zahir Shah, the last king of Afghanistan.; Went to the Bonn Conference to endorse the choice of Hamid Karzai as leader of the Afghan Transitional Administration.; Assassinated in July 2002.
Hazrat Ali	Based in Towr Kham, a small town, in Nangarhar Province, on the border with Pakistan.; Speculation links him to the drug trade, and to bribes that enabled Al-Qaeda and the Taliban's leadership to escape Tora Bora.; Reported to have allowed Osama bin Laden to escape from Tora Bora.
Ezatullah	A local leader of an anti-Taliban militia, from Sorubi, set up a provisional government in Nangarhar Province on November 16, 2001, after the Taliban retreated. The two other leaders in the provisional government were Hazrati Ali from Towr Kham and Mawlawi Mohammad Yunus Khalis from the Provincial capital, Jalalabad.
Hajji Mohammed Zaman	The Shura's "Defense Chief".; Hamid Karzai appointed Zaman Deputy Chief of Police for Nangarhar Province.
Rostom Sherzad	Brought 120 fighters to the alliance.
Haji Zaman Ghamsharik	Reported to have allowed Osama bin Laden to escape from Tora Bora.; Reported to have been "lured from exile" in France, by the USA.
Pir Baksh Gardiwal	The Eastern Shura's "Intelligence Chief".
Haji Hayat Ullah	
Sher Gulan	Lead one of the pincer movements intended to capture Osama bin Laden as he escaped from Tora Bora in December 2001.; Had authority in Noorgal, Kunar.
