= Taj (name) =

Taj is a unisex given name meaning "crown" in Persian, Sanskrit, and Arabic. Notable people with the name include:

== People ==
=== Given name ===
- Taj Muhammad Afridi (died 2026), Pakistani politician
- Taj ul-Alam (1612–1675), sultan of Aceh
- Taj Mahmood Amroti (1857–1929), Indian scholar, fighter against British control of India, and educationalist
- Taj Annan (born 2003), Australian rugby league footballer
- Taj Atwal, British actress
- Taj Bibi (born 1946), Pakistani politician
- Taj Bradley (born 2001), American baseball player
- Taj al-Muluk Buri (died 1132), Turkoman atabeg of Damascus
- Taj Burrow (born 1978), Australian surfer
- Taj al-Daula, Buyid ruler of Khuzestan
- Taj al-Dawlah, Qajar royal
- Taj ol-Dowleh (died 1881), Iranian royal
- Taj Faqih (1130–??), Arab Islamic scholar, theologian, and Sufi saint
- Taj Farrant (born 2009), Australian Guitar Prodigy
- Taj Forer (born 1981), American photographer
- Taj Gibson (born 1985), American basketball player
- Taj Gray (born 1984), American basketball player
- Taj Haider (1942-2025), Pakistani politician
- Taj Hashmi (born 1948), Bangladeshi academic and writer
- Taj Hotton (born 2006), Australian rules footballer
- Taj Jackson (born 1973), American singer, songwriter, producer, and director
- Taj Muhammad Jamali (died 2009), Pakistani politician
- Taj Mir Jawad, Afghan politician
- Taj Jones (born 2000), Australian cyclist
- Taj Mohammad Jr., Pakistani footballer
- Taj Khan Kalash, Pakistani ethnic minority activist
- Taj Mohammad Khairi (born 1942), Afghan wrestler
- Taj Khan (1820–1904), Indian and Nepali Hindustani classical musician
- Taj Khatoon (1400–1468), Empress consort of Kashmir
- Taj Muhammad Khattak (born 1948), Pakistani Navy officer
- Taj Mahal (born 1942), American blues musician
- Taj Yasin Maimoen (born 1983), Indonesian politician
- Taj Bibi Bilqis Makani (1573–1619), Empress consort in the Mughal Empire
- Taj Malik (born 1975), Afghan cricketer and coach
- Taj Muhammad Mallah, Pakistani politician
- Taj Matthews (born 1976), American journalist and author
- Taj McGowan (born 1997), American football player
- Taj McWilliams (born 1970), American basketball player
- Taj Mihelich (born 1973), American cyclist
- Taj Mohammed (Guantanamo Bay detainee) (born 1981), Afghan Guantanamo detainee
- Taj Mohiuddin (born 1945), Indian politician
- Taj ol-Molouk (died 1909), Iranian royal
- Taj Muhammad (politician), Pakistani politician
- Taj al-Mulk (died 1093), Seljuk courtier
- Taj Nehar (born 1997), Bangladeshi cricketer
- Taj Noor, Indian film score and soundtrack composer
- Taj Pabari, British born Australian based entrepreneur
- Taj Sangara (born 1992), American-born Canadian footballer
- Taj Sehrai (1921–2002), Pakistani author and archaeologist
- Taj Smith (born 1983), American football player
- Taj Mohammad Sr. (1924–??), Pakistani footballer
- Taj Stansberry, American director and photographer
- Taj Wali (born 1991), Pakistani cricketer
- Taj Mohammad Wardak, Afghan politician
- Taj Wasan (born 1988), Pakistani first-class cricketer
- Taj Williams (born 1993), American football player
- Taj Woewodin (born 2003), Australian rules footballer
- Taj al-Dawla Ziyar (died 1333), Baduspanid ruler of Rustamdar

=== Surname ===
- Ali Baba Taj (born 1977), Pakistani poet
- Layla Taj, American Egyptian dancer
- Nadeem Taj (born 1953), Pakistani intelligence chief

== Fictional characters ==
- Kamar-Taj, in Marvel Universe
- Taj Coppin, in Neighbours

== See also ==
- Taj al-Din (disambiguation)
- Taj al-Islam (disambiguation)
- Taj Mohammed (disambiguation)
