= Hedayat Amin Arsala =

Afghan economist and politician (1942–2025)

- هدايت امين ارسلا
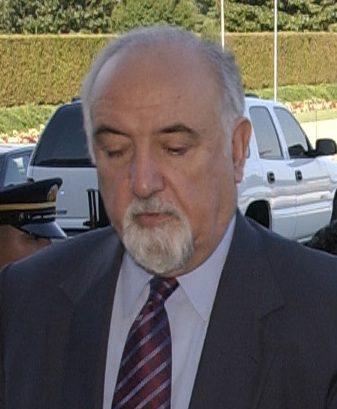
- Arsala at The Pentagon in 2003
- Born: 12 January 1942; Kabul, Afghanistan
- Died: 1 November 2025 (aged 83); United States
- Resting place: Virginia, United States
- Education: Southern Illinois University (BA, MA); George Washington University (PhD)
- Occupation: Politician
- Employer: Government of Afghanistan
- Political party: National Islamic Front of Afghanistan

Hedayat Amin Arsala (Pashto: هدايت امين ارسلا; 12 January 1942 – 1 November 2025) was an Afghan economist and politician. He served as Vice President of Afghanistan, Finance Minister and Foreign Minister, and until October 2013 was the Senior Minister of the Islamic Republic of Afghanistan, appointed by the President Hamid Karzai.

== Early life and education ==
An ethnic Pashtun, Arsala grew up in Kabul, Afghanistan, where he attended high school. The powerful family Arsala originated from the Nangarhar Province, with his cousins Haji Abdul Qadeer, Din Mohammad and Abdul Haq and his ancestors Wazir Arsala Khan and Aminullah Khan also stemming from this family. He completed his BA and MA in Economics, also focusing on international relations, at Southern Illinois University in the United States of America. He also completed the course work and qualifying exams for a PhD in Economics at George Washington University, in Washington, D.C. In May 2008, Southern Illinois University conferred an honorary doctorate on Arsala for his distinguished services to Afghanistan.

== Career ==
In 1969, Arsala was the first Afghan to join the World Bank (WB) through the Young Professional Program. He served there for 18 years in several economic and senior operational posts. Active in the resistance against the Soviet occupation since 1979, he left the WB in 1987 to participate full-time in the Afghan struggle. He was a founding member of the National Islamic Front of Afghanistan (NIFA), led by Pir Sayed Ahmad Gailani and a member of the Supreme Council of Mujahideen Unity (formed in February 1980). He served as the Finance Minister in the Afghan Interim Government (AIG) in exile from 1989 to 1992.

When the Soviets withdrew and there was a subsequent regime change in Afghanistan, Arsala was appointed the Foreign Minister of the newly formed Mujahideen coalition government in early 1993. He withdrew from that post in 1995 due to infighting and political disagreement amongst some Mujahideen groups.

With the rise of the Taliban, Arsala, with some compatriots, launched a peace campaign which called for a broad-based interim Government through a Loya Jirga. This peace movement, later known as 'The Rome Group' and its key members, including Arsala, were key participants in the Bonn deliberations after 11 September 2001. The Bonn Conference resulted in the Bonn Agreement and the formation of the Interim Afghan Administration. Mr. Hamid Karzai was appointed Chairman and Mr. Arsala Vice Chairman and the first Minister of Finance in post-Taliban Afghanistan. The Bonn Conference also provided a roadmap for subsequent political developments. In June 2002, the Transitional Government of Afghanistan was formed. The Emergency Loya Jirga of Afghanistan elected Hamid Karzai as President and Mr. Arsala was appointed as Vice President of Afghanistan.

As Vice-President (VP), Arsala simultaneously headed the Independent Administrative Reform and Civil Service Commission. He also chaired the Economic Coordination Council and the National Census Committee. He was a member of the National Security Council and at times, in Mr. Karzai's absence, Acting President. After 2.5 years as VP, Arsala was appointed Senior Advisor to the President as well as the Minister for Commerce and Industry. In 2006, he became the Senior Minister of the Islamic Republic of Afghanistan and in the latter part of 2008, he simultaneously became the Chairman of the Government Coordination Committee (GCC) and served as the Co-Chair of the Joint Coordination and Monitoring Board.

== Accomplishments ==
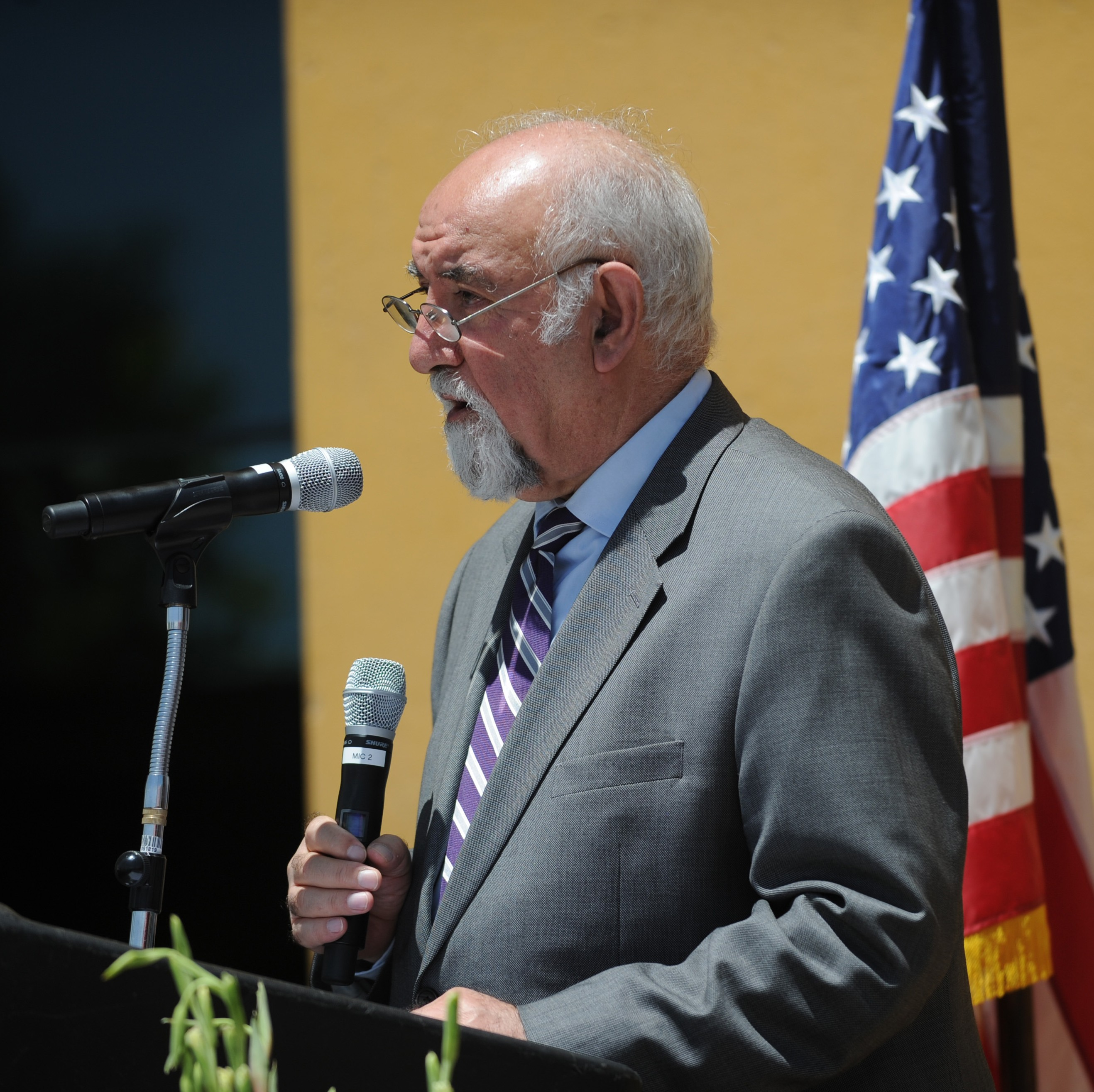
Arsala speaking at the U.S. Embassy in Kabul, Afghanistan in 2011

As the first Minister of Finance in the post-Taliban regime, Arsala:

- Introduced the first Afghan budget and enforced fiscal discipline by stopping the finance of Government expenditure through Central Bank borrowing.
- Initiated the discussions with the International Monetary Fund (IMF) on introducing the new Afghan currency.
- Led an increase in Government revenue by 60% above IMF projections.

In early 2002, Arsala also co-chaired the first international Afghanistan aid and development conference in Tokyo. Later in the same year, he led the first international aid conference in Afghanistan. He pioneered a number of innovative civil service initiatives aimed at improving the public sector and effective governance within Afghanistan, creating the first Independent Administration Reform and civil service Commission to reform government institutions and introducing a system of civil service appointments and promotion on the basis of merit rather than patronage or nepotism. A champion of public sector reform and private sector growth, as Minister of Commerce and Industry he introduced a number of important improvements to remove barriers to the private sector and champion increased investment:

- Bringing the majority of state revenue sources within the Ministry's remit – previously pilfered by officials and political groups – under Government control.
- Drafting new laws on commerce, economic activities and institutions, signing numerous bilateral trade and investment guarantee agreements.
- Accelerating the process of Afghanistan's accession to the World Trade Organisation, subsequently formalised.
- Initiating reform of the Chamber of Commerce and Industries and creating an Export Promotion Agency.
- Overseeing a 60% increase in annual exports to US$500 million.

During Arsala's tenure, exports increased from US$300 million to US$500 million. He represented Afghanistan at several international conferences including those of Heads of State and Governments.

== Death ==
Arsala died on 1 November 2025, at the age of 83.

It was announced that he would be buried in Virginia on 6 November.
