= Tora Bora Military Front =

Organization

Tora Bora Nizami Mahaz
- Founder: Anwar ul Haq Mujahid
- Founded: 2006
- Split from: Hezb-e Islami Khalis
- Country: Afghanistan
- Allegiance: Islamic Emirate of Afghanistan (since 2016)
- Ideology: Islamic fundamentalism Tribalism; Pashtunwali; Khogyani tribe interests Pro-Taliban
- Part of: (Afghanistan) Taliban (from 2016)

The Tora Bora Military Front (Pashto: د تورا بورا نظامي جبهه) is an insurgent group in Nangarhar Province, Afghanistan. It is led by Anwarul Haq Mujahid. The faction broke away from Hezb-e Islami Khalis (HiK) following the death of HiK's leader Mohammad Yunus Khalis and an ensuing power struggle between Mujahid and Haji Din Mohammad.

In 2016, Anwar ul Haq pledged allegiance to the leadership of the Taliban.

The organization has published a magazine and website.
