= Nasrullah Baryalai Arsalai =

Afghan politician (born 1958)

Nasrullah Baryalay Arsalai
- Born: March 3, 1958
- Occupations: Politician, Tribal Elder, Businessman
- Known for: Presidential Candidate, Abdul Haq Foundation

Haji Nasrullah Baryalai Arsalai (born 3 March 1958) is an Afghan politician, who was a candidate during Afghanistan's 2009 Presidential election.

== Life ==
Haji Nasrullah Arsalai, known as Baryalai (victorious), is from a distinguished Afghan family with a long record of service. Their forefather Arsala Khan was Foreign Minister of Afghanistan under king Amir Sher Ali and was a leader of resistance to the British in the Second Anglo-Afghan War. Since the end of the jihad, he has developed a series of businesses in Afghanistan. Abroad he has worked as a community organiser. He is not a militia leader.

He is the brother of former legendary commander Abdul Haq who was executed by the Taliban in 2001. He is also the brother of former Vice President and Governor of Nangarhar Haji Abdul Qadir and of the current governor of Kabul Haji Din Mohammad.

== Political activities ==
In 1980, Arsalai joined his brother Abdul Haq to help organize underground resistance cells against the Soviet occupation and its Afghan collaborators in Nangarhar and Kabul. In 1981, he migrated to Germany as a refugee and began conducting political activities in support of the jihad against the Soviets. This involved establishing the Hezb-e Islami (Khalis) office in Germany and editing a newspaper "Al hijrat o al jihad." He conducted multiple fact-finding missions around Pakistan and Afghanistan during the period of Soviet occupation until 1989.

In February 1989, Arsalai participated as a delegate in the Rawalpindi shura to select the mujahideen's interim government. From 1989–1991, he served as political and cultural aide to Commander Abdul Haq, based in Peshawar. He ran the administration of the resistance front, published a weekly review of political and military developments and maintained his political contacts with Afghans and the diplomatic community. In this role, Arsalai also ran the administration for an important mujahideen initiative, the nationwide shura of mujahideen commanders, sar ta sari.

From 1993–1994, Arsalai ran the Liaison Office of Eastern Afghanistan in Peshawar, an Afghan initiative to coordinate humanitarian assistance to the east of the country during a period when Haji Abdul Qadir headed the administration in Jalalabad. Appalled by the factional fighting among the mujahideen groups and the eventual rise of the Taliban, Arsalai returned to Germany in 1994, where he established a successful family business in Germany. He worked full time on his business until 26 October 2001, the day that Abdul Haq was killed by the Taliban for organizing uprisings against them.

From 2002–2009, Arsalai was chief organizer of the People's Advisory Shura (Wolesi Mashvurati Shura), a mass movement of people in Nangarhar and Eastern Afghanistan aimed to mobilize popular participation in the Bonn political process. Significant achievements of this movement included organizing the consultations in Eastern Afghanistan on drafting of the constitution (2003), facilitating recruitment to the new Afghan National Army and opposing opium cultivation. In 2002, he established a monthly newspaper Afghan Yawwalay (Afghan Unity).

Haji Nasrullah Arsalai is fluent in Pashto, Dari, English and German.

In his 2009 Presidential candidacy his running mates were Abdul Baqi Turkistani and Sayed Mohammad Alam. Nasrullah withdrew, and asked his supporters to vote for Abdullah Abdullah, who ended up ranking second.
