= Angola–Ukraine relations =

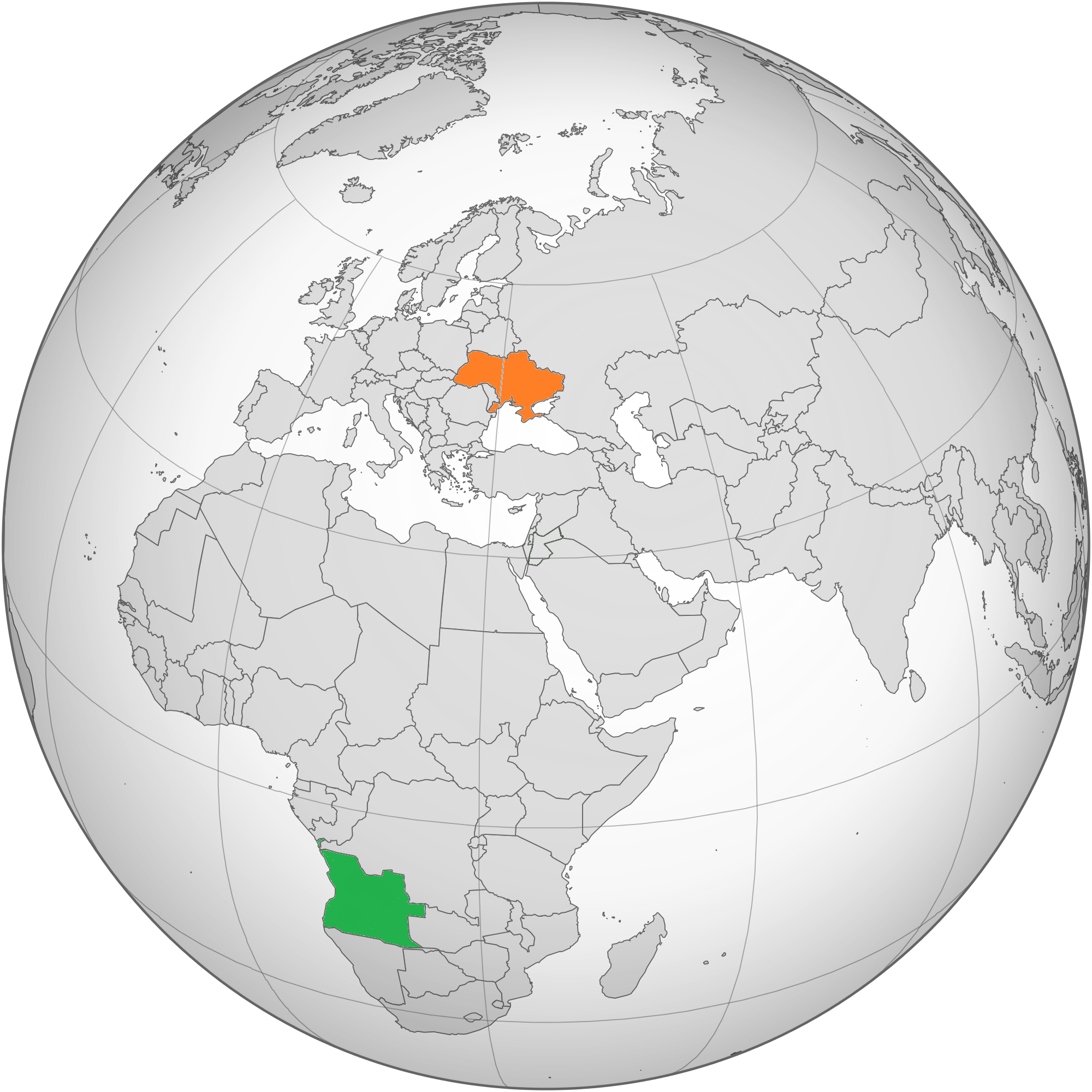
- Angola: Ukraine

Diplomatic mission
- None: Embassy of Ukraine, Luanda

Angola–Ukraine relations refers to the bilateral relations between Angola and Ukraine.

== History ==
On September 30, 1993, The Republic of Angola recognized Ukrainian independence, and diplomatic relations were established a year later on September 30, 1994.

=== UN Peacekeeping in Angola ===
Following independence in 1991, Ukraine considers its participation in international peacekeeping operations as an important facet of its foreign policy. In February 1996, Ukraine stationed peacekeepers in Angola as part of the UN Angola Verification Mission III (UNAVM III), numbering around 7,000 servicemen.

The main Ukrainian forces were from the 91st Engineering Regiment, who were responsible for building pontoon bridges. However, as neither party in conflict wanted connections for fear of weapons transport, many of these bridges were soon destroyed by either side.

The original mission was supposed to last a year, with personnel rotation after 6 months. However, the UN reformed the mission and the Ukrainian servicemen were withdrawn by November 1996, three months earlier than planned.

During the Ukrainian mission to Angola, the Armed Forces of Ukraine gained vital experience in military operation, including in the reconciliation process between different military factions and the monitoring process for implementing the agreed ceasefire. They also coordinated the supply of humanitarian aid in conflict zones.

=== Postwar Reconstruction ===
On May 13, 2004, Ukraine opened its embassy in Luanda. At the time, the Angolan Civil War had just concluded two years earlier, and Angola was focused on maintaining social stability and facilitating economic reconstruction. The Ukrainian embassy provided assistance to Ukrainians in Angola, and helped facilitate business contacts and cooperation between the two countries.

Important areas of bilateral cooperation include: agro-industrial complex; involvement of Ukrainian specialists in geological research; cooperation in the mining industry, including training personnel for this industry; education; military-technical cooperation; medicine and healthcare.

== Diplomatic missions ==
The Embassy of Ukraine in Angola has temporarily suspended its consular functions. Consular services are provided by the Embassy of Ukraine in the Republic of South Africa.

== Ambassadors ==
=== Ukraine to Angola ===
- Volodymyr Lakomov (2004–2007), Ambassador
- Volodymyr Kohno
- Volodymyr Boholyubov
- Oleksandr Nykonenko (2013-2014), Ambassador
- Pavlo Kostetskyi
