= Matiul Haq Khalis =

Afghan Taliban leader

Mawlawi Matiul Haq Khalis مولوی مطیع الحق خالص

President of the Afghan Red Crescent Society
- In office 4 October 2021 – 7 July 2024
- Emir: Hibatullah Akhundzada
- Preceded by: Syed Sifatullah Qureshi
- Succeeded by: Shahabuddin Delawar
- Prime Minister: Hasan Akhund
- Deputy President: Nooruddin Turabi

Personal details
- Born: 1961 (age 64–65) Nakarkhel village of Khogyani district, Nangarhar province, Afghanistan
- Parent: Mohammad Yunus Khalis (father)
- Relatives: Anwar ul Haq Mujahid (brother)
- Education: Islamic University of Madinah; University of Punjab; Jamia Imdad-ul-Uloom Islamia Peshawar
- Profession: Islamic scholar Politician

Mawlawi Matiul Haq Khalis (born; 1961) (Pashto: مولوی مطیع الحق خالص) is the Afghan Taliban leader and the former President of the Afghan Red Crescent Society and currently the director of the National Environmental Protection Agency (NEPA) since July 2024.

== Early life and education ==
He was born in 1961 in Nakarkhel village of Khogyani district of Nangarhar province, Afghanistan. He is the son of a late Afghan jihad commander Mohammad Yunus Khalis. After studying early religious education from his father, he migrated to Pakistan in 1978 and studied in various madrassas in Khyber Pakhtunkhwa. In 1988 he received a Bachelor’s degree in Islamic law from the Islamic University of Madinah and a Master’s degree in Islamic studies from University of Punjab in Lahore, Pakistan. From 1990 to 1991 he studied Hadith at Jamia Imdad-ul-Uloom Islamia Peshawar. He is also a Hafiz-i-Quran

He and his brother Anwar ul Haq Mujahid led a group called the Tora Bora Military Front.
