= Taj Mohammed =

Taj Mohammed or Taj Mohammad may refer to:

- Taj Mohammed Sr. (born 1924), footballer who played for India during the 1948 Summer Olympics
- Taj Mohammad Amrothi (1857–1929), Indian Muslim scholar
- Taj Muhammad (politician) (Pakistani politician)
- Taj Mohammad Wardak, Afghan politician
- Taj Muhammad Jamali (died 2009), Pakistani politician
- Taj Mohammed (Guantanamo Bay detainee), Afghan shepherd, held five years in Guantanamo
- Taj Mohammad (Olympic wrestler), competed in the under 70 kg class for Pakistan at the 1968 Summer Olympics
