= Nooruddin Turabi =

Afghan politician

Mullah Nooruddin Turabi نورالدین ترابی

Deputy President of the Afghan Red Crescent Society
- Incumbent
- Assumed office 4 October 2021
- Leader: Hibatullah Akhundzada
- Prime Minister: Hasan Akhund
- President: Matiul Haq Khalis

Minister of Justice
- In office c. 1996 – c.2001
- Prime Minister: Mohammed Rabbani; Abdul Kabir
- Leader: Mohammed Omar
- Succeeded by: Abdul Hakim Ishaqzai (2021)

Personal details
- Born: 1959 (age 66–67)
- Occupation: Politician, Taliban member

Mullah Nooruddin Turabi (ملا نورالدین ترابي; born 1959) is an Afghan senior Taliban leader and current Deputy President of the Afghan Red Crescent Society. Turabi was Minister of Justice from 1996 to 2001 in the Taliban's previous government.
