= Haji Abdul Haq =

Afghan mujahideen commander (1958–2001)

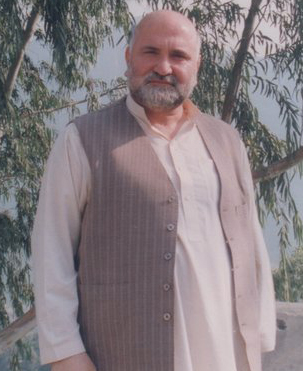
- Haq, c. 2000
- Born: Humayoun Arsala; April 23, 1958; Seydan, Nangarhar Province, Afghanistan
- Died: October 26, 2001 (aged 43); Rishkore, South of Kabul, Afghanistan
- Cause of death: Execution
- Relatives: Wazir Arsala Khan (paternal great-grandfather); Mohammed Aman (father); Hedayat Amin Arsala (cousin); Din Mohammad (brother); Hajji Abdul Qadir (brother)
- Military career
- Service years: 1977–2001
- Conflicts: Soviet–Afghan War

Haji Humayun Abdul Haq Arsala (23 April 1958 – 26 October 2001) was an Afghan military commander. A mujahideen leader who fought against the Soviet-backed People's Democratic Party of Afghanistan, the government in the 1980s, Haq later became a prominent leader of the Northern Alliance and was killed by the Taliban in October 2001 while trying to create a popular uprising against the Taliban in Afghanistan in the wake of the September 11 attacks.

== Early life ==
Haq was born in Seydan, Afghanistan, a small village in Nangarhar province, into a Pashtun family. He moved with his family to Helmand early on in his life. His father, Mohammed Aman, was the representative in Helmand for a Nangarhar construction company, and was relatively wealthy by Afghan standards. His family was well connected, part of the Arsala Khel family, which is a part of the Jabar Khel (a subtribe of the land-owning Ahmadzai tribe). They are all ethnic Pashtuns. His paternal great-grandfather, Wazir Arsala Khan, had once been the foreign minister of Afghanistan; a cousin, Hedayat Arsala, was a World Bank director working in Washington, D.C. who later became Vice President of Afghanistan in Hamid Karzai's administration.

Haq also had two older brothers (Haji Din Mohammad and Abdul Qadir), and one younger brother (Nasrullah Baryalai Arsalai). An early backer of Hamid Karzai, Abdul Qadir was rewarded with a cabinet position before he was assassinated in 2002. Haji Din Muhammad is the leader of the Hezb-e Islami Khalis party.

By his own account, Haq was an unruly child, who after persuading his father to register him for school at the early age of five, once hit a teacher who was sleeping on the job. A year after that his 51-year-old father died of kidney disease, prompting Din Mohammad to assume leadership of the family, and prompting the family to move back to their extended family in Nangarhar.

Back in Fatehabad, Haq began attending a Madrasah under the tutelage of local mullahs, and upon reaching the age of eight began studying at the Lycée. It was here that he started challenging the Communist ideology of some of his teachers.

== Mujahideen years ==
Haq first engaged in the fight against the Afghan government in 1978, initially without external support, then with the Hizb-i-Islami faction led by Mohammad Yunus Khalis—not to be mistaken with the Hezb-i-Islami faction of Gulbuddin Hekmatyar. During the Soviet–Afghan War, Haq coordinated Mujahideen activities in the province of Kabul.

Haq also defended the use of long-range rockets against Kabul despite the fact that those rocket attacks were causing casualties among the civilians. Haq said:

I have to free my country. My advice to people is not to stay close to the government. If you do, it's your fault. We use poor rockets; we cannot control them. They sometimes miss. I don't care about people who live close to the Soviet Embassy, I feel sorry for them, but what can [I] do?

Haq was one of the CIA's few Afghan contacts in the early years of the war. Steve Coll wrote that he "grew to become Howard Hart's most important Afghan guide to the anti-Soviet war." Later in the 1980s he became a critic of Pakistan's Inter-Services Intelligence (ISI) and (after his relationship with them ended) the CIA. The CIA labelled him "Hollywood Haq"—the Hollywood Commander.

Haq was injured several times, including losing part of his right heel. Because of his injuries, he often fought battles against the Soviets on horseback.

== Post-war period ==
Haq was the cabinet minister for internal security in the Islamic State of Afghanistan which had been created by the peace and power-sharing agreement known as the Peshawar Accord after the fall of the communist Najibullah regime in April 1992. Gulbuddin Hekmatyar, who had been offered the position of prime minister, refused to share power with other parties and started a massive bombardment campaign against the capital Kabul. Hekmatyar's attacks led to a prolonged war in Afghanistan. Shortly after this Haq resigned as interior minister, left Afghanistan and settled in Dubai, where it was reported he became a successful merchant.

In 1998, he became a United Nations Peace Mediator.

In January 1999, unknown assailants killed Haq's watchman, entered his home, and murdered his wife and son in Hayatabad in Peshawar, Pakistan. Another of Haq's sons survived the raid.

== Northern Alliance ==
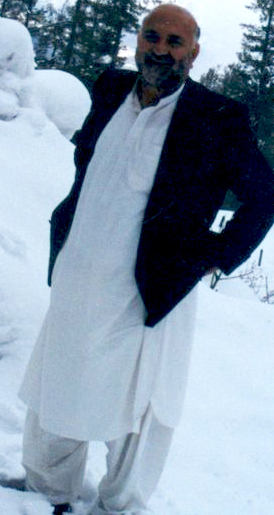
Haji Abdul Haq (pre-October 2001)

From 1999 onwards a process was set into motion by Ahmad Shah Massoud and Haq to unite the various ethnic group in Afghanistan against the Taliban regime. Massoud united the Tajiks, Hazara and Uzbeks as well as several Pashtun commanders. Besides meeting with Pashtun tribal leaders and acting as a point of reference, Haq received increasing numbers of Pashtun Taliban who secretly approached him. Some commanders who had worked for the Taliban military apparatus agreed to the plan to topple the Taliban regime as the Taliban lost support even among the Pashtuns.

Senior diplomat and Afghanistan expert Peter Tomsen hoped that "[t]he ‘Lion of Kabul’ [Abdul Haq] and the ‘Lion of Panjshir’ [Ahmad Shah Massoud] would make a formidable anti-Taliban team if they combined forces. Haq, Massoud, and Karzai, Afghanistan's three leading moderates, could transcend the Pashtun—non-Pashtun, north–south divide". The senior Hazara and Uzbek leaders took part in the process just like later Afghan president Hamid Karzai. They agreed to work under the banner of exiled Afghan King, Zahir Shah, who was residing in Rome, Italy.

In November 2000, leaders from all ethnic groups were brought together in Massoud's headquarters in northern Afghanistan travelling from other parts of Afghanistan, Europe, the United States, Pakistan and India to discuss a Loya Jirga for a settlement of Afghanistan's problems and to discuss the establishment of a post-Taliban government. In September 2001 an international official who met with representatives of the alliance would remark, "It's crazy that you have this today ... Pashtuns, Tajiks, Uzbeks, Hazara ... They were all ready to buy in to the process".

== Death ==
Following the US-led invasion of Afghanistan in October 2001, Haq entered Nangarhar Province of Afghanistan from Pakistan's Khyber Pakhtunkhwa province to implement his resistance plan against the Taliban. Some sources have speculated that the CIA supported this initiative but family members and other witness sources have denied this claim, writing that the CIA actually urged him not to enter Afghanistan. Former CIA director George Tenet reports that, at the recommendation of Bud McFarlane, CIA officials met with Haq in Pakistan and after assessing his capabilities urged him not to enter Afghanistan. After a chase, he was captured by the Taliban along with nineteen others between the towns of Hisarak and Azro in Nangarhar province, and was killed on October 26, 2001. The Guardian speculates that his capture was due to betrayal by double agents. Some reports soon after his death blamed the CIA for siding too closely with Pakistan's ISI, which did not wish to see Afghans united across ethnic lines, and for failing to intervene to rescue him from his Taliban captors. The veracity of this version of events was strengthened by reports of tension between Haq and American agents after an interview in which he stated "we cannot be [America's] puppet." He was one of many Afghan rebel leaders opposed to the U.S. intervention.

An obituary in The Guardian called Abdul Haq an "astute leader".

== Notes ==
=== References ===
- Coll, Steve (2004). Ghost Wars: the Secret History of the CIA, Afghanistan, and Bin Laden, from the Soviet Invasion to September 10, 2001. Penguin Press. ISBN 9781594200076.
- Kaplan, Robert D. (1990). Soldiers of God: With the Mujahidin in Afghanistan. Boston, MA: Houghton Mifflin Company. ISBN 0-395-52132-7.
- Tenet, George (2007). At the Center of the Storm: My Years at the CIA. HarperCollins.
- Tomsen, Peter (2011). Wars of Afghanistan. PublicAffairs. ISBN 9781586487638.
