= Anwar ul Haq Mujahid =

Afghan militant leader (born 1967)

Leader of Tora Bora Military Front

Personal details
- Born: 1967 (age 58–59) Nangarhar, Afghanistan
- Parent: Mohammad Yunus Khalis (father)
- Relatives: Matiul Haq Khalis (brother)

Military service
- Allegiance: Tora Bora Military Front; Hezb-e Islami Khalis (until 2006)
- Battles/wars: Afghanistan conflict (1978–present)

Anwar ul Haq Mujahid (Pashto: انوار الحق مجاهد) (born 1967, Nangarhar Province) is the son of deceased Afghan militant leader Mohammed Yunis Khalis, founder of the Hezb-e Islami Khalis. When Khalis died in 2006 his son took over the organization, but later transitioned to the Tora Bora Military Front. He was thought to have been arrested by the ISI during a raid in Peshawar in June 2009 and was released from internment later in 2012. On 22 August 2016 one of Taliban's spokesman, Zabiullah Mujahid, announced that Anwar ul Haq had pledged allegiance to the new Taliban emir, Hibatullah Akhundzada.
