= Zabihullah Mojaddidy =

Afghan politician (born 1946)

Dr. Zabihullah Mojaddidy ذبیح الله مجددی
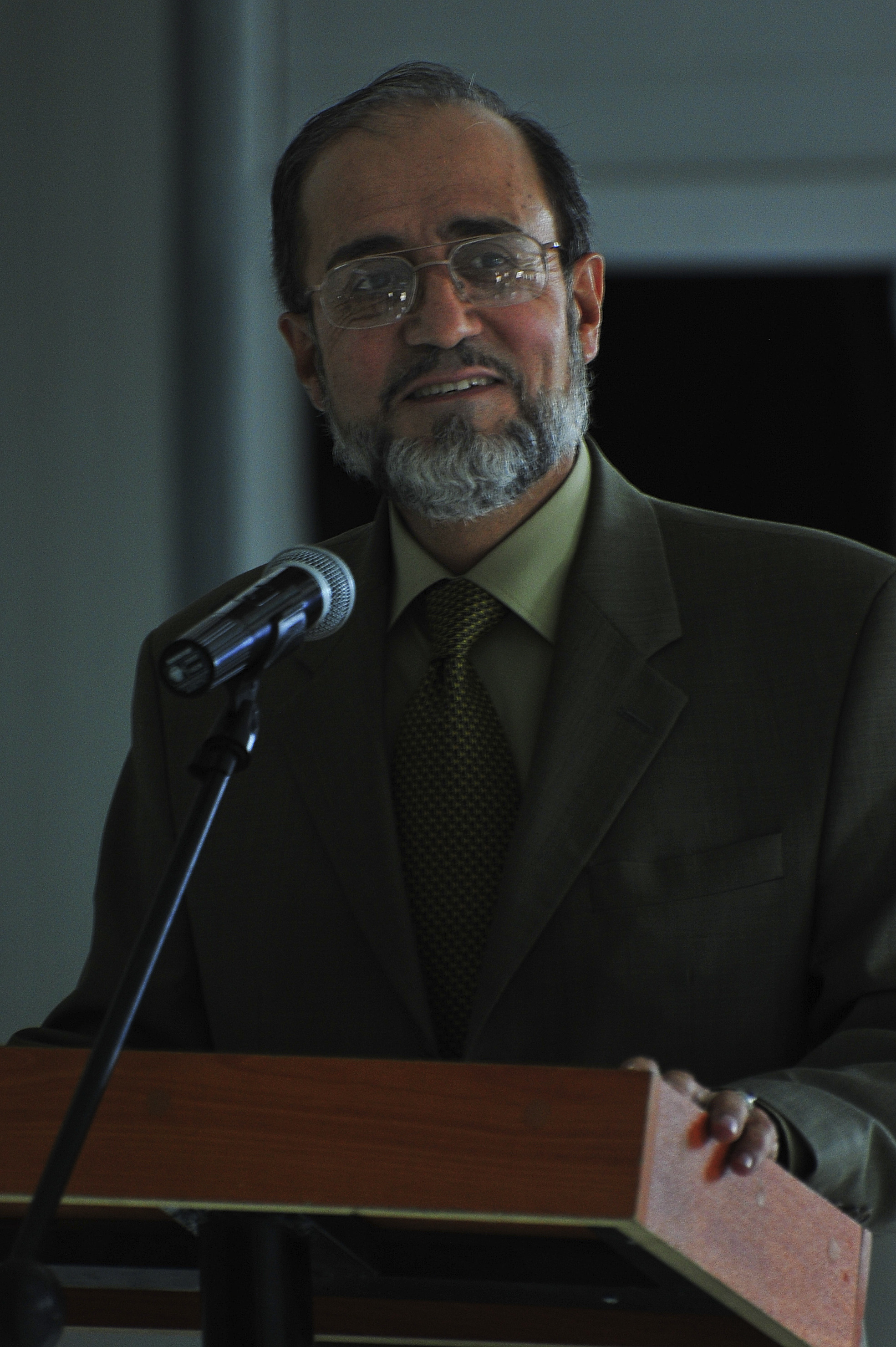
- Dr. Mojaddidy giving a speech in 2010

Governor of Kabul Province
- In office July 2009 – March 2011
- Preceded by: Din Mohammad
- Succeeded by: Ahmadullah Alizai

Personal details
- Born: 1946 (age 79–80) Kabul, Afghanistan
- Profession: Politician, former Mujahideen leader

Dr. Zabihullah Mojaddidy (born 1946) is an Afghan politician. He served as the Governor of Kabul Province between July 2009 and until resigning in March 2011. His resignation was due to a lack of support from development ministries and the Presidential Palace in regard to his ideas for the reconstruction of Kabul City. Prior to becoming governor, he served as the Deputy Minister of Higher Education.

== Background ==
Mojaddidi was born in 1946 in Kabul, Afghanistan, in an influential Afghan family. His father, Professor Sibghatullah Mojaddedi, was briefly the President of Afghanistan in 1992 and an elder in the politics of Afghanistan.

He graduated with a B.S. in Civil Engineering/Structures from the University of Hawaii in 1971, and an M.S. in Civil Engineering/Structures (1973) and PhD in Engineering Science & Mechanics (1977) from Virginia Polytechnic Institute & State University.

Zabihullah Mojaddidi served in the Mujahideen forces during the Soviet–Afghan War. He took part in international conferences, and functioned as Secretary General of Afghan National Liberation Front – a former major moderate Afghan resistance party and now a popular registered political party in the country. Dr. Mojaddidy's experience includes 8 years of volunteer work for Afghan refugees; 10 years of engineering practice in the United States in Quality Control, Project Management, Land Development and design of building, drainage and roadway structures, 12 years as university professor outside Afghanistan, one year as Deputy Minister of Higher Education and governor of Kabul Province since July 2009. He has published technical papers on nonlinear mechanics and has presented papers on the subject at the Canadian Congress of Applied Mechanics. His research on nonlinear vibrations is included in reputed textbooks on the subject.

=== Political work ===
- Secretary General; Afghan National Liberation Front
  - 1985 to 1996
  - 2004 to present time
- Vice Premier; First Afghan Interim Government in exile, Pakistan – 1986

Dr. Mojaddidy soon withdrew from this government on the basis that it did not have a mandate from representatives of the Afghan people. His withdrawal caused the failure of this government and paved the way for the formation of the AIG, the Islamic Interim Government, elected by a 420-member council of Afghan freedom fighters and others opposed to the Soviet-backed regime in Kabul.

- Deputy Minister of Higher Education & Vocational Training; Islamic State of Afghanistan, Afghanistan – 1992

While at the same time running the office of the minister who refused to take over his post, Dr. Mojaddidy resigned his post after hopelessly trying to rehabilitate the ministry at the face of the ensuing civil war that started with Prof. Rabbani's government.

- Member by Proxy; Supreme Leadership Council; Islamic State of Afghanistan, Afghanistan – 1992–1993
- Member of Staff of Afghan Resistance Leadership Delegations;
  - Islamic Conference, Islamabad -1978
  - Islamic Conference, Kuwait – 1984
- Member of Delegation of Afghan Resistance Leaders;
  - Guests to the European Parliament, Strasburg, France – 1980.
  - United Nations 40th Anniversary, New York City, USA – 1985

=== Professional affiliations ===
- Founding Member, Member of Board of Directors and President (2007–2009); Society of Afghan Architects & Engineers (SAAE); Afghanistan
- Founding Member; Structural Engineering Institute (SEI); USA
- Member; American Society of Civil Engineers (ASCE); USA
- Member; Society of Afghan Engineers (SAE); USA
- Member; International Who-is-Who of Professionals, 1997

=== Professional work experience ===
- Professor in Civil Engineering; King Faisal University; Saudi Arabia, (1977–1987)
- Volunteer Work with the Afghan Resistance Against Soviet Invasion of Afghanistan; Peshawar, Pakistan, (1987–1992)
- Deputy Minister of Higher Education and Vocational Training; Islamic State of Afghanistan, (1992–1993)
- Professor in Civil Engineering; Ahmadshah Abdali University for Afghan Refugees, Peshawar, Pakistan, (1994–1995)
- Senior Structural Engineer; Civil Services, Inc. (Engineering Design Consultants), Jacksonville, Florida, USA, (1996–2001)
- Project Manager – Specialist III; Department of Building & Development, Loudoun County Government, Virginia, USA, (2001–2004)
- Director of Design, QC/QA and Capacity Building Divisions; Technologists, Inc., Kabul, Afghanistan, (2004–2009)

== Publications ==
- "Nonlinear Analysis of the Aperiodic Responses of Beams", Proceedings of the Sixth Canadian Congress of Applied Mechanics, 1977. Co-authors: D.T. Mook, A.H. Nayfeh.
- "Nonlinear Detuning of Resonant Structural Vibrations", Proceedings of the Seventh Canadian Congress of Applied Mechanics, 1979. Co-authors: D.T. Mook, A.H. Nayfeh.
- "Model Couplings in the Aperiodic Responses of Beams", Submitted to the Eighth Canadian Congress of Applied Mechanics, 1981.
- Partial results of research on Nonlinear Vibrations included in the authoritative book on the subject titled "Nonlinear Oscillations" by A.H. Nayfeh and D.T. Mook, Wiley Interscience, N.Y., 1979.

Preceded by Din Mohammad	Governor of Kabul Province, Afghanistan; July 2009–March 2011	Succeeded by Ahmadullah Alizai
