= 313 Central Corps =

- Pashto: ۳۱۳ مرکزي قول اردو
- Founded: October 2021
- Country: Afghanistan
- Allegiance: Islamic Emirate of Afghanistan
- Branch: Afghan Army
- Type: Corps

Commanders
- Chief of Staff: Maulvi Naqibullah "Sahib"
- Commander: Maulvi Nasrullah "Mati"
- Deputy Commander: Maulvi Nusrat
- Notable commanders: Hamdullah Mukhlis †

The 313 Central Corps or Kabul Corps is one of the eight corps of the Afghan Army established in October 2021 and headquartered in Kabul. The current Chief of Staff is Maulvi Naqibullah "Sahib".

== Command Staff ==
Chiefs of Staff
| Chief of Staff | Period | Notes | Ref(s) |
|---|---|---|---|
| Qari Baryal | 4 October 2021 – 6 December 2021 | | |
| Maulvi Naqibullah "Sahib" | 7 December 2021 – Present | | |
Commanders
| Commander | Period | Notes | Ref(s) |
| Hamdullah Mukhlis † | 4 October 2021 – 2 November 2021 | | |
| Maulvi Nasrullah "Mati" | 7 December 2021 – Present | | |
Deputy Commanders
| Deputy Commander | Period | Notes | Ref(s) |
| Maulvi Nusrat | 4 October 2021 – Present | | |

== See also ==
- 201 Khalid Ibn Walid Corps
