= Wazir Arsala Khan =

19th century Afghan politician

Wazir Arsala Khan was an early ancestor of the influential Arsala family of Nangarhar Province, Afghanistan. He served as the foreign minister of Afghanistan in 1869.

Khan was the great-grandfather of the three Arsala brothers, Abdul Haq, Haji Din Mohammad, and Haji Abdul Qadir, who gained great power in Nangarhar Province during the Soviet-Afghan War, through their ties with Yunus Khalis.
