= Qari Baryal =

Afghan military commander

Qari Ihsanullah Baryal
- قاری احسان الله بریال

Governor of Kabul
- In office 7 November 2021 – 27 November 2023
- Prime Minister: Hasan Akhund
- Emir: Hibatullah Akhundzada
- Preceded by: Mullah Shirin Akhund
- Succeeded by: Mohammad Aman Obaid

Chief of Staff of the Kabul Corps
- In office 4 October 2021 – 6 December 2021
- Preceded by: Position established
- Succeeded by: Maulvi Naqibullah "Sahib"

Military service
- Allegiance: Islamic Emirate of Afghanistan
- Branch/service: Islamic Emirate Army
- Rank: Commander
- Commands: Chief of Staff of the Kabul Corps

Qari Baryal (قاری بریال) is the Taliban military leader and current Governor of Kapisa since 27 November 2023. He has also served as Chief of Staff of the 313 Central Corps from 4 October 2021 to 6 December 2021 and the Governor of Kabul to 27 November 2023.
