= List of governors of Kabul =

This is a list of the governors of Kabul Province, Afghanistan:

Governor	Period	Extra	Note
Shahgassi Sarwar Khan	1901	Father-in-law of Habibullah Khan, Emir of Afghanistan	
Mahmud Khan Barakzai	1919; 1920		
Mohammad Afzal Akram	1984–1990		
Din Mohammad	24 June 2009		
Zabihullah Mojaddidy	July 2009; March 2011		
Ahmadullah Alizai	April 2011 ???		
Mohammad Yaqoob Haideri	August 2017; August 2021		
Mullah Shirin Akhund	24 August 2021; 7 November 2021		
Qari Baryal	7 November 2021; 25 February 2022		
Neda Mohammad	25 February 2022; 30 November 2022		
Zahir Khan Khalid	30 November 2022 ???		
Mohammad Qasimin	??? Present		

== See also ==
- List of Afghanistan governors
