= Riley O'Neill =

Canadian soccer player and coach

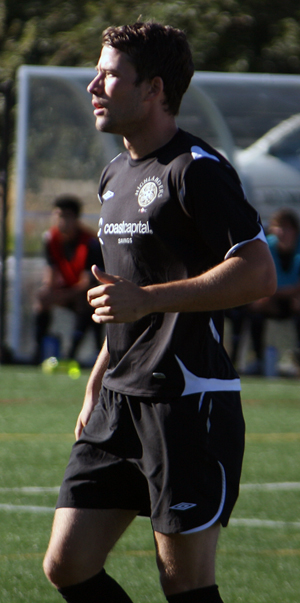
- O'Neill with the Victoria Highlanders in 2010

Personal information
- Date of birth: September 9, 1985 (age 41)
- Place of birth: Vancouver, British Columbia, Canada
- Height: 1.90 m (6 ft 3 in)
- Position: Forward

Team information
- Current team: Pacific FC (assistant)

College career
Years	Team	Apps	(Gls)
2003–2006	Kentucky	73	(28)

Senior career*
Years	Team	Apps	(Gls)
2007–2008	SV Wilhelmshaven	30	(12)
2008–2009	Eintracht Braunschweig	2	(0)
2008–2009	→ Eintracht Braunschweig II	14	(7)
2009–2010	SV Wilhelmshaven	27	(6)
2011–2012	MYPA	53	(12)
2013	Victoria Highlanders	24	(6)
2014–2015	CCBRT United		
Total		150	(43)

International career
2002	Canada U17	3	(0)
2004–2005	Canada U20	17	(3)

Managerial career
- Vic West FC
- 2020–: Pacific FC (assistant)
- * Club domestic league appearances and goals

Riley O'Neill (born September 9, 1985) is a Canadian soccer coach and former player who serves as an assistant coach for Pacific FC.

== Club career ==
On January 18, 2007 O'Neill was drafted by Colorado Rapids in the third round (36th overall) of the 2007 MLS Supplemental Draft. His rights were traded to Toronto FC on April 19, 2007. However, he never signed with Toronto, opting to try his luck abroad.

O'Neill signed with German club SV Wilhelmshaven who played in the Regionalliga Nord in 2007 through 2008, before moving to Eintracht Braunschweig. He struggled for playing time with Braunschweig, spending most his time with their second team. O'Neill moved back to SV Wilhelmshaven in 2009.

O'Neill moved again in 2011, this to MYPA who played in the Finnish Veikkausliiga. He managed twelve goals over two seasons with the club, but he became a free agent at the end of their 2012 season.

The Victoria Highlanders announced the signing of Riley O'Neill as one of their over-age players for the 2013 May–July summer USL PDL season. He joined 2014 to new founded Vancouver Metro Soccer League club CCBRT United FC, who played with former pro Taj Sangara.

== Coaching career ==
O'Neill earned his Canada Soccer Coaching B License in 2017. He began coaching with Vic West FC, before signing as an assistant coach with Canadian Premier League side Pacific FC on January 14, 2020. He is now the Technical Director for Oceanside FC in Qualicum Beach, BC
