= Hamdullah Mukhlis =

Taliban Commander (died 2021)

Mawlawi Hamdullah Mukhlis
- مولوی حمد اللہ مخلص

Commander of Staff of the Kabul Corps
- In office 4 October – 2 November 2021
- Prime Minister: Hasan Akhund
- Supreme Leader: Hibatullah Akhundzada
- Preceded by: Position established
- Succeeded by: Maulvi Nasrullah "Mati"

Personal details
- Died: 2 November 2021 Daoud Khan Military Hospital, Kabul, Afghanistan
- Nickname: Conqueror of Kabul

Military service
- Allegiance: Islamic Emirate of Afghanistan; Haqqani Network
- Branch/service: Badri 313 Battalion (Islamic Emirate Army)
- Rank: Commander
- Commands: Commander of Staff of the Kabul Corps
- Battles/wars: 2021 Taliban offensive: Fall of Kabul (2021); Islamic State–Taliban conflict †

Mawlawi Hamdullah Mukhlis (مولوی حمد اللہ مخلص) was a member of Afghan Taliban and the commander of Kabul Corps from 4 October 2021 to 2 November 2021. Maulvi Hamdullah also known as the Conqueror of Kabul because he was the first senior Taliban military commander to enter the Afghan presidential palace on the day of the fall of the capital, Kabul in 2021. Pictures from inside the presidential palace after the takeover showed Maulvi Hamdullah sitting on former US-backed President Ashraf Ghani’s chair. Hamdullah Mukhlis was a member of the Haqqani Network and a senior Badri Special Forces officer. He was killed on 2 November 2021 in a suicide attack on a hospital in Kabul city.

== Death ==
Hamdullah died on 2 November 2021, in a suicide attack on a hospital in Kabul. Hamdullah Mukhlis is the most senior Taliban leader to be killed since the Taliban took control of Afghanistan in August this year.
