= Mullah Shirin Akhund =

Governor of Kabul

Mullah Shirin Akhund ملا شیرین آخوند

Governor of Kandahar
- Incumbent
- Assumed office 4 May 2023
- Amir: Hibatullah Akhundzada
- Preceded by: Muhammad Yousuf Wafa

Governor of Kabul
- In office 24 August 2021 – 7 November 2021
- Amir: Hibatullah Akhundzada
- Preceded by: Mohammad Yaqub Haidari
- Succeeded by: Qari Baryal

Personal details
- Born: Mullah Mohammad Ali Hanafi Arghandab, Kandahar, Afghanistan
- Profession: Politician

Mullah Muhammad Shirin Akhund is an Afghan Taliban politician who served as the governor of Kabul from 24 August 2021 to 7 November 2021. He was also a member of the negotiation team in Qatar office. He was in charge of Mullah Omar's security during the 1996–2001 Islamic Emirate of Afghanistan, and one of Mullah Omar's close associates. He also served as commander of military intelligence. On 4 May 2023, the Taliban's supreme leader, Hibatullah Akhundzada, appointed Mullah Shirin Akhund as the governor of Kandahar province.
