= Ahmadullah Alizai =

Afghani politician

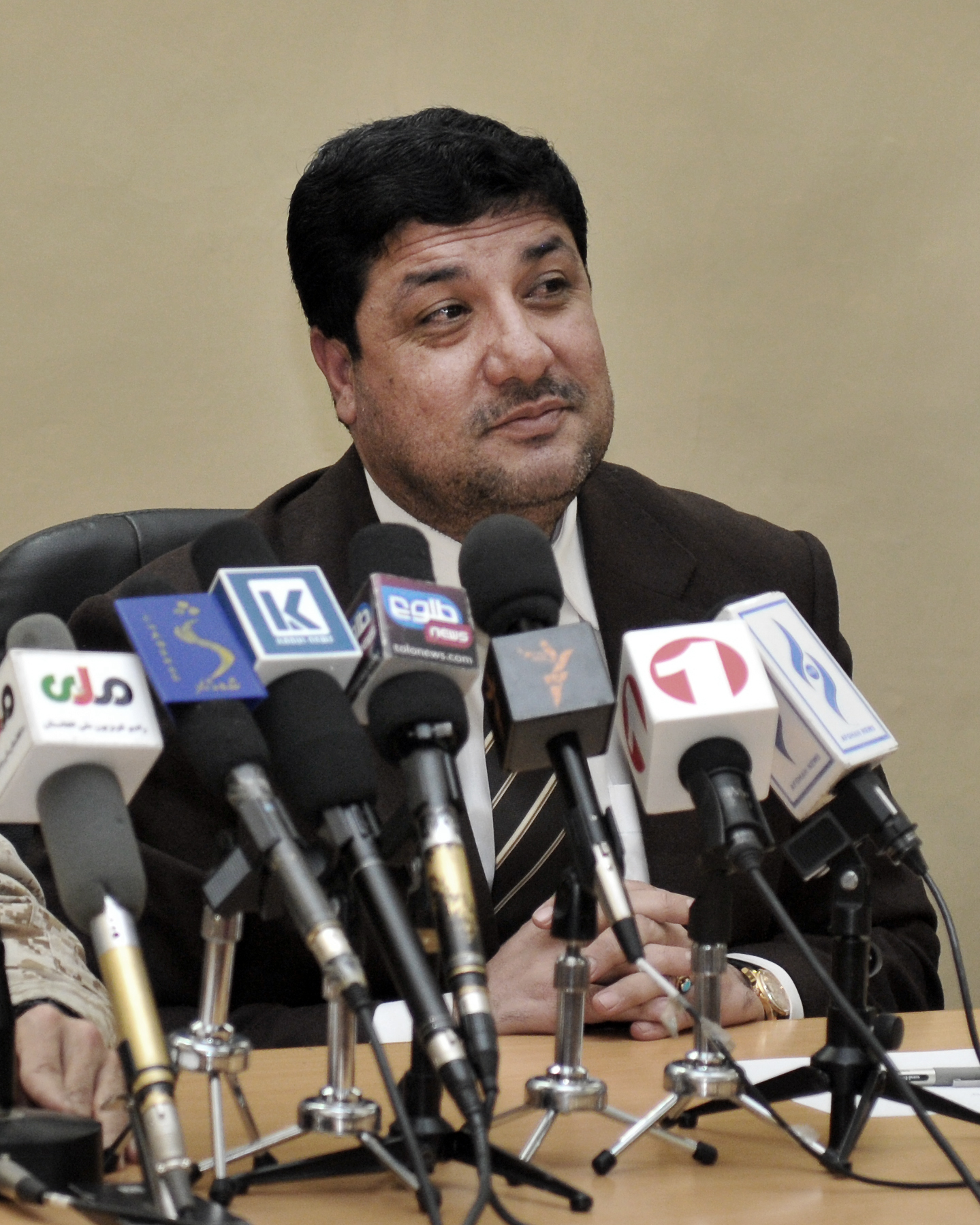
- Ahmadullah Alizai in 2011

Governor of Kabul Acting
- Incumbent
- Assumed office April 2011
- Preceded by: Zabihullah Mojaddidy
- Succeeded by: Abdul Jabbar Taqwa

Governor of Badghis
- In office 5 May 2013 – September 2015
- Preceded by: Tahir Sabari
- Succeeded by: Jamaluddin Ishaq

Personal details
- Born: 1972 (age 53–54) Maruf District, Kandahar Province, Afghanistan
- Party: Independent

Ahmadullah Alizai (born 1972) is a politician in Afghanistan who served as a ministerial advisor to the President. He has worked as Governor of Badghis and Governor of Kabul Province. He previously served as the Deputy Governor of Kabul Province, Deputy Governor of Nangarhar Province, and as Director of Counter-Narcotic directorate for the southwest zone.

== Early life ==
Alizai was born in 1972 in the Maruf District of Kandahar Province in southern Afghanistan. He is an ethnic Pashtun from the Alizai tribe of southern Afghanistan. He comes from an educated, influential and political family. His father was an elder of the Alizai tribe who played a vital role during the Soviet–Afghan War.

During the Soviet war, he migrated to Pakistan and gained primary education in Pishin, Balochistan. He graduated from high school in 1989. He earned his B.A degree in 1997 and M.A degree in 1999, both in political science.

== Career ==
During 1995, he established a non-governmental organization (NGO) in order to serve Afghans in Pakistan.

Alizai was appointed as the General Director for the ARDP for five years. He became the director of the Counter Narcotics Police of Afghanistan stationed in the southwest zone for three years right after he left the organization in 2001.

Alizai started his other job as the director for the general directorate of Counter-Narcotic at East zone, from 2005 to 2008. He was then appointed to assist the central government and government strategies, and was assigned to work as the deputy governor for the east Nangarhar provincial government office for one ending in 2008 but due to the needs and repeated asks of the central government he got an assignment as the deputy governor for the Kabul government office, where he could be more helpful to the government and the people of Afghanistan. He was the deputy governor in Kabul Province for three years starting from 2008. He became the acting governor of Kabul Province in April 2011 after Zabihullah Mojaddidy resigned.

| Preceded by Zabihullah Mojaddidy | Governor of Kabul, Afghanistan; 2011–present | Succeeded by [Incumbent] |
