= Hizb-i-Islami Afghanistan =

Primarily Pashtun Afghan political party and former militia

Hezb-e Islami Gulbuddin
- حزب اسلامی گلبدین
- Leader: Gulbuddin Hekmatyar
- Dates active: 1976–2016 (as a Paramilitary organization); 1976–2023 (as a political party)
- Dissolved: 2023
- Merger of: Taliban
- Allegiance: Afghanistan
- Group: Zafar brigade
- Active regions: Afghanistan
- Ideology: Qutbism; Pashtun interests Anti-American sentiment Anti-Sovietism; Anti-communism
- Political position: Far right
- Size: 1,500–2,000+ (2015 estimate)
- Part of: Peshawar Seven; Northern Alliance
- Wars: Soviet–Afghan War; Second Afghan Civil War; First Nagorno-Karabakh War; Third Afghan Civil War; War in Afghanistan

Hezb-e-Islami Gulbuddin (Pashto: حزب اسلامی گلبدین; abbreviated HIG), also referred to as Hezb-e-Islami or Hezb-i-Islami Afghanistan (HIA), is an Afghan political party and former paramilitary organization, originally founded in 1976 as Hezb-e-Islami and led by Gulbuddin Hekmatyar. In 1979, Mulavi Younas Khalis split with Hekmatyar and established his own group, which became known as Hezb-i Islami Khalis; the remaining part of Hezb-e Islami, still headed by Hekmatyar, became known as Hezb-e Islami Gulbuddin. Hezbi Islami seeks to emulate the Muslim Brotherhood and to replace the various tribal factions of Afghanistan with one unified Islamic state. This puts them at odds with the more tribe-oriented Taliban (which is predominantly Pashtun).

During the Soviet War in Afghanistan (1979–1989), Hezb-e Islami Gulbuddin was well-financed by anti-Soviet forces through the Pakistani Inter-Services Intelligence (ISI). In the mid-1990s, the HIG was "sidelined from Afghan politics" by the rise of the Taliban. In the post-2001 war in Afghanistan, HIG "reemerged as an aggressive militant group, claiming responsibility for many bloody attacks against Coalition forces and the administration of President Hamid Karzai". Its fighting strength was "sometimes estimated to number in the thousands". The group signed a peace deal with the Ghani administration in 2016.

Following the collapse of the Islamic Republic of Afghanistan, on 17 August 2021, Hekmatyar met with both Karzai, former President of Afghanistan, and Abdullah Abdullah, Chairman of the High Council for National Reconciliation and former Chief Executive, in Doha seeking to form a government (though it was unclear whether either Karzai or Abdullah would be directly involved in any such government). President Ashraf Ghani, having fled the country to either Tajikistan or Uzbekistan, emerged in the UAE and said that he supported such negotiations and was in talks to return to Afghanistan.

== History ==
=== Background: split-up Hezb-e-Islami ===
The original Hezb-e-Islami was founded in June 1976 by Gulbuddin Hekmatyar.

In 1979, Mulavi Younas Khalis made a split with Hekmatyar and established his own group, which became known as the Khalis faction, with its power base in Nangarhar. The remaining part of Hezb-e Islami, still headed by Gulbuddin Hekmatyar, was since then also known as 'Hezb-e Islami Gulbuddin' or HIG.

=== War against the Soviets and Kabul administrations ===
During the Soviet–Afghan War (1979–1989), Hezb-e Islami Gulbuddin was well-financed by anti-Soviet forces, through the Pakistani Inter-Services Intelligence (ISI). Hezb-e Islami Gulbuddin has also established contacts with the British intelligence services MI6, which provide it with military training, equipment and “propaganda” support, and its leader, Hekmatyar, met with Margaret Thatcher at Downing Street in 1986.

Since 1981 or 1985, Hezb-e Islami Gulbuddin formed a part of the Peshawar Seven alliance of Sunni Mujaheddin forces fighting the Soviet invasion.

From 1979 to 1981 the group was considered the most important resistance faction of the Peshawar groups. Because of Hekmatyar's character, the group's influence waned and its image tarnished by 1983 to other Afghan mujahideen.

Hekmatyar and his party operated near the Pakistani border against Soviet Communists. Areas such as Kunar, Laghman, Jalalabad, and Paktia were Hezb-e Islami's strongholds. The party is highly centralized under Hekmatyar's command and until 1994 had close relations with Pakistan.

Despite its ample funding, it has been described as having

...the dubious distinction of never winning a significant battle during the war, training a variety of militant Islamists from around the world, killing significant numbers of mujahideen from other parties, and taking a virulently anti-Western line. In addition to hundreds of millions of dollars of American aid, Hekmatyar also received the lion's share of aid from the Saudis.

— Peter L. Bergen, New York Free Press

=== Civil war (1992–2001) ===
In April 1992, Hezbi Islami (HIG) was involved in the outbreak of civil war in Afghanistan.

The bombardment of the capital Kabul by Hezb-i-Islami Afghanistan (HIA) in 1994 is reported to have "resulted in the deaths of more than 25,000 civilians." Frustrated by that continued destructive warlord feuding in Afghanistan, the Pakistani Inter-Services Intelligence (ISI) abandoned HIG for the Taliban in 1994.

After HIG was expelled from Kabul by the Taliban in September 1996, many of its local commanders joined the Taliban, "both out of ideological sympathy and for reason of tribal solidarity."

=== After 2001 ===
The Columbia World Dictionary of Islamism reports that, having lost Saudi support when it endorsed Saddam Hussein in 1990 and lost Pakistani support after 1994, "the remainder of Hizb-i Islami merged into al-Qaeda and the Taliban." The Jamestown Foundation describes it having been "sidelined from Afghan politics" for a decade or so after the Taliban takeover of Kabul. Hekmatyar opposed the 2001 American intervention in Afghanistan, and since then has aligned his group (Hezb-e-Islami) with remnants of the Taliban and al-Qaeda against the current Afghan government.

Hezb-e-Islami Gulbuddin was not the U.S. State Department list of Foreign Terrorist Organizations from 2001 to 2006. However, it was on the additional 2007 list called "Groups of Concern".

Radio Free Europe reports that "in 2006, Hekmatyar appeared in a video aired on the Arabic language Al-Jazeera television station and declared he wanted his forces to fight alongside Al-Qaeda." According to Le Monde newspaper, as of 2007, the group was active around Mazari Sharif and Jalalabad. HIG took credit for a 2008 attack on a military parade that nearly killed Karzai, an August 2008 ambush near Kabul that left ten French soldiers dead, and an October 3, 2009 attack by 150 insurgents that overwhelmed a remote outpost in Nuristan Province, killing eight American soldiers and wounding 24.

There have also been reports of clashes between members of the HIG and Taliban, and defection of HIG members to the Afghan government. Ten members of the group's "senior leadership" met in May 2004 with President Hamid Karzai and "publicly announced their rejection of Hezb-e-Islami's alliance with al-Qaeda and the Taliban." Prior to Afghanistan's 2004 elections, 150 members of the Hezb-e-Islami Gulbuddin party were said to have defected to Hamid Karzai's administration. Jamestown Foundation reported in 2004 that, according to Deputy Speaker of Parliament Sardar Rahmanoglu, HIA members "occupy around 30 to 40 percent of government offices, from cabinet ministers to provisional and other government posts." According to journalist Michael Crowley, as of 2010, HIG's political arm holds 19 of 246 seats in the Afghan parliament and "claims not to take cues from Hekmatyar, though few believe it."

In 2008, the International Security Assistance Force estimated that the military component of Hezbi Islam was about 1,000 strong, including part-time fighters.

As of 2009, the non-violent faction of the Hezbi Islami was a registered political party in Afghanistan led by Abdul Hadi Arghandiwal.

In early March 2010, elements of the Taliban and the HIG were reportedly fighting in Baghlan province.

Scores of Hizb-e-Islami militants, including 11 commanders and 68 fighters, defected on Sunday [7 March 2010] and joined the Afghan government as a clash between the group and the Taliban left 79 people dead, police said.

=== Peace negotiations 2010–2016 ===
On the celebration of Nowruz, New Year's Day, of 1389 (March 21, 2010, Western calendar) Harun Zarghun, chief spokesman for Hizb-i-Islami, said that a five-member delegation was in Kabul to meet with government officials and that there were also plans to meet with Taliban leaders somewhere in Afghanistan. Khalid Farooqi, a member of the parliament from Paktika province, confirmed that two delegations from Hizb-i-Islami had shown up. Zarghun, the group's spokesman in Pakistan, said that the delegation had a 15-point plan that called for the retreat of foreign forces in July 2010 – a full year ahead of President Barack Obama's intended withdrawal. The plan also called for the replacement of the current Afghan parliament in December 2010 by an interim government, or shura, which then would hold local and national elections within a year. Zarghun said that a new Afghan constitution would be written, merging the current version with ones used earlier.

The same day, Afghanistan's vice-president Mohammad Qasim Fahim reached out to militants at the Nowruz New Year celebrations in Mazar-i-Sharif in Northern Afghanistan. He declared that, with their input, a coming national conference would lay the foundations for peace. He called on resistance forces to participate in a jirga, or assembly, planned for late April or early May.

In late January 2012, America's special envoy to the region Marc Grossman talked peace and reconciliation with Hamid Karzai in Kabul, though the Afghan president made it clear that Afghans should be in the driver's seat; hours before the meeting, Karzai said he personally held peace talks recently with the insurgent faction Hizb-i-Islami, appearing to assert his own role in a U.S.-led bid for negotiations to end the country's decade-long war.

On 18 September 2012, Hezbi Islami claimed responsibility of a suicide attack in Kabul, carried out by an 18-year-old woman in which nine people were killed. They said it was in retaliation for the film Innocence of Muslims.

On 16 May 2013, Hezbi Islami claimed responsibility for another attack in Kabul in the form of an explosive-loaded Toyota Corolla that was rammed into a pair of American military vehicles in which 16 people were killed.

In July 2015, Afghan media outlets reported that Hekmatyar had called on followers of Hezb-e Islami to support the militant group Islamic State of Iraq and the Levant (ISIL) in the fight against the Taliban. Reuters quoted a spokesman for Hizb-i-Islami as denying this, and calling the earlier reports a fake.

=== 2010 Badakhshan massacre ===
In August 2010, Hezb-e-Islami Gulbuddin was possibly responsible for the 2010 Badakhshan massacre.

=== Alleged ties to North Korea ===
Although a rocket attack reported to have happened in 2007, killing all on board and destroying the vehicle, fit the characteristics of the mentioned North Korean rocket, the report remains unverified. No such Dr. Amin has surfaced of late.

=== 2016 peace deal ===
On 22 September 2016, the government of Afghanistan signed a draft peace deal with Hezb-i-Islami. According to the draft agreement, Hezb-i-Islami agreed to cease hostilities, cut ties to extremist groups and respect the Afghan Constitution, in exchange for government recognition of the group and support for the removal of United Nations and American sanctions against Hekmatyar, who was also promised an honorary post in the government.

The agreement was formalised on 29 September with both Afghan President Ashraf Ghani and Hekmatyar who appeared via a video link into the presidential palace, signing the agreement. The Afghan government formally requested UN in December 2016 for removal of sanctions against the group's leaders. The sanctions against Hekmatyar were lifted by the UN on 3 February 2017.

On June 14, 2018, 180 individuals tied to Hezbi Islami were released from prison. Peace negotiator Ghairat Baheer addressed the men, on their release, telling them the party expected them to be peaceful, law-abiding citizens. Tolo News reported that this was the fourth release of individuals tied to Hezbi Islami, and it brought the total number of released men to 500.

=== 2025 closure of Hezb-e Islami ===
On 14 April 2025, the Taliban government of the Islamic Emirate of Afghanistan enforced the closure of all Hezb-e Islami offices across Afghanistan, arresting the party’s staff and confiscating their equipment. The initial directive to close the party’s offices was issued by the Taliban’s Ministry of Justice on 29 March 2025, after Hezb-e Islami continued operation after the Taliban’s ban on political parties and independent political activity. The directive additionally states: “If there is any office of Hezb-e Islami in any province, its equipment must be handed over to the relevant authorities and the office closed. The staff should be detained until they repent from their activities”. The MoJ directive further orders that individuals operating under Hezb-e Islami, even in provinces without a formal office, must be identified and arrested.

The directive received criticism from supporters of the party and the son of Gulbuddin Hekmetyar, Habib-ur-Rahman Hekmetyar, who went on Twitter to denounce the Taliban for silencing any opposition to the regime and suppressing political expression, writing “The Taliban are ignorant of justice and Islamic rights. They do not tolerate advice, criticism, or dissent”. He then compared the Taliban to the former government under the People's Democratic Party of Afghanistan: “Only the Taliban have the right to govern, while hundreds of thousands of young people are fleeing the country. The communists failed and were disgraced — and the Taliban are repeating the same failed and shameful experiment”.

== Accused combatant prisoners at Guantanamo ==
Dozens of inmates at the United States prison at Guantanamo Bay faced allegations that they had been associated with the Hezb-e-Islami Gulbuddin.

Originally the Bush Presidency asserted it was not obliged to let any captives apprehended in Afghanistan know why they were being held, or to provide a venue where they could challenge the allegations against them. However, the United States Supreme Court's ruling in Rasul v. Bush required the institution of a review. The Supreme Court recommended the reviews be modeled after the Army Regulation 190-8 Tribunals that were ordinarily used to determine whether captives were innocent civilians who should be released, lawful combatants entitled to Prisoner of War status, or war criminals who could be tried, and who weren't protected by all the provisions of the Geneva Conventions.

The Department of Defense set up the Office for the Administrative Review of Detained Enemy Combatants (OARDEC). OARDEC administered an initial Combatant Status Review Tribunal for the 558 Guantanamo captives who were still in the detention camp as of August 2004. Unlike the AR 190-8 Tribunals, the Combatant Status Review Tribunals were not authorized to determine whether captives were entitled to POW status, only whether they were "enemy combatants." OARDEC also administered annual Administrative Review Board hearings. The Boards were only authorized to make a recommendation as to whether captives might represent an ongoing threat, or might continue to hold intelligence value, and therefore should continue to be held in US custody.

Close to 10,000 pages of documents from the Combatant Status Review Tribunals and Administrative Review Board hearings were released after contested Freedom of Information Act requests.

Dozens of captives faced allegations that they had been associated with the Hezb-e-Islami Gulbuddin. Some of the documents just alleged that a captive was associated with Hezb-e-Islami, without explaining why this implied they were an "enemy combatant". Other documents did provide brief explanations as how an association with Hezb-e-Islami implied a captive was an "enemy combatant". Neither Hezb-e-Islami nor Hezb-e-Islami Gulbuddin are on the U.S. State Department list of Foreign Terrorist Organizations and they never have been; but Gulbuddin is on the additional list called "Groups of Concern."

Abdullah Mujahid; Haji Hamidullah; Alif Mohammed; Adel Hassan Hamad	"Hezb-e-Islami Gulbuddin is a faction of the Hezb-e-Islami party, and it was one of the major mudjahedin groups in the war against the Soviets. Hezb-e-Islami Gulbuddin has long-established ties with Bin Ladin."
Mahbub Rahman	Gulbuddin Hikmatyar founded HIG as a faction of the Hizb-Islami party in 1977, and it was one of the major Mujahadin groups in the war against the Soviets. HIG has long established ties with Usama Bin Laden. HIG has staged small attacks in its attempt to force NATO troops to withdraw from Afghanistan, overthrow the Afghan government, and establish a fundamentalist state.
Juma Din	Hezb-e Islami Gulbuddin was one of the major mujahedin groups in the war against the Soviets. Hezb-e Islami Gulbuddin has long-established ties with Bin Laden. Hezb-e Islami Gulbuddin has staged small attacks in its attempt to force U.S. troops to withdraw from Afghanistan, overthrow the Afghan Transitional Administration [sic] (Afghan Transitional Administration), and establish a fundamentalist state.
Taj Mohammed	The Secretary of State has identified the HIG as a Foreign Terrorist Organization. Gulbuddin Hikmatyar [sic] founded HIG as a faction of the Hizb-I Islami party in 1977 and it was one of the major Mujahedin groups in the war against the Soviets. HIG has long-established ties with Usama bin Ladin. HIG has stages small attacks in its attempt to force United States troops to withdraw from Afghanistan, overthrow the Afghanistan government, and establish a fundamentalist state.
Mohammed Quasam	Gulbuddin Hekmatyar founded Hezb-e-Islami Gulbuddin [sic] as a faction of the Hezb-e-Islami Gulbuddin [sic] party in 1977, and that it was one of the major Mujadhedin [sic] groups in the war against the Soviets; that the Hezb-e-Islami Gulbuddin has long established ties with Usama Bin Ladin; that Hexb-e-Islami Gulbuddin has staged small attacks in its attempt to force United States troops to withdraw from Afghanistan, overthrow the Afghanistan Transitional Administration, and establish a fundamentalist state.
Akhtar Mohammed	The Hizb-I Islami Gulbuddin [sic] (HIG) is a faction of the Hizb-I Islami party and was one of the major mujahedin groups in the war against the Soviets. HIG has long established ties with Bin Laden. In [sic] early 1990s, the HIG ran several terrorist training camps in Afghanistan and was pioneer in sending mercenary fighters to other Islamic conflicts. The HIG offered to shelter Bin Laden after he hfled Sudan in 1996.
Nasrullah; Abdul Zahor; Abdul Ghaffar	Hizb-I Islami Gulbuddin has staged small attacks in its attempt to force U.S. troops to withdraw from Afghanistan, overthrow the Afghan Transitional Administration and establish a fundamentalist state.
Jumma Jan	HIG has long-established ties with Usama Bin Laden. HIG has staged small attacks in its attempt to force U.S. troops to withdraw from Afghanistan, overthrow the Afghan Transitional Administration and establish a fundamentalist state.
Jumma Jan	Hezb-e-Islami Gulbuddin [sic] (HIG) has been designated by the United States as a terrorist organization.
Sharbat; Taj Mohammed	"The HIG is listed in the U.S. Department of Homeland Security Terrorist Organization Reference Guide as having long-established ties with Usama Bin Laden."
Abdul Zahor	HIG is listed on the Department of Homeland Security Terrorist Organization Reference Guide.
Mohammed Quasam	The United States Department of Homeland Security has designated Hexb-e-Islami Gulbuddin [sic] as a terrorist organization.
Sharifullah	"Hezb-E-Islam/Gulbuddin (HIG) members recruited young and impressionable radical men from the Shamshatoo Refugee camp to train at camps focusing on advanced training including remote controlled Improvised Explosive Devices (IEDs) and electronics."
Abdul Majid Muhammed	"Hezb-e Islami Gulbuddin (HIG) has long established ties with Usama Bin Ladin. (HIG) founder Gulbuddin Hikmatyar offered to shelter Bin Ladin after the latter fled Sudan in 1996. HIG has staged small attacks in its attempt to force U.S. troops to withdraw from Afghanistan, overthrow the Afghan Transitional Administration (ATA) and establish a fundamentalist state.
Lufti Bin Swei Lagha	"The Armed Islamic Group (GIA) and Hizb-I Islami Gulbuddin [sic] are designated terrorist organizations. Hizb-I Islami Gulbuddin ran terrorist training camps in Afghanistan. They have staged attacks in an attempt to force U.S. troops to withdraw from Afghanistan."
Adel Hassan Hamad	"In the early 1990s, Hikmatyar ran several terrorist training camps in Afghanistan and was a pioneer in sending mercenary fighters to other Islamic conflicts. Hikmatyar offered to shelter Bin Laden after the latter fled Sudan in 1996."
Mohammed Nasim; Sabar Lal Melma	Hezb-e Islami Gulbuddin (HIG) has long established ties with Usama Bin Laden. HIG was known to have several terrorist training camps in Afghanistan and was the pioneer in sending mercenary fighter [sic] to other Islamic conflicts. The founder of HIG was known to have shelteed Usama Bin Laden after he fled the Sudan. HIG has staged small attacks in its attempt to force U.S. troops to withdraw from Afghanistan.
Haji Nasrat Khan	Hizb-I Islami Gulbuddin (HIG) was one of the major mujahedin groups in the war against the Soviets. HIG has long established ties with Usama bin Laden. Gulbuddin Hikmatyar founded HIG. Hikmatyar ran several terrorist training camps in Afghanistan and was a pioneer in sending mercenary fighters to other Islamic fighting conflicts. Hikmatyar offered to shelter Usama bin Laden after he later fled Sudan in 1996.
Mohamed Jawad	The Hezb-E-Islami [sic] organization is a terrorist organization with long-established ties to Bin Laden.
Juma Din	HIG is a designated terrorist group with long-established links to Usama Bin Laden.
Akhtiar Mohammad	The HiG is listed in the Terrorist Organization Reference Guide as having long-established ties with Usama Bin Laden.
Faiz Ullah	The Hizb-I Islami Gulbuddin [sic] (HIG) has been identified as an organization which sponsor terrorism.
Jumma Jan	HIG has been designated by the United States as a terrorist organization.
Faiz Ullah	The Hezb-e Islami Gulbuddin [sic] (HIG) was founded by Hikmatyar [sic] in 1977, as a faction of the Hezb-e Islami party, and it was one of the major mujahedin groups in the war against [sic] Soviets. HIG has long-established ties with Usama bin Laden.
Rahmatullah Sangaryar; Hamidullah; Mohammed Mussa Yakubi	Hizb-I Islami Gulbuddin (HIG) is a terrorist group.
Mohammed Mustafa Sohail	Hezb-E-Islami Gulbuddin is a known terrorist organization that has long established ties to al Qaida.
Haji Nasrat Khan	The HIG is an active terrorist organization in Afghanistan with long established ties to Usama Bin Laden.
Abdul Razak	In the spring of 2003, Taliban supreme leader Mullah Mohammad Omar, Hizb-I-Islami Gulbuddin [sic] leader Gulbuddin Hekmatyar, and Usama bin Laden [sic] agreed to unite their forces.
Gholam Ruhani	The Taliban military commander is associated with Hizb-I Islami Gulbuddin [sic] (HIG). The U.S. Department of Homeland Security, Terrorist Organization Reference Guide, states that HIG has long established ties with Usama Bin Laden [sic] and has staged attacks in attempts to force United States troop withdrawal from Afghanistan.

== See also ==
- List of Islamic political parties
