= Humanitarian aid in conflict zones =

Humanitarian aid in conflict zones is the provision of emergency assistance and support to individuals and communities affected by armed conflict, with the aim of alleviating suffering, maintaining human dignity, and preserving life. This type of aid encompasses a wide range of services, including but not limited to, the delivery of food, water, shelter, medical care, and protection services, and is delivered amidst challenging and often dangerous conditions, with the goal of reaching those most in need regardless of their location, political affiliation, or status.

Criticism around humanitarian aid has persisted to claim that the distribution of aid in conflict zones poses significant ethical, legal, and operational challenges, particularly when it comes to the inadvertent support of terrorist organizations in regions controlled or influenced by terrorist groups. There have been several incidents where aid convoys were hijacked and looted by the terrorist groups in control. Humanitarian actions in conflict zones risk legal implications, potentially being construed as support for terrorism or criminal complicity.

== Conflict zones requiring humanitarian aid ==
=== Afghanistan ===
Afghanistan has endured decades of conflict, affecting millions of lives. The ICRC, WFP, and the Afghan Red Crescent Society, among others, have focused on delivering emergency aid, supporting healthcare facilities, providing mental health support, and facilitating access to clean water and sanitation. In 2024, Afghanistan continues to face one of the world's worst humanitarian crises, with over 23.7 million people in need of life-saving assistance.

Prior to their return to power in 2021, the Taliban imposed restrictions on humanitarian operations in Afghanistan, particularly affecting the delivery of aid to areas under their influence. The group enforced rules on the activities of aid organizations, including imposing limitations on female workers, and sometimes demanded that aid operations be conducted under their supervision. The Taliban's interference has made it challenging for aid organizations to operate freely and reach those in urgent need of assistance.

The humanitarian crisis is compounded by severe restrictions on women's rights and widespread violence. The Taliban's imposition of rules has drastically limited women and girls' access to education, employment, and even basic freedom of movement, contributing to a deepening crisis of gender apartheid. Such policies not only undermine fundamental human rights but also severely impact the delivery and effectiveness of humanitarian aid, as women are crucial in assessing and addressing the humanitarian needs of communities. Moreover, the ongoing violence, including attacks by the Islamic State of Khorasan Province (ISKP) and internal restrictions by the Taliban, continues to exacerbate the challenges faced by civilians and aid workers alike.

Aid workers in Afghanistan face direct threats to their safety, including kidnappings and attacks by armed groups. These security risks are compounded by administrative hurdles, such as visa restrictions for international staff and regulations that limit the operations of non-governmental organizations. Such challenges can delay or disrupt the provision of urgently needed humanitarian assistance.

=== Gaza ===
The Gaza Strip has witnessed several conflicts and military operations over the years due to the Israel-Gaza conflict. The humanitarian efforts in the Gaza Strip, coupled with the security challenges faced by Israel, highlight a complicated situation requiring innovative responses from all involved parties. Organizations such as the United Nations Relief and Works Agency for Palestine Refugees in the Near East (UNRWA), the Palestine Red Crescent Society, and international NGOs like Médecins Sans Frontières have been all involved in providing humanitarian assistance. These efforts include emergency medical care, psychological support, education, food assistance, and infrastructure repair to ensure access to clean water and electricity. Growing concerns over the potential for famine in parts of Gaza underscore the critical need for ongoing aid deliveries and improved access.

In response to the crisis and the international call for increased humanitarian assistance, Israel has committed to enhancing the flow of aid into Gaza from various entry points. This initiative involves a combination of land, air, and sea deliveries.

The blockade on the Gaza Strip, enforced by Israel and Egypt citing security concerns following the takeover of the Gaza strip by Hamas, has significant implications for the flow of goods and the movement of people. This includes a wide range of essential items such as medical supplies, food, and fuel, which are crucial for supporting the basic needs of the population. The limitations on these goods have notable effects on the availability of healthcare, nutrition, and energy resources within the Gaza Strip. The restrictions extend to the movement of humanitarian personnel, impacting the ability of aid organizations to efficiently deliver assistance and execute operations within the region.

On several occasions, Hamas has been accused of diverting humanitarian aid supplies meant for the civilian population in Gaza for its own use or for the benefit of its supporters. The diversions include international assistance, which has been redirected towards constructing terror tunnels and rocket factories. In addition, Hamas's activities have extended to exploiting the delivery of humanitarian aid and resources, including fuel, for military rather than civilian purposes. Evidence has been presented showing Hamas's control over the distribution of fuel in Gaza, including instances where fuel intended for hospitals has been redirected to the organization's operations. Hamas imposes regulations and restrictions on international and local aid organizations operating in Gaza. This includes the requirement for these organizations to coordinate with Hamas authorities, which can complicate the delivery of aid and the operations of these organizations.

=== South Sudan ===
South Sudan, the world's youngest nation, has been plagued by civil conflict since its independence in 2011. Humanitarian aid in South Sudan is vital due to a complex crisis exacerbated by prolonged conflict, food insecurity, and the impact of the climate crisis, affecting an estimated 9.4 million people, including 4.9 million children and over 300,000 refugees primarily from Sudan. The country struggles with violence against civilians, with documented cases of attacks, sexual violence, and impunity contributing to the humanitarian challenges. Humanitarian organizations, including the United Nations Children's Fund (UNICEF), WFP, and Oxfam, have worked tirelessly to provide emergency food aid, clean water, healthcare, and protection services, especially to children and vulnerable populations.

In South Sudan, the combination of conflict and environmental factors, such as seasonal flooding, creates significant logistical challenges for delivering aid. The lack of infrastructure, such as roads and bridges, which are often targeted or neglected during the conflict, means that organizations frequently resort to expensive and less efficient means of transport, like air drops, to deliver food and supplies to remote areas.

=== Syria ===
Since the outbreak of the Syrian Civil War in 2011, millions of Syrians have been displaced, and countless lives have been lost. Humanitarian aid organizations, such as the International Committee of the Red Cross (ICRC), the Syrian Arab Red Crescent (SARC), have been active in providing medical care, food, water, and shelter. The Syrian conflict has left approximately 70% of the population in need of humanitarian assistance, reflecting the vast scale of the crisis as described by senior UN officials.

Human Rights Watch's World Report 2023 outlines the persistent challenges in delivering humanitarian aid and addressing the rights implications of the ongoing economic crisis. Indiscriminate attacks by Syrian-Russian military forces have continued, affecting civilians and critical infrastructure. Northeast Syria has faced threats of military incursion and mutual bombardment, exacerbating the humanitarian situation. The report also notes that 90% of Syrians live below the poverty line, with over 12 million food insecure, showcasing the dire economic conditions and the critical need for continued international support.

One of the primary complications in delivering the aid has been negotiating access across front lines in a highly fragmented conflict with multiple armed groups. The risk of aid convoys coming under attack or being looted is significant. Furthermore, obtaining permissions from all parties to deliver aid in contested or besieged areas can be incredibly complex and time-consuming, delaying critical assistance to those in need.

In addition, during its control over large swathes of territory in Syria, ISIS (Islamic State in Iraq and Syria) significantly interfered with humanitarian operations. The group seized control of aid convoys, stole supplies intended for civilians, and imposed strict regulations on aid organizations. ISIS's occupation of critical infrastructure, such as water and electricity facilities, allowed the group to manipulate the provision of essential services to civilians, using humanitarian needs as a weapon of war.

=== Ukraine ===
The conflict in Eastern Ukraine, which began in 2014, has resulted in significant humanitarian challenges, with approximately 40% of Ukraine's population requiring humanitarian assistance. Organizations such as the ICRC, the United Nations Office for the Coordination of Humanitarian Affairs (OCHA), and local NGOs have been active in providing food, medical care, shelter, and support for internally displaced persons. The conflict in Eastern Ukraine has resulted in extensive mine contamination and shifting frontlines, making many areas dangerous or inaccessible for humanitarian operations. Mines and unexploded ordnance pose a constant threat to both civilians and aid workers, complicating the delivery of assistance and the assessment of needs in affected areas.

=== Yemen ===
The Yemeni Civil War, which escalated in 2015, has created one of the worst humanitarian crises in the world. Organizations like the United Nations World Food Programme (WFP), Save the Children, and the ICRC have been instrumental in delivering aid, including food supplies, healthcare, and support for displaced families.

== Complications in aid delivery ==
The distribution of humanitarian aid in conflict zones is fraught with ethical, legal, and operational challenges, particularly due to the risk of inadvertently supporting terrorist organizations.

=== Ethical ===
Humanitarian aid can inadvertently benefit terrorist groups through diversion, taxation, or theft. This raises ethical dilemmas about contributing to the sustenance of these groups while trying to aid civilians. For example, there have been instances where aid organizations, under duress, have been coerced into redirecting assistance directly to terrorist groups, as was the case in Syria with Hay’at Tahrir al-Sham, a successor to the al-Qaeda-affiliated group Jabhat al-Nusra.

=== Legal ===
Legally, organizations face the challenge of complying with international laws and sanctions that prohibit material support to designated terrorist organizations. This includes the complex landscape of counter-terrorism legislation that varies by country and can affect the flow of funds, the procurement of supplies, and the movement of personnel. U.S. material support laws pose significant legal hurdles, making it nearly impossible for humanitarian groups to operate in conflict zones without the risk of violating these laws. The broad interpretation of what constitutes "material support" to terrorist organizations complicates efforts to provide humanitarian assistance, with organizations risking prosecution even when their intent is purely to aid civilians.

=== Operational ===
Violence and insecurity, including attacks on aid workers and essential infrastructure, severely restrict access to those in need. Between 2014 and 2017, there were over 660 attacks on aid workers, with the majority targeting local staff. Such security risks not only endanger aid workers but also impede the delivery of aid to affected populations.

Bureaucratic hurdles and sanctions further complicate the delivery of aid. In conflict zones, governments or armed groups may impose restrictions that hamper humanitarian efforts, such as curbing the import of aid equipment or exploiting aid organizations through excessive taxes and fees. Additionally, international sanctions, while intended to pressure terrorist organizations, often make it difficult for humanitarian agencies to operate effectively, particularly when these sanctions lack clear humanitarian carve-outs.

== Solutions for aid delivery ==
Addressing the complexities of delivering humanitarian aid in conflict zones, especially when dealing with the interference of terrorist groups and governing entities like Hamas in Gaza, requires innovative and adaptable solutions. Organizations have developed several strategies to mitigate risks and ensure that aid reaches those in need. Here are some examples of solutions that have been implemented:

=== Airdrops ===
In areas where ground access is either too dangerous or blocked, airdrops have become a vital method of delivering food, medical supplies, and other essentials directly to those in need. This approach was notably used in Syria and South Sudan, where the UN World Food Programme and other agencies have conducted airdrops to bypass conflict lines and reach besieged or remote communities.

=== Increased negotiations ===
Humanitarian organizations often engage in increased negotiations with all parties to a conflict, including government forces, rebel groups, and entities like Hamas. These negotiations aim to secure safe passage for aid convoys and establish ceasefires that allow for the delivery of humanitarian assistance. The success of these negotiations can depend on a variety of factors, including leveraging international diplomatic support and ensuring neutrality.

=== Use of technology ===
Technology plays a crucial role in modern humanitarian aid delivery, significantly enhancing the ability to respond to crises with greater efficiency and impact. This includes using satellite imagery to map routes and identify needs, employing drones for small-scale deliveries and assessments, and utilizing secure communication channels to coordinate aid distribution in real-time. Technology can help navigate around the restrictions imposed by groups like Hamas in Gaza or in areas with a high risk of interference from terrorist organizations.

MIT's Lincoln Laboratory is at the forefront of developing technology solutions to address humanitarian, climate, and health challenges. Their work includes initiatives to accelerate national and global responses to climate change through systems analysis and architecture. This approach aims to create a comprehensive roadmap for resilience against climate change by implementing known solutions, such as wind and solar energy, and identifying gaps where further research and development are needed. The Laboratory also emphasizes the importance of using regional proving grounds for evaluating climate-related prototypes under real-world conditions, thereby facilitating the transition of new technologies across different regions.

=== Cash-based assistance ===
In conflict zones, the deployment of cash-based assistance (CBA) programs, including cash and vouchers, offers several benefits over traditional in-kind aid, but it also introduces unique challenges and considerations. Beneficiaries can use cash or vouchers to purchase what they need most, supporting local markets and reducing the logistical challenges of transporting and distributing goods. This approach requires a functioning market and banking system, which may not be available in all locations.

While there are many benefits of cash programming, as discussed in research conducted by the Humanitarian Research Center in partnership with the International Rescue Committee, protection risks associated with cash programming in conflict-affected settings need careful consideration. These risks can be related to the targeting process, delivery mechanisms, and ongoing participation in cash programs.

=== Enhanced security measures ===
For the protection of aid workers and convoys, enhanced security measures are sometimes necessary. This can include using armed escorts in the most dangerous areas, although it raises ethical questions about the neutrality of humanitarian aid. The International Committee of the Red Cross (ICRC) emphasizes the importance of adhering strictly to the principles of humanitarian action, such as humanity, impartiality, neutrality, and independence. While the ICRC generally opposes the use of armed escorts, acknowledging that their presence could potentially harm the perception of humanitarian organizations as neutral entities, it also recognizes that in some extreme situations where the collapse of state structures leads to rampant banditry threatening relief deliveries, the use of armed escorts cannot be entirely ruled out to ensure the security of humanitarian convoys and the safety of the population they serve.

In high-risk environments like Syria, humanitarian organizations have had to adapt by employing various operational compromises, such as clandestine operations, to continue providing aid. These adaptations can include operating without the knowledge of state and non-state actors involved in the conflict, which may compromise the quality of aid due to barriers in access, resupply difficulties, and reduced coordination. MSF, for instance, has provided support to underground and improvised medical facilities in government-controlled areas of Syria, adapting to the harsh realities of operating in such environments.

In delivering humanitarian aid to Gaza, for example, security measures are crucial due to the complex environment shaped by ongoing conflict and the presence of armed groups. According to reports, numerous aid convoys have been canceled due to security risks in Gaza. In order to protect aid workers and ensure the safe passage of aid, organizations coordinating with all relevant parties to mitigate risks and maintain the integrity of humanitarian missions to prevent incidents that could endanger aid workers or impede humanitarian operations. The presence and actions of Hamas, along with the ongoing conflict with Israel, create significant security risks for humanitarian workers in Gaza. Incidents of violence, including airstrikes and clashes, pose dangers to those attempting to deliver aid and conduct humanitarian operations.

== See also ==
- Humanitarian aid
- war
- List of designated terrorist groups
