= Abdul Baqi Turkistani =

Afghani militia leader and politician

Abdul Baqi Turkistani is a citizen of Afghanistan who has served as both a militia leader and a politician. He was a subordinate of Afghan Northern Alliance leader General Dostum during the civil war with the Taliban. When trying to negotiate an exchange of prisoners he was himself taken captive by the Taliban.

He was a running mate of Nasrullah Arsalai during Afghanistan's 2009 Presidential election.
