= Mohammad Yunus Khalis =

Afghan Mujahideen commander (1919–2006)

- محمد يونس خالص
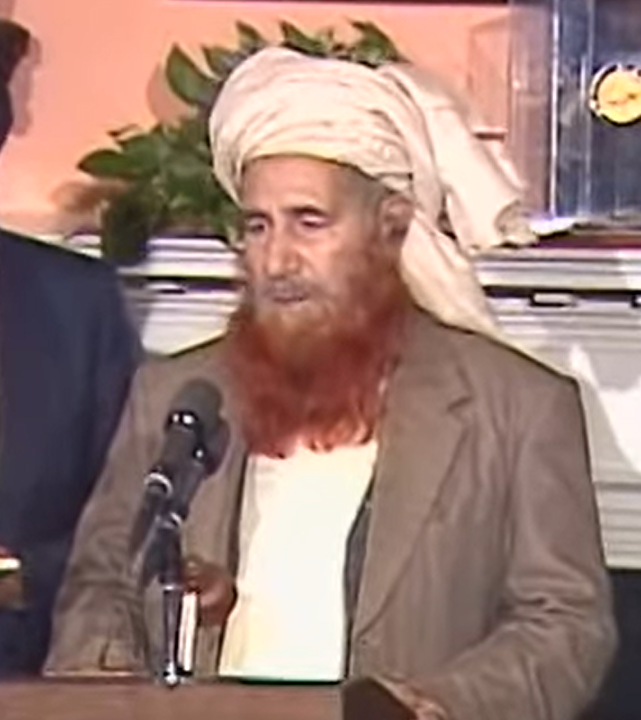
- Khalis at the White House in 1987

Leader of Hezb-e Islami Khalis
- In office 1979–2006
- Preceded by: position established
- Succeeded by: Din Mohammad (main faction); Anwar ul Haq Mujahid (dissident faction)

Personal details
- Born: 1919 Khogyani District, Nangarhar Province, Afghanistan
- Died: 19 July 2006 (aged 86–87)
- Children: Anwar ul Haq Mujahid; Matiul Haq Khalis
- Education: Darul Uloom Haqqania, Akora Khattak, Khyber Pakhtunkhwa, Pakistan
- Occupation: former Hezb-i Islami Khalis leader, former Mujahideen leader

Military service
- Allegiance: Hezb-e Islami Khalis; Pakistan
- Battles/wars: Soviet–Afghan War

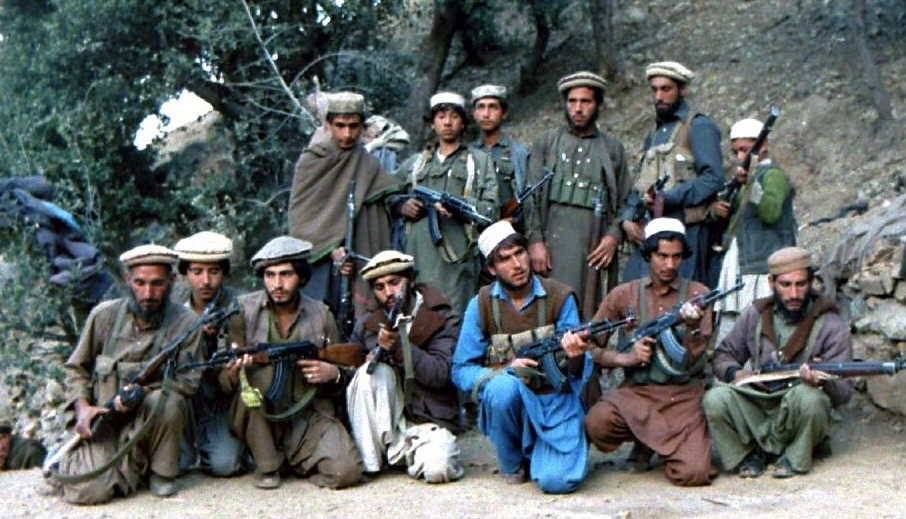
Mujahideen loyal to Yunus Khalis, in October 1987.

Mohammad Yunus Khalis (alternate spellings Yunis and Younas) (Pashto: محمد يونس خالص; c. 1919 – 19 July 2006) was a mujahideen commander in Afghanistan during the Soviet–Afghan War. His party was called Hezb-i-Islami ("Islamic Party"), the same as Gulbuddin Hekmatyar's party. The two are commonly differentiated as Hezb-e Islami Khalis and Hezb-e-Islami Gulbuddin.

== Early life and biography ==
Belonging to the Khogyani tribe of Pashtuns, Maulvi Mohammad Yunus Khalis was born in 1919 in Khogyani District, Nangarhar Province in Afghanistan. Educated in Islamic law and theology at the Darul Uloom Haqqania in Pakistan, Khalis exercised influence through his conservative vision of Islamic society. Sometimes referred to as the don of Nangarhar, he was also a shrewd politician who wielded considerable power behind the scenes during one of the most turbulent and violent periods in his country’s history.

After the overthrow of king Zahir Shah by Daoud Khan in 1973, Khalis reportedly wrote a book criticizing Daoud's administration, which forced him to flee to Pakistan in 1974. There he joined Hekmatyar's Islamic Party (Hezb-e Islami). After the Soviet invasion of Afghanistan, Khalis broke with Hekmatyar and established his own party (Hezb-e Islami Khalis). Unlike some other leaders of the Afghan mujahideen, Khalis depended more on his tribal support rather than religious to gather followers in his native Nangarhar province against the Democratic Republic.

Khalis reportedly entered Afghanistan many times to join his forces in waging war against the Soviets and their local proxies. Many prominent mujahideen commanders including Abdul Haq, Amin Wardak Faisal Babakarkhail and Jalaluddin Haqqani were affiliated with Hezb-e-Islami Khalis. In 1987, Khalis met with President Ronald Reagan at the White House while in the United States following a U.N General Assembly Vote calling for the withdrawal of foreign troops from Afghanistan. President Reagan expressed his support for the Mujahedin and called Afghanistan a "nation of heroes."

After the fall of the Communist regime in 1992, Khalis participated in the interim Islamic State government. He was a member of the Leadership Council (Shura-ye Qiyaadi), but held no other official post. Instead of moving to Kabul, he chose to remain in Nangarhar. His party controlled major parts of this politically and strategically important province. The Taliban brought Nangarhar under their control in September 1996 and Khalis was supportive of the Taliban movement and had a close relationship with Taliban commanders.

Khalis resided in Pakistan in the late 1990s. After the fall of the Taliban, his supporters regained their stronghold in Jalalabad where Khalis exerted considerable influence, although he held no official post. Two of his close associates, Haji Abdul Qadir and Haji Din Mohammad served as governors of Nangarhar Province after the fall of the Communist regime.

Steve Coll described Yunus Khalis as "an octogenarian who took teenage wives."

According to a statement from his son Anwar ul Haq Mujahid, leader of the insurgent group Tora Bora Military Front, Khalis died on 19 July 2006.

== Books ==
The author of many essays and poetry collections, his publications include:

=== Pashto ===
- Dīnī malghalirī, Kābul : Dawlatī Maṭbaʻh, 1957, 140 p. Fundamentals of Islam.
- Damūnah aw dāne : shiʻrī ṭolgah, Peṣhawar : Iḥsān Khparandwiyah Ṭolanah, 2002, 124 p. Pashto poetry.
- Da Islāmī ʻālam nan aw parūn : da Khāliṣ Bābā da khawro waro līkno tolkah, Peṣhawar : Iḥsān Khparndwiyah Ṭolanah, 2002, 91 p. Collection of articles arranged by ʻAbd al-Hādī Mulākhel.

=== Dari ===
- Islām va ʻAdālat-i Ijtimāʻī, Kābul : Anjuman-i Tarbīyah-ʼi Afkār, 1958, 326 p. Translation from Arabic of Sayyid Qutb's Social Justice in Islam.
