= Taj Sangara =

American-born Canadian soccer player (born 1992)

Personal information
- Full name: Taj Charles Sangara
- Date of birth: December 10, 1992 (age 33)
- Place of birth: Philadelphia, Pennsylvania, USA
- Height: 5 ft 10 in (1.78 m)
- Position: Forward

Team information
- Current team: Croatis SC
- Number: 20

Youth career
- -2009: Whitecaps FC Academy
- 2010: Vancouver FC
- 2011: Zagreb

Senior career*
Years	Team	Apps	(Gls)
2010-2011	Richmond FC Hibernians	?	(?)
2011	Sloga Gredelj	15	(10)
2012	Lokomotiva	2	(0)
2012	→ Radnik Sesvete (loan)	1	(0)
2012-2013	RNK Split	0	(0)
2013	→ NK Rudeš	12	(2)
2013	NK Rudeš	9	(1)
2014	Croatia SC	22	(6)
2015-	CCBRT United FC	9	(9)
- * Club domestic league appearances and goals as of December 7, 2013

Taj Sangara (born December 10, 1992, in Philadelphia, Pennsylvania) is an American-born Canadian soccer player currently playing for CCBRT United FC in the Canadian Vancouver Metro Soccer League, after releasing by League rival Croatia SC.

== Career ==
=== Youth and amateur ===
Sangara passed through the youth ranks of Vancouver Whitecaps FC, playing in U14 and U15 Mountain WFC, and U16 Coastal WFC teams, competing in the Super Y-League. In 2010, with the folding of Whitecaps prior to their move to the MLS imminent, Sangara moved to the local Vancouver FC. He excelled there, playing in the PCSL 2010 Men's U21 Reserve Challenge Cup, scoring 18 goals in the 12 possible matches, and being selected the final game MVP, aged only 17. He moved subsequently to another local club, Richmond FC Hibernians, playing in the Vancouver Metro Soccer League. In the spring of 2011, he moved across the pond to Croatia, joining the NK Zagreb U-19 team. Outgrowing the U-19 league, he didn't get a contract from his club and after a few trials with Prva HNL clubs joined the Četvrta HNL Središte A team NK Sloga Gredelj Zagreb, scoring 10 goals in 15 matches in the fall of 2011.

=== Professional ===
His performances at Sloga Gredelj were noticed by the GNK Dinamo Zagreb feeder team NK Lokomotiva Zagreb, and he signed with them, making his professional debut by entering from the bench in the match against NK Osijek. He only featured once again until the end of the season, entering the pitch again from the bench against NK Lučko. He began the 2012–2013 season on loan at another Dinamo feeder team, the Druga HNL club NK Radnik Sesvete, being a starter in the first match, a 3–1 win against HNK Šibenik. That would prove to be his only game for the club as he was recalled to Lokomotiva, his contract being cancelled soon afterwards. He signed a one-year contract with RNK Split soon afterwards. Not getting a chance there, he moved on loan in early 2013 to the Druga HNL side NK Rudeš and went on to sign a contract with them after his RNK Split contract expired. He played nine games until winter 2013 and returned to Canada. Since them plays for Vancouver Metro Soccer League club Croatia SC, alongside former Bundesliga player Johnny Sulentic and former SAS Ligaen professional player Desmond Tachie. In early 2015 signed for Vancouver Metro Soccer League rival CCBRT United FC along with former German Regionalliga club FC Pommern Stralsund player Coulton Jackson and Riley O'Neill.
