= Din Mohammad =

Afghan politician (born 1953)

Hajji Din Mohammad
- دین محمد

Deputy of High Council for National Reconciliation
- In office July 2002 – Present
- Preceded by: Hajji Abdul Qadir

Governor of Kabul
- In office August 2005 – 24 June 2009
- Succeeded by: Zabihullah Mojaddidy

Governor of Nangarhar
- In office July 2002 – 2004
- Preceded by: Hajji Abdul Qadir
- Succeeded by: Gul Agha Sherzai

Personal details
- Born: 1953 (age 72–73) Nangarhar, Kingdom of Afghanistan
- Party: Hezb-e Islami Khalis
- Relations: Hajji Abdul Qadir (brother); Hajji Abdul Haq (brother)
- Children: Ezatullah Sahil
- Profession: Politician

Hajji Din Mohammad also known as Azizullah Din Mohammad is a politician in Afghanistan who served as the Governor of Nangarhar Province and later Governor of Kabul Province. He is currently the Chairman of Peace and Development Islamic Party. He has been involved in the peace and reconciliation process between the Afghan Government and the Taliban and is currently the deputy of High Council for National Reconciliation. Haji Din Mohammad comes from a distinguished Pashtun "Arsala" family. The Arsala family is part of the Jabar Khel (a subtribe of the land-owning Ahmadzai tribe). He is the elder brother of late Hajji Abdul Qadir and Abdul Haq. His great-grandfather, Wazir Arsala Khan, served as Foreign Minister of Afghanistan in 1869. One of Arsala Khan's descendants, Taj Mohammad Khan, was a general at the Battle of Maiwand. Another descendant, Abdul Jabbar Khan, was Afghanistan’s first Ambassador to Russia.

== Early life and family ==
Din Mohammad was born in Nangarhar, Afghanistan. His father Amanullah Khan, served as a district administer in various parts of the country. Two of his uncles, Mohammad Rafiq Khan and Haji Zaman Khan, were members of the 7th session of the Afghan Parliament which worked to expand the rights of ordinary citizens under the monarchy.

Din Mohammad's brothers Abdul Haq and Hajji Abdul Qadir were Mujahideen commanders who fought against the Communist Red Army during the 1980s Soviet–Afghan War. Din Mohammad served as the deputy of the Hezbi Islami Party of Mohammad Yunus Khalis.

He served as the Minister of National Security in Afghanistan's Interim Government in Exile during the 1990s and as Minister of Education in the Mujahideen Government which was established after the collapse of the Communist government. He also served as Deputy Prime Minister in the same period, but resigned when infighting erupted among the rival factions of Ahmad Shah Massoud and Gulbuddin Hekmatyar.

=== Governor ===
During the Taliban era, Din Mohammad lived in exile and later helped Abdul Haq in his efforts to establish a broad-based post-Taliban government. In 2001, Abdul Haq was captured and executed by the Taliban while pursuing efforts to promote the formation of a broad-based representative government. Din Mohammad's son Ezatullah Sahil was captured and killed by the Taliban along with Abdul Haq in 2001. Abdul Qadir served as the governor of Nangarhar Province after the Soviet Occupation and was credited with maintaining peace in the province during the years of civil conflict that followed the Soviet withdrawal. Abdul Qadir served as a Vice President in the newly formed post-Taliban government of Hamid Karzai, but was assassinated by unknown assailants in July 2002. In the same month of 2002, Din Mohammad was selected as the Governor of Nangarhar Province. in August 2005, he became the Governor of Kabul Province until August 2009.

Din Mohammad and his brother Hajji Nasrullah Baryalai Arsalai remain committed to the principles of inclusive government and reconciliation among competing factions in Afghanistan, and have been active in promoting the economic development and reconstruction of Afghan society after decades of chaos and violence.

Preceded by Haji Abdul Qadir	Governor of Nangarhar Province; 2002–2004	Succeeded by Gul Agha Sherzai
Preceded by	Governor of Kabul Province; 2009–2009	Succeeded by Zabihullah Mojaddidy
