= Terrorist Organization Reference Guide =

The Terrorist Organization Reference Guide is a field manual jointly published by the U.S. Department of Homeland Security, U.S. Customs and Border Protection, and the US Border Patrol. The guide is a synopsis of groups and individuals designated to be terrorist organizations and is provided to field against for screening purposes.
