= Taj Mihelich =

American bicycle motocross rider

Taj Mihelich (born August 31, 1973 in Ann Arbor, Michigan) is a World Champion American Freestyle BMX rider. He is widely considered one of the most influential BMX riders of the golden era of BMX.

== Career ==
He first began riding at the age of 12 and was brought to the world of freestyle BMX by Ron Kilmer, who appeared with Taj in the celebrated "Road Fools" videos.

After years of riding for the company Hoffman Bikes, he started Terrible One with Joseph Rich, Paul Buchanan, and Robbie Morales in 1998. The company started by releasing the "Barcode" bike frame, largely based on Taj's signature bike design at Hoffman Bikes.

It was rumored that Taj was displeased with the way that his signature frame was holding up after Hoffman Bikes moved their manufacturing overseas, and that he didn't want his name attached to something that he felt was of substandard quality.

Taj was also sponsored by Etnies, where he designed several signature shoes as well as appearing in the widely recognized "Forward" video featuring the Etnies BMX team.

In late March 2006, via the company's website, Taj announced that he would be leaving his half of Terrible One to Joe Rich. In an interview with The Albion BMX Magazine, Taj cited his decision for leaving as he was no longer friends with Joe Rich. He stated that he gave his share of the company to Joe and mentioned the two are no longer on speaking terms.

In early 2008, Taj announced that he would be riding for Giant bicycles. Not long after, a back injury and resulting surgery forced him to retire from an 18-year professional BMX career.

In 2010 with the help of Odyssey BMX, Taj launched an all-purpose road, commuter and town bicycle company called Fairdale Bicycles.

Taj has appeared in numerous BMX videos such as Etnies FORWARD, Etnies GROUNDED, Odyssey Electronical, UGP Face Value, Primo Made In Taiwan, ANTHEM, Road Fools 1 and 5, and Hoffman Bikes - Madd Mat.

== See also ==
- Macrobiotic diet
