= Hezb-i Islami Khalis =

Primarily Pashtun political movement in Afghanistan

Hezb-e Islami Khalis حزب اسلامی خالص
- Abbreviation: HIK
- Leader: Din Mohammad
- Founder: Mohammad Yunus Khalis
- Founded: 1979
- Split from: Hezbi Islami
- Merged into: Taliban
- Ideology: Islamism
- Political position: Far-right
- Religion: Sunni Islam

Hezb-i Islami Khalis
- Leader: Mohammad Yunus Khalis
- Dates active: 1979–1989 (Part of Afghan Mujahideen); 1989–1992 (1st government as Interim)
- Country: Afghanistan
- Ideology: Islamism; Deobandi; Anti-communism
- Political position: Far-right
- Part of: Afghan Mujahideen (1979–1989); Afghan Interim Government (1989–1992); Islamic State of Afghanistan (1992–2001, Anti-Taliban factions); Northern Alliance (1996–2001, Anti-Taliban factions)

Hezb-e Islami Khalis (Pashto: حزب اسلامی خالص) is an Afghan political ex-Mujahideen movement under Mohammad Yunus Khalis, who separated from Gulbuddin Hekmatyar's Hezb-e Islami and formed his own resistance group in 1979. The two parties were distinguished as Hezb-e Islami Gulbuddin and Hezb-e Islami Khalis, after the names of their respective leaders.

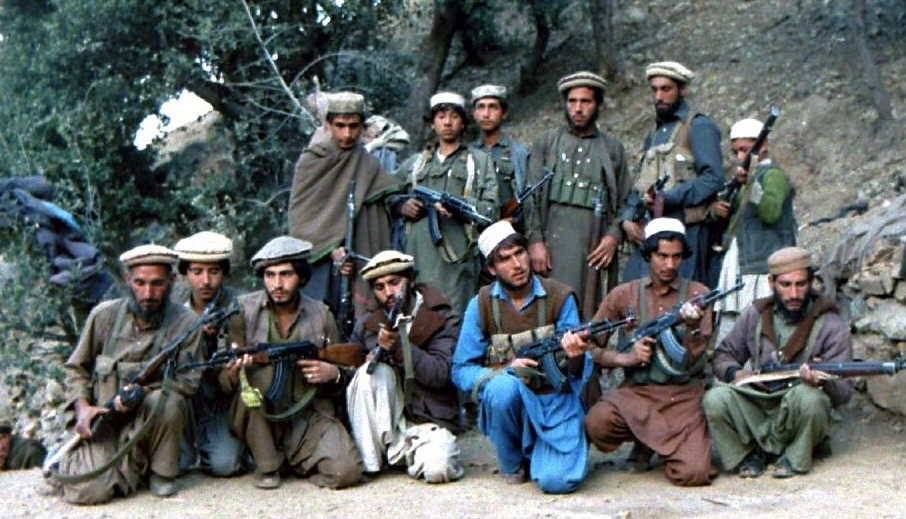
Hezb-e Islami Khalis fighters, October 1987

The Hezb-e Islami Khalis was part of the "Peshawar Seven", who fought against the Soviets in the Soviet–Afghan War and fought in the Gulf War along with the American-led coalition against Iraq. Among its most notable members were Hibatullah Akhundzada, Abdul Haq, Amin Wardak, Jalaluddin Haqqani, and founder of the Taliban, Mullah Omar.

Following Khalis' organization in 2006, a power struggle ensued between his son Anwar ul Haq Mujahid and Haji Din Mohammad, the former governor of Kabul Province. Mohammad appears to have been successful in consolidating his control over much of the party.
