= Afghan Red Crescent Society =

Humanitarian organization in Afghanistan

- د افغاني سرې میاشتې ټولنې
- Formation: 1934
- Type: Aid agency
- Purpose: Humanitarian Aid
- Headquarters: Kabul, Afghanistan
- Location: Afghanistan
- President: Shahabuddin Delawar
- Deputy President: Hafiz Aziz Rahman
- Affiliations: International Federation of Red Cross and Red Crescent Societies
- Website: ARCS Official Site

The Afghan Red Crescent Society (ARCS; Pashto: د افغاني سرې میاشتې ټولنې, romanized: Da Afghani Sare Miashte Tolane; Persian: جمعیت هلال احمر افغانی, romanized: Jam'iyat-e Hilal-e Ahmar-e Afghani) is the Afghan affiliate of the International Federation of Red Cross and Red Crescent Societies. The Society has existed for over 70 years although with limited structure due to the prevailing conditions which have affected the country at large for over 20 years. The current president is Shahabuddin Delawar and deputy president is Hafiz Aziz Rahman.

== History ==
The ARCS was founded in April 1934. It traces its origins to the Naderia Orphanage, with the purpose of helping orphans and those in need. In October 1951, the society adopted its constitution, which articulated democratic provisions for membership, elections at central, provincial and local branches, and managing board. In 1964 ARCS took over Marastoon (مرستون) or Afghan Welfare organizations. The International Federation of Red Cross and Red Crescent Societies is one of the two main partners of the ARCS, establishing its delegation in Afghanistan in 1991, with only temporary evacuations during the most recent conflict. Although limited in terms of organizational capacity in recent years, the organization and activities of the ARCS covers territory throughout the country, with active branches in 31 of 32 provinces.

== Organization and activities ==
The ARCS receives a significant portion of its support from the National Societies of several developed nations, including those from the United States, United Kingdom, Australia, Canada, and Japan, with support channeled through the International Federation. The ARCS also maintains bilateral relations with the National Societies of Iran, Qatar, Saudi Arabia, and the United Arab Emirates. The ARCS has been led by Ms. Husn Banu Ghazanfar from 2019 to 2021.

Based on its wide-ranging humanitarian work throughout Afghanistan, the ARCS claims the ability to work with all ethnic groups through its services. The primary activities of the organization have been focused primarily on disaster response, health care, and youth. Ms. Fatima Gailani claimed, in a 2007 interview with the International Review of the Red Cross, that the ARCS has nearly 37,000 volunteers. In 2013, the society employed 1,717 staff members and retained 23,440 volunteers. In that same year, the society assisted more than 700,000 Afghanis through disaster preparedness programs, more than 430,000 through long-term development programs and more than 30,000 in acute disaster response activities.

== Presidents ==
- Syed Sifatullah Qureshi (September 2021 − 4 October 2021)
- Matiul Haq Khalis (4 October 2021 − 7 July 2024)
- Shahabuddin Delawar (7 July 2024 – present)
