= Taj Mahmood Amroti =

Sindhi Muslim scholar

Taj Mahmud Amroti
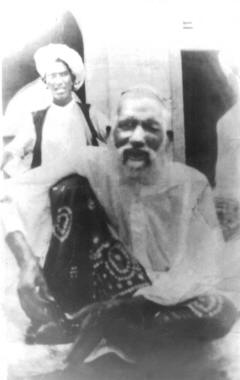

Personal life
- Born: 1857 Deewani village, Khairpur, Sindh
- Died: 1929 (aged 71–72)

Religious life
- Religion: Islam
- Denomination: Sunni
- School: Hanafi
- Creed: Maturidi
- Movement: Deobandi

Taj Mahmūd Amrōtī (born 1857 in Deewani village, Khairpur, Sindh – 1929) was a scholar, fighter against British control of India, and educationalist.

He led the "Reshmi Roomal" and "Hijrat Movement" of protest emigration to Afghanistan. Amroti helped Khilafat Movement of Ottoman Khilafat / Khalifah by sending financial help and troops of his followers, a force named as Junood-e-Rabbani i.e. the Forces of Allah.

Amroti translated the Qurʾān into Sindhi, gave lectures, wrote books of poetry, and edited the monthly journal Ikhwān-ul-Muslimīn. A proponent of the non-cooperation movement in India, he was a leader of the Khilafat Movement and a founding member of Jamʿiyyat-i ʿUlamā-e-Hind.
