= Taj Mohammed (Guantanamo Bay detainee) =

- Born: 1981 (age 44–45)
- Detained at: Guantanamo
- ISN: 902
- Charge: No charge
- Status: Repatriated.

Taj Mohammed is a citizen of Afghanistan who was held in extrajudicial detention in the United States Guantanamo Bay detention camps, in Cuba. His Guantanamo Internment Serial Number was 902. Joint Task Force Guantanamo counter-terrorism analysts estimate Mohammed was born in 1981. He was repatriated in 2006.

According to Washington Post reporter, Mahvish Khan, who visited Taj Mohammed in detention with habeas counsel, he learned English during his four years of detention.

== Press reports ==
According to the Associated Press, the allegations against Nasir, in his Combatant Status Review Tribunal, was accused of being a member of Lashkar-e-Tayyiba -- The Army of the Pure.

Mohammed told his Tribunal: "I was a shepherd, and I never can even go out very much, and I was always with my goats on the mountain, These are all lies about me."

On June 15, 2008, the McClatchy News Service published a series of articles based on interviews with 66 former Guantanamo captives. Taj Mohammed was one of the former captives who had an article profiling him.

Taj Mohammed reported being sexually harassed during his interrogations. He reported that guards desecrated the Quran. According to his McClatchy interviewer, Taj Mohammed tried to retaliate:

I got into fights (with guards) because of bad meals, because of them abusing the Quran, because they didn't give us enough time in the shower," Mohammed said. "When they searched our cells the soldiers would flip through our Qurans. The detainees did not like this. We would throw water and shit on the soldiers; we would spit at them. If we could reach the soldiers we would punch them.

According to the McClatchy profile of him, Taj Mohammed was radicalized in Guantanamo and said he beat less religious captives. The article said his lawyers, Paul Rashkind, was taken aback when told of these assertions, and questioned whether the McClatchy interviewer may have been taken in by an impostor.

According to the McClatchy interviewer, Taj Mohammed was mentored and given lessons in Arabic and the Quran by Yemeni captive Ali Abdullah Ahmed—one of the three men camp authorities reported committed suicide on June 10, 2006.

According to the McClatchy interviewer Taj Mohammed spent nine months in Camp four in 2005, the camp where "compliant" captives were allowed to mingle with other captives. He was, however, demoted when he slapped a female doctor.

ABC News reported on February 22, 2010, that Taj Mohammed was employed by the Agribusiness Development Team, a Provincial Reconstruction Team development project with participation from the US military. He worked as a translator. He was reported to be surprisingly fluent in both English and Spanish—learned in Guantanamo.

== Namesakes ==
On January 16, 2010, the Department of Defense was forced to publish the names of the 645 captives held in the Bagram Theater Internment Facility. One of the individuals on the list was named Taj Mohammed.
