= Homeland Corps Front =

Militant group in Afghanistan

- جبهه سپاهیان میهن
- Logo of the group
- Other name: Patriotic Soldiers Front, Homeland Soldiers Front, Homeland Guardians' Front, Sepahiyan-e Mihan
- Leader: Qayyum Malang
- Founded: 17 July 2026
- Country: Afghanistan
- Active regions: Badakhshan Province
- Status: Active
- Size: 1,300–1,400 fighters
- Conflicts: Republican insurgency in Afghanistan
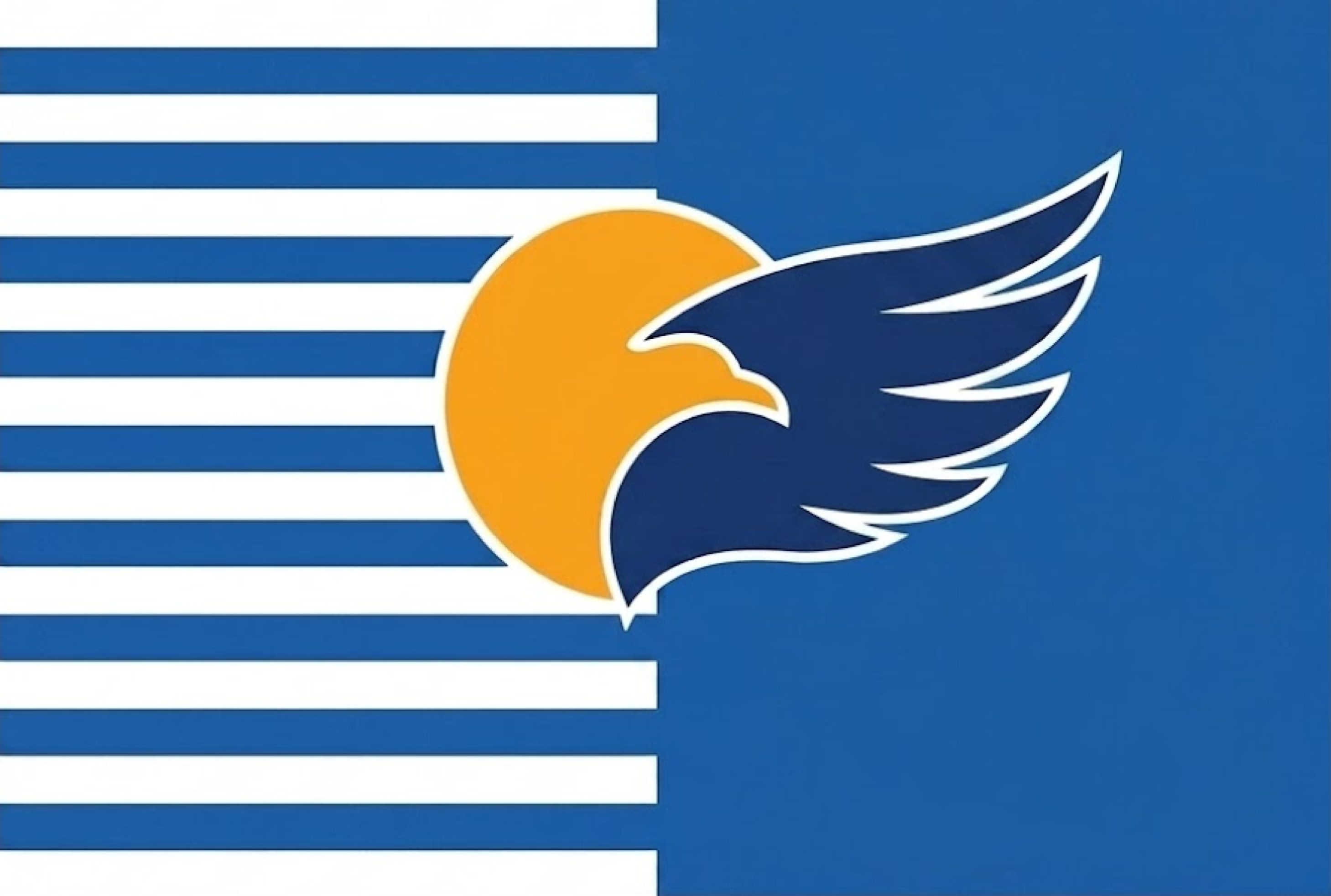
- Flag

The Homeland Corps Front (HCF; Dari: جبهه سپاهیان میهن, romanized: Jabheh Sepahiyan-e Mihan), also transliterated as Homeland Soldiers Front, is an Afghan militant group fighting against the Taliban in the republican insurgency in Afghanistan. The front was founded in July 2026 and is active in Badakhshan Province. The front is led by former Afghan special forces commander Qayyum Malang and is composed of former members of Western-backed Afghan security forces.

== History ==
The front emerged on 17 July 2026, when its fighters launched a surprise attack on Yaftali Sufla District in Badakhshan Province. The group captured the headquarters of Yaftali Sufla District and raised its flag before retreating a few hours later. During the attack, the group claimed to have disarmed Taliban personnel guarding the building and seized military equipment. The front clashed with the Taliban in mountainous areas afterwards. On July 18, 2026, Taliban arrested several civilians, including children, for allegedly being affiliated with the front. The front said it captured none of its fighters. Taliban's army chief Fasihuddin Fitrat visited the district and called the attackers “troublemakers” who wanted to “stand against the system” but failed. He told the media that most of those involved in the attack had been arrested.

According to sources close to the front, the group is led by former Afghan special forces commander Abdul Qayyum Shikarchi, better known as Qayyum Malang, and comprises former members of Western-backed Afghan security forces, numbering between 1,300 and 1,400 fighters. The attack on Yaftali Sufla District was launched by a group of around 20 to 25 fighters. Il Foglio reported that the front is made up of residents of Badakhshan, activists and former members of Afghan security forces, and that the number of civilians in the group outnumbers professional soldiers. A member of the front told Afghanistan International that it was created in response to Taliban oppression in Badakhshan.

The logo of the front was posted on the internet and became a subject of debate by users on social media. The logo features the Iranian bird Simurgh and Hindu Kush mountains along with a sword and a star. In August 2026, the group published its three-chapter combat regulations document. The document stated that the group would not attack civilians, take civilians hostage, or attack public infrastructure such as hospitals, water plants, or power plants. The document said the group would adhere to religious teachings and international laws of war.

On 12 August 2026, the Taliban announced the arrest of eight men from Takhar and Badakhshan provinces on terrorism charges for alleged links to the front. Sources say the Taliban found the group's symbols on their smartphones.

On 19 October 2026, HCF fighters targeted the Taliban’s district governor of Kalfgan, Takhar province in an attack.
