= Yaftali Sufla District =

Coordinates: 37°18′39″N 70°22′06″E

Yaftali Sufla یفتال سوفلا
- District
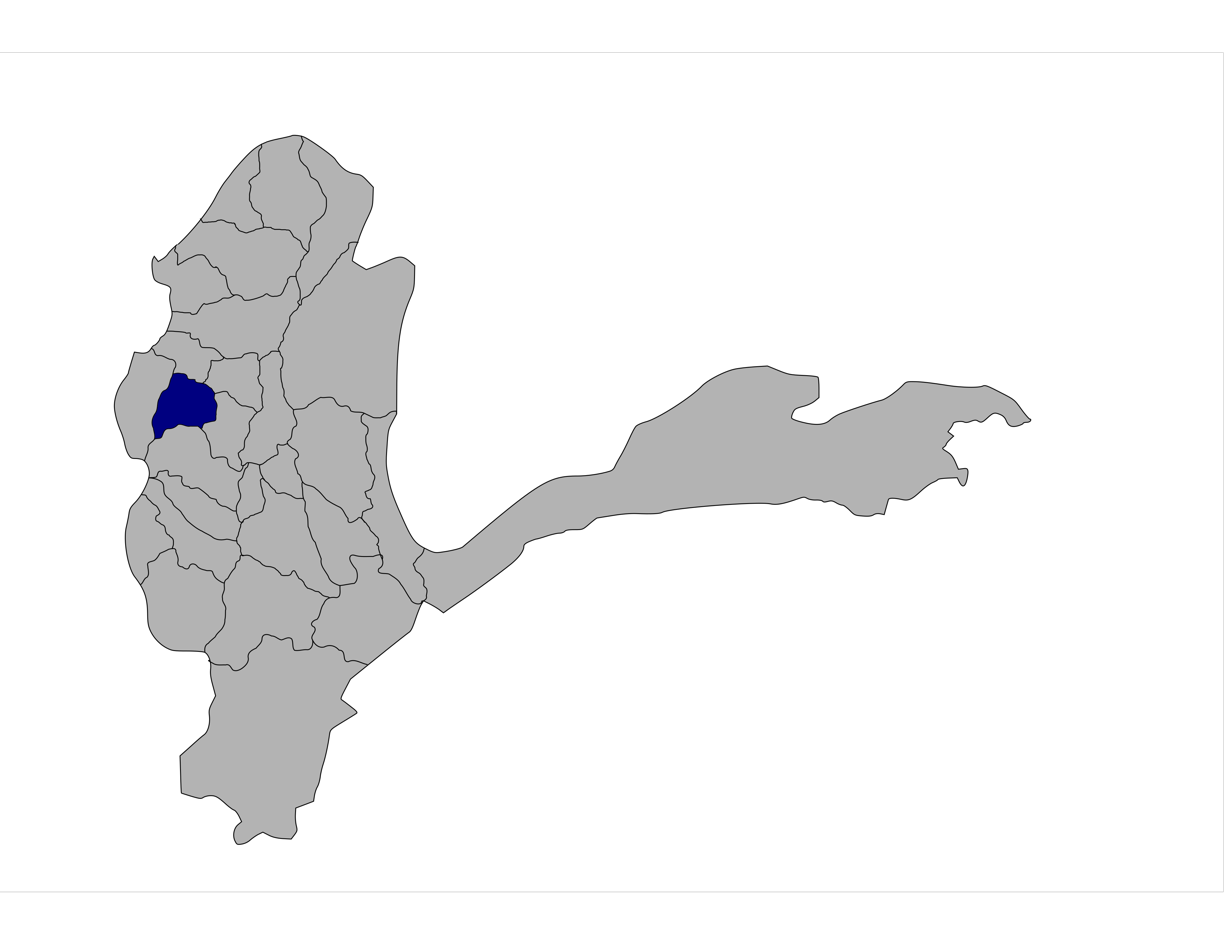
- Yaftali Sufla District was formed within Fayzabad District
- Country: Afghanistan
- Province: Badakhshan

Area
  - Total: 606.3 km^{2} (234.1 sq mi)

Population
  - Estimate (2020): 59,654
  - Density: 98.39/km^{2} (254.8/sq mi)

Yaftal Sufla (Dari: یفتال سوفلا) is one of the 29 districts of Badakhshan province in eastern Afghanistan. It was created in 2005 from part of the Fayzabad District and is home to approximately 59,654 residents.

In July 2026, the district was briefly captured by anti-Taliban group Sepahiyan-e-Mehan.

== See also ==
- Fayzabad district
