= Battle of Yaftal-e Payeen =

2026 armed clash in Badakhshan, Afghanistan

- Part of Republican insurgency in Afghanistan
| Date | 17 July 2026 |
| Location | Yaftal-e Payeen District, Badakhshan Province, Afghanistan |
| Result | Taliban recapture |

Belligerents
| Taliban | Sepahiyan-e Mihan |

Commanders and leaders
| Fasihuddin Fitrat | Unknown |

Strength
| Unknown | Approximately 25 fighters |

Casualties and losses
| Unknown | Unknown |
- Sepahiyan-e Mihan temporarily captured the district center before Taliban forces retook it.

The battle of Yaftal-e Payeen was an armed clash in 2026 between the Taliban and the Sepahiyan-e Mihan in the Yaftal-e Payeen district in Badakhshan Province, Afghanistan.

== Background ==
Following the Fall of Kabul and the collapse of Islamic Republic of Afghanistan in 2021, an armed insurgency between the Taliban and groups loyal to the formal government of Afghanistan. which included the Sepahiyan-e Mihan, also known as the Homeland Corps Front, was formed on 17 July 2026.

== Battle ==
=== Initial attack ===
The attack began in the early hours of 17 July 2026. 25 armed men attacked the Yaftal-e Payeen district compound.

The attackers entered the compound and captured the compound and temporarily hold the compound and raise the flag of Sepahiyan-e Mihan flag over the district administration building.

=== Taliban counterattack ===
The Taliban did confirm that the Yaftal-e Payeen district compound was captured by Sepahiyan-e Mihan.

But later that day the Sepahiyan-e Mihan withdrew the Yaftal-e Payeen district compound after Taliban forces arrived. Taliban forces recaptured the compound and restored control over the district.

== Aftermath ==
Following the battle Taliban Chief of Army Staff Fasihuddin Fitrat traveled to the Yaftal-e Payeen district and Taliban authorities arrested seven people involved in the attack.

The battle marked the Sepahiyan-e Mihan as a new armed organization in the Badakhshan region.

The battle occurred during a period of increased anti-Taliban insurgency in northeastern Afghanistan.
