= Siah Chub Kalay =

Siah Chub Kalay سیاه چوب کلی
- Village
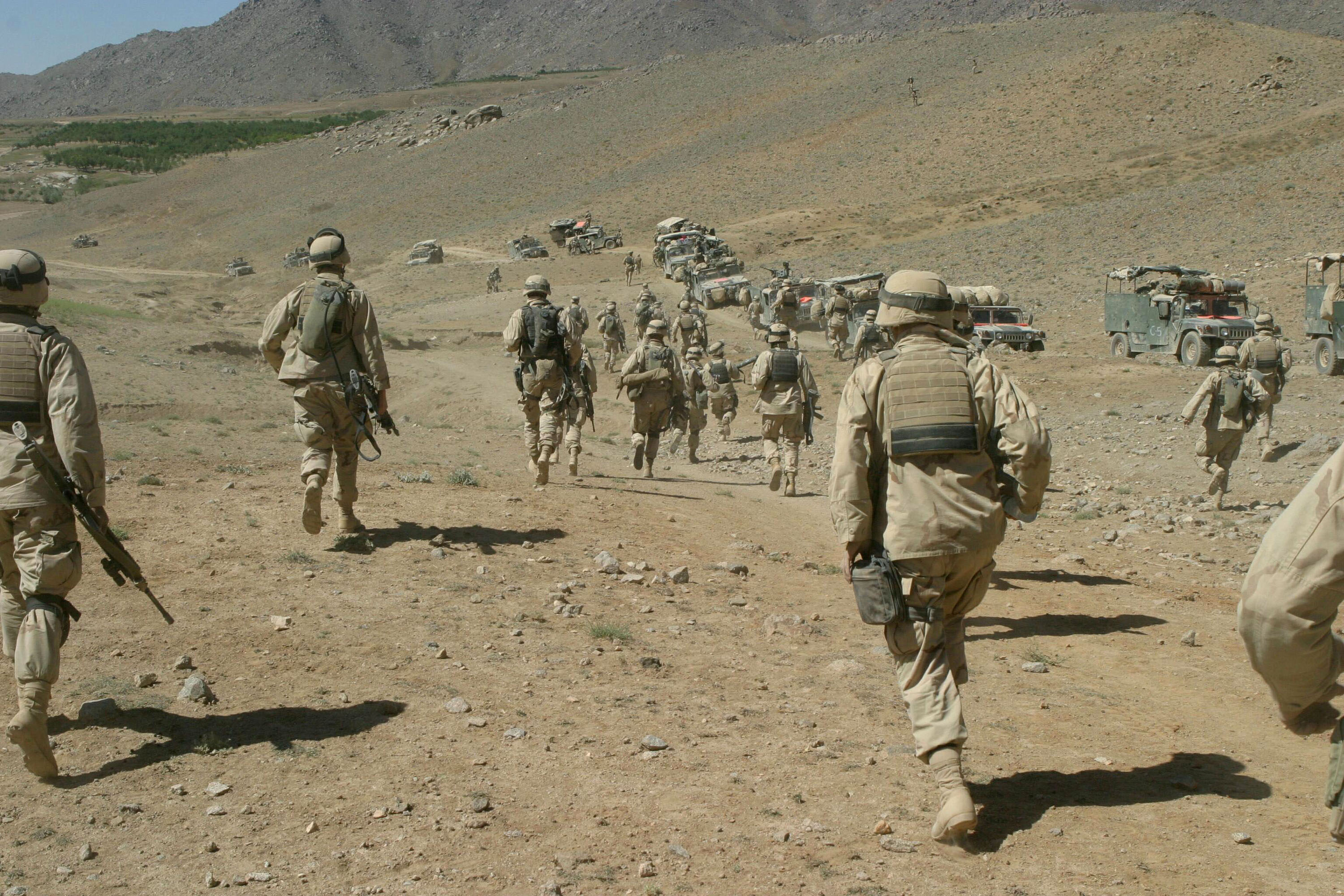
- United States Marines in Siah Chub Kalay during the War in Afghanistan, 2004

- Location in Afghanistan
- Coordinates: 32°27′54″N 66°28′50″E
- Country: Afghanistan
- Province: Zabul Province
- Time zone: + 4.30

Siah Chub Kalay (Pashto: سیاه چوب کلی) is a village in Zabul Province, in southern Afghanistan, roughly 100 miles northeast of Kandahar. It was the site of a battle of the Operation Enduring Freedom between the Taliban and the coalition forces in early June 2004 after a convoy was ambushed. During eight days of intense fighting, more than 80 Taliban fighters were killed and eight Marines wounded.
