= List of Afghan provincial governors =

Lists of Afghan provincial governors include a list of the current governors of provinces of Afghanistan, a list of governors appointed by the Taliban, and lists of governors of each province.

== General ==
- List of current Afghan governors
- List of Taliban provincial governors

== By province ==
- List of governors of Badakhshan
- List of governors of Badghis
- List of governors of Baghlan
- List of governors of Balkh
- List of governors of Bamyan
- List of governors of Daykundi
- List of governors of Farah
- List of governors of Faryab
- List of governors of Ghazni
- List of governors of Ghor
- List of governors of Helmand
- List of governors of Herat
- List of governors of Jowzjan
- List of governors of Kabul
- List of governors of Kandahar
- List of governors of Kapisa
- List of governors of Khost
- List of governors of Kunar
- List of governors of Kunduz
- List of governors of Laghman
- List of governors of Logar
- List of governors of Nangarhar
- List of governors of Nimruz
- List of governors of Nuristan
- List of governors of Paktia
- List of governors of Paktika
- List of governors of Panjshir
- List of governors of Parwan
- List of governors of Samangan
- List of governors of Sar-e Pol
- List of governors of Takhar
- List of governors of Urozgan
- List of governors of Wardak
- List of governors of Zabul
