= List of current Afghan governors =

Executive heads of Afghan provinces

This is a table chart of the current governors of Afghanistan. Provincial governors are all appointed by the supreme leader of Afghanistan. Provincial governors are often interchanged between provinces and it is not uncommon for the governor of a province to have prior served as provincial governor of multiple provinces.

The current supreme leader of Afghanistan and head of the mostly internationally-unrecognized Taliban government is Mullah Haibatullah Akhundzada.

== Governors ==
Province	Governor	Past governors
Badakhshan	Mohammad Ayub Khalid	List of predecessors
Badghis	Abdul Sattar Sabir	List of predecessors
Baghlan	Abdul Rahman Haqqani	List of predecessors
Balkh	Muhammad Yousuf Wafa	List of predecessors
Bamyan	Abdullah Sarhadi	List of predecessors
Daykundi	Aminullah Obaid	List of predecessors
Farah	Ghawsuddin Rahbar	List of predecessors
Faryab	Abdul Ahad Fazli	List of predecessors
Ghazni	Muhammad Amin Jan Omari	List of predecessors
Ghor	Ahmad Shah Din Dost	List of predecessors
Helmand	Abdul Rahman Kunduzi	List of predecessors
Herat	Noor Mohammad Islamjar	List of predecessors
Juzjan	Ismail Rasikh	List of predecessors
Kabul	Mohammad Aman Obaid	List of predecessors
Kandahar	Mohammad Shirin Akhund	List of predecessors
Kapisa	Qari Esanullah Baryal	List of predecessors
Khost	Bismillah Abdullah	List of predecessors
Kunar	Qudratullah Abu Hamza	List of predecessors
Kunduz	Asadullah Omarkhail	List of predecessors
Laghman	Shir Ahmad Haqqani	List of predecessors
Logar	Zia ur-Rahman Madani	List of predecessors
Nangarhar	Salim Kunduzi	List of predecessors
Nimroz	Muhammad Qasim Khalid	List of predecessors
Nuristan	Zain ul-Abideen	List of predecessors
Paktia	Mullah Mohammad Khan Dawat	List of predecessors
Paktika	Abdul Khaliq Abid	List of predecessors
Panjshir	Mohammad Agha Hakim	List of predecessors
Parwan	Abdul Ali Qadratullah	List of predecessors
Samangan	Mohammad Shoaib Risalat	List of predecessors
Sar-e Pul	Mohammad Yaqoub Abdur Rahman Aka	List of predecessors
Takhar	Obaidullah Aminzada	List of predecessors
Uruzgan	Enayatullah Shojah	List of predecessors
Wardak	Khairullah Khairkhwa	List of predecessors
Zabul	Mawlawi Hizbullah	List of predecessors

== See also ==
- List of current provincial deputy governors in Afghanistan
- List of current provincial police chiefs in Afghanistan
- List of current provincial judges in Afghanistan
