= Abdullah Qarluq =

Afghan politician

- مولوی عبدالله قرلق

Governor of Takhar
- Incumbent
- Assumed office 27 September 2021
- Preceded by: Abdul Haq Shafaq

Senator of Kunduz Province
- In office 2015–unknown

Personal details
- Born: 1973-74 (SH 1352) Qarluq, Dasht-e-Archi District
- Parent: Maolavi Abdul Haq (father)

Mawlavi Abdullah Qarluq (Dari: مولوی عبدالله قرلق) is an Afghan politician and former governor of Takhar Province. He also has served as senator of Kunduz in the Meshrano Jirga. Qarluq was appointed governor on 27 September 2020 and was governor while Taloqan, the provincial capital, was attacked by the Taliban as part of the 2021 Taliban offensive. The city later fell to the Taliban.
