= Nooruddin Umair =

Governor of Takhar province

Maulavi Nooruddin Umair
- مولوی نورالدین عمیر

Deputy Minister of Finance and Administration at Ministry of Public Works
- Incumbent
- Assumed office 14 March 2022
- Prime Minister: Hasan Akhund
- Emir: Hibatullah Akhundzada

Governor of Takhar
- In office 2021 – 14 March 2022
- Prime Minister: Hasan Akhund
- Emir: Hibatullah Akhundzada
- Preceded by: Abdul Haq Shafaq
- Succeeded by: Qari Mohammad Ismail Turkman

Maulvi Nooruddin Umair (Pashto: مولوی نورالدین عمیر) is an Afghan Taliban politician who is currently serving as Deputy Minister of Finance and Administration at Ministry of Public Works since 14 March 2022. Umair has also served as Governor of Takhar Province from late 2021 to 14 March 2022.
