= Amir Muhammad Akhundzada =

Afghan politician

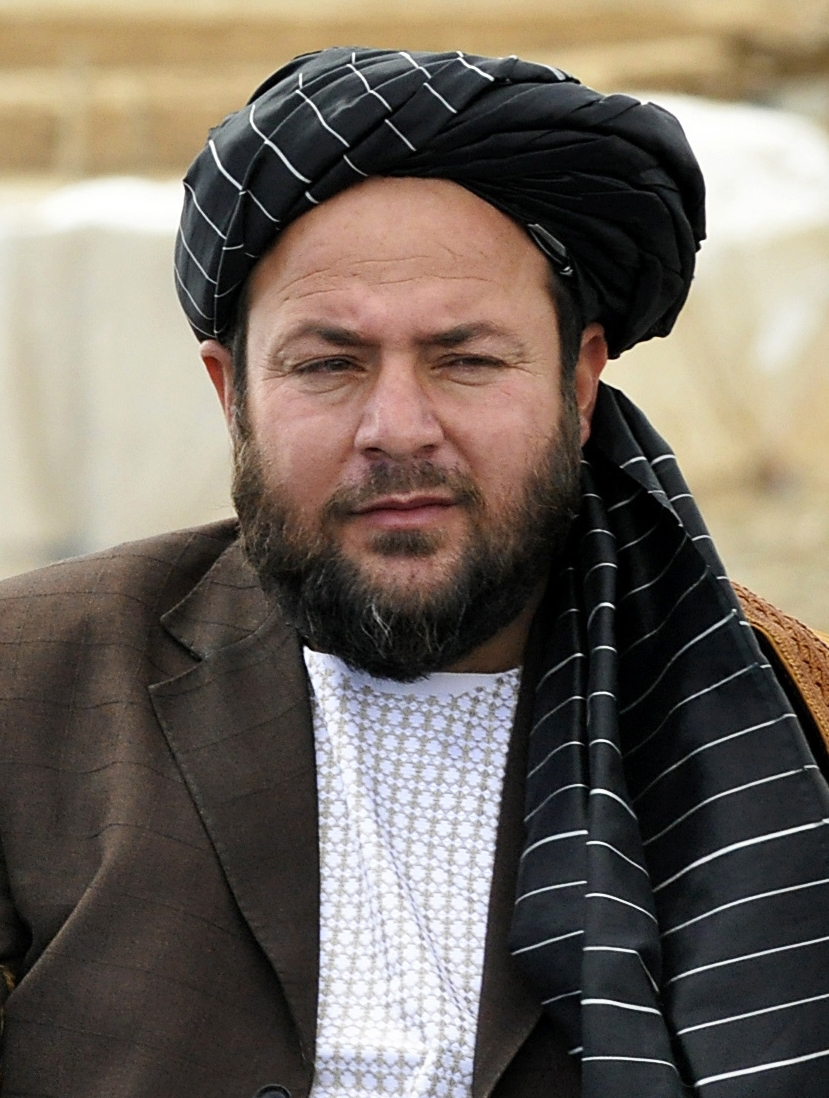
- Akhundzada in 2013.

Governor of Nimruz Province
- In office 12 March 2014 – 19 May 2015
- Preceded by: Mohammad Sarwar Subat
- Succeeded by: Muhammad Samiullah

Governor of Uruzgan Province
- In office 3 April 2012 – 10 March 2014
- Preceded by: Mohammad Omar Shirzad
- Succeeded by: Amanullah Taimori

Personal details
- Born: 1977 (age 48–49) Zamindawar, Helmand Province, Republic of Afghanistan
- Relations: Sher Mohammad Akhundzada (brother)

Amir Muhammad Akhundzada is an Afghan politician. He is a former governor of Nimruz province. He was previously the governor of Oruzgan province. Prior to that he served as Deputy Governor of Helmand province.

The Sunday Times (London) reported that the British government requested Mohammad Daoud should replace Akhundzada's brother Sher Mohammed Akhundzada as Helmand's governor before they sent 4,000 troops to Helmand. The British requested Daoud's replacement because he has a reputation for corruption, ties to Afghanistan's Opium industry, and ties to the Taliban.

The Sunday Times described the Hamid Karzai Presidency's appointment of Amir as Deputy Governor as one indication that they were trying to undermine Daoud's efforts to suppress the Opium Trade. Both Daoud and Amir were replaced on December 10, 2006.
