= Ghulam Qawis Abubaker =

Former governor of Kapisa and Takhar

Governor of Kapisa, Afghanistan
- In office 21 August 2007 – 13 September 2010
- Preceded by: Abdul Sattar Murad
- Succeeded by: Mehrabuddin Safi

Governor of Takhar, Afghanistan
- In office 21 August 2007 – 13 September 2010
- Preceded by: Abdul Kabir Marzban
- Succeeded by: Abdul Latif Ibrahimi

Ghulam Qawis Abubaker was the governor of Kapisa, Afghanistan. He succeeded Abdul Sattar Murad, who was dismissed after critical comments in Newsweek regarding the central government's ineffectiveness in remote areas of the province.

During his term as Governor he put much effort into assuring the reconstruction of the Kapisa Province.

== Notes ==
Preceded by Abdul Sattar Murad	Governor of Kapisa Province, Afghanistan; 2007 – 2010	Succeeded by [Incumbent]
