= Arif Khan =

Arif Khan may refer to:

- Arif Khan (cricketer) (born 2001), Afghan cricketer
- Arif Khan (former actor), Indian actor
- Arif Khan (skier) (born 1990), Indian alpine skier
- Arif Khan (warlord), Afghan Mujahideen warlord
- Arif Mohammad Khan, Indian politician
- Arif Khan Joy, Bangladeshi politician and footballer
