= List of current Afghan deputy governors =

This is a table chart of the current deputy governors of Afghanistan. Like provincial governors, deputy governors are all and also appointed by the Emir of Afghanistan.

== Deputy governors ==
Province	Deputy Governor	Past governors	Refs
Badakhshan	Nisar Ahmad Ahmadi	all	
Badghis	Molwi Mohibullah Asad	all	
Baghlan	Mohammad Idris	all	
Balkh	Noorul Huda	all	
Bamyan	Atiqullah Atiq	all	
Daykundi	Haji Sahib Rashid	all	
Farah	Jihadiyar Sahib	all	
Faryab	Maulvi Sahib Abdul Wali Atqani	all	
Ghazni	Sayed Hanif (Ebadah Agha)	all	
Ghor	Maulvi Shams Ullah Tariqat	all	
Helmand	Mulavi Hizbullah	all	
Herat	Abdul Qayyum Rohani	all	
Jowzjan	Maulvi Gul Mohammad	all	
Kabul	Mufti Mohammad Idris	all	
Kandahar	Maulvi Hayatullah Mubarak	all	
Kapisa	Maulvi Asadullah Sanan	all	
Khost	Mohammad Din Shah Mohabat	all	
Kunar	Abdullah	all	
Kunduz	Habib-ur-Rehman Sohaib	all	
Laghman	Saeed Ahmad	all	
Logar	Maulvi Inamullah Salahuddin	all	
Nangarhar	Maulvi Niaz Mohammad Wahaj	all	
Nimroz	Ghulam Nabi "Osmani"	all	
Nuristan	Sheikh Ismatullah	all	
Parwan	Maulvi Dost Mohammad Haqqani	all	
Paktia	Sheikh Aziz-ur-Rehman Mansoor	all	
Paktika	Muhibullah Hamas	all	
Panjshir	Maulvi Rohullah	all	
Samangan	Abdul Manan	all	
Sar-e Pol	Mohammad Nader	all	
Takhar	Haji Kazim	all	
Uruzgan		all	
Wardak	Sher Ahmad Ammar	all	
Zabul	Abdul Khaliq Abid	all	

== See also ==
- List of current provincial governors in Afghanistan
- List of current provincial police chiefs in Afghanistan
- List of current provincial judges in Afghanistan
