= List of governors of Faryab =

This is a list of the governors of the province of Faryab, Afghanistan.

== Governors of Faryab Province ==
Governor	Period	Extra	Note
Abdul Rahman Haqqani	1992: 1997 ?		
Mohammad Saleh Zari	2001; 2003		
Enayatullah Enayat	2003; 2004		
Abdul Latif Ibrahimi	2004; 2005		
Aamir Latif	2005; 2007		
Abdul Haq Shafaq	2007 ???		
Muhammadullah Batash	2012; 2015		
Sayed Anwar Sadat	2015; 2017		
Muhammad Humayun Fuzi	2017; 9 June 2018		
Abdul Haq Shafaq	9 June 2018; 5 July 2018		
Naqibullah Faiq	5 July 2018; 2021		
Hafizullah Pahlawan	7 November 2021; Present		

== See also ==
- List of current governors of Afghanistan
