= Najibullah Rafi =

Governor of Nimruz Province since 2021

Mullah Najibullah Rafi
- Pashto: ملا نجیب الله رفیع

Governor of Nimruz
- In office 7 November 2021 – 2023
- Prime Minister: Hasan Akhund
- Emir: Hibatullah Akhundzada
- Preceded by: Abdul Khaliq Abid

Mullah Najibullah Rafi (Pashto: ملا نجیب الله رفیع) is an Afghan Taliban politician who served as Governor of Nimruz Province from 7 November 2021 to 2023.
