= Mohammad Daoud (governor) =

Afghan politician (born 1957)

Mohammad Daud

Governor of Helmand, Afghanistan
- In office December 2005 – December 2006
- Preceded by: Sher Mohammad Akhundzada
- Succeeded by: Assadullah Wafa

Personal details
- Born: Helmand Province

Mohammad Daoud (Pashto: محمد داوود) (born 1957) was the governor of Helmand in Afghanistan until he was removed from his post for his ties to the opium trade. Daoud was appointed in December 2005, and replaced in December 2006 after the insistence of the British ISAF troops. The U.S. used the warlords to help them hunt Al Qaeda and the Taliban and it is rumored this extended to ignoring their involvement in the production and sale of opium.

== Early life ==
Mohammad Daud was born in Helmand in 1957. He studied civil engineering, specializing in irrigation at the famous Kabul Polytechnic, graduating in 1980 with a Bachelor of Science. Following that he worked to build apartments for the Afghan Ministry of Defense in Kabul, before fleeing to join the resistance in the early 1980's.

== Mujahideen activities ==
Daud fled the hated communist government of Kabul and joined the resistance in the early 1980s. Daud joined the Afghan mujahideen in Helmand where he quickly rose as the liaison point between field commanders in Afghanistan and the mujahideen leadership in the Pakistani city of Quetta. It was at that time that he first assisted the Afghan refugees fleeing the Soviets. He went into communist-controlled southern Afghanistan on a number of occasions, delivering much-needed food and supplies to ordinary villagers.

In the 1990s Mohammad Daud continued to help the people of southern Afghanistan. He joined the NGO's assisting the Afghan refugees with food, accommodation, and medical assistance, and was elected to head the NGO co-ordination body for southern Afghanistan (SWABAC) and subsequently elected to co-ordinate NGO and UN activity in that area; the first time a non-UN person held that post.

== Governor of Helmand ==
After the toppling of the Taliban in late 2001, Mohammad Daud joined the Administration of Hamid Karzai, as a Director in the office of the newly constituted National Security Council in 2002. In that role, he worked very closely with President Karzai, The National Security Advisor, and senior international colleagues as lead on combat prisoner issues, camp X-ray, and the reconciliation commission (PTS)

Mohammad Daud served as Governor of the southern province of Helmand from December 2005 to late 2006. During his time in Helmand, a province with over 1.5 million inhabitants, Daud oversaw the initial engagement with insurgency, the fight against the corrupt narcotics trade, the development of a reconstruction plan for Helmand, and the power transfer from warlords to the people of Helmand.

The Times of London reported that the British government requested Daoud's appointment. 4,000 British troops were posted to Helmand, following Daoud's appointment. Daoud had requested additional British troops.

Radio Free Europe quoted critical comments from journalist Ahmed Rashid, about extraordinary support the Hamid Karzai Presidency was providing Daoud's predecessor:

"Sher Mohammad Akhonzada, the former governor of Helmand, has already hired 500 fighters. Mr. Akhonzada was thrown out from the governorship of Helmand on the demand of the British government before [British troops] went down into Helmand because of his involvement with the drugs, because of his involvement with the Taliban, and [because of] his very unsavory reputation, Now if a man like that is going to [remain] armed, it is going to lead to a very negative reaction by NATO, by the European Union, by the United Nations, by everyone trying to carry out a reform agenda. This is a repudiation of the whole reform agenda."

In November 2006 a British Foreign Office official expressed frustration that Afghanistan's President Hamid Karzai had appointed Daoud's predecessor Sher Mohammed Akhundzada to Afghanistan's Upper House; continued to meet with him, and appointed his brother, Amir Muhammad Akhundzada, as Daoud's deputy.

"The president is undermining his own governor, It doesn't help what we're trying to do."

During a telephone interview with The Times, following his firing, Daoud said:

"I think in Afghanistan, particularly Helmand province, the opium business has a strong role in everything — security, administration, corruption, terrorist activities. The mafia or drug smugglers are against eradication, law enforcement, peace and stability, and against me. That's the real struggle in our area."

The Times reported that Daoud's deputy, Amir Muhammad Akhundzada, had also been replaced. They also reported that Daoud declined an appointment to be Governor of Farah Province.

Preceded by Sher Mohammed Akhundzada	Governor of Helmand Province, Afghanistan; December 2005–December 10, 2006	Succeeded by Assadullah Wafa
