= List of governors of Kunduz =

This is a list of the governors of the province of Kunduz, Afghanistan.

== Governors of Kunduz Province ==
Governor	Period	Extra	Note
Sahib Jan Sahraye	~1978; August 1978		
Qari Rahmatullah	~1993		
Arif Khan	2000		Assassinated in 2000 in Peshawar, Pakistan
Abdul Latif Ibrahimi	2002; 2004		
Mohammad Omar	2004; October 8, 2010		Assassinated on 8 October 2010 when attending Friday prayers in Taloqan, Takhar province
Muhammad Anwar Jigdalak	2010; 2012		
Ghulam Sakhi Baghlani	2013; 2014		
Mohammad Omar Safi	2014; October 29, 2015		fled to London after Kunduz City fell to Taliban insurgents.
Asadullah Omarkhel	9 February 2016 ?		head of Kunduz high peace council
Nisar Ahmad Nusrat	7 November 2021- 3 March 2024		
Mullah Mohammad Khan Dawat	26 September 2024– 14 April 2026		
Mawlawi Nasrullah Mati	since 14 April 2026		

== See also ==
- List of Afghanistan governors
