= Jan Mohammad Khan =

Afghan politician

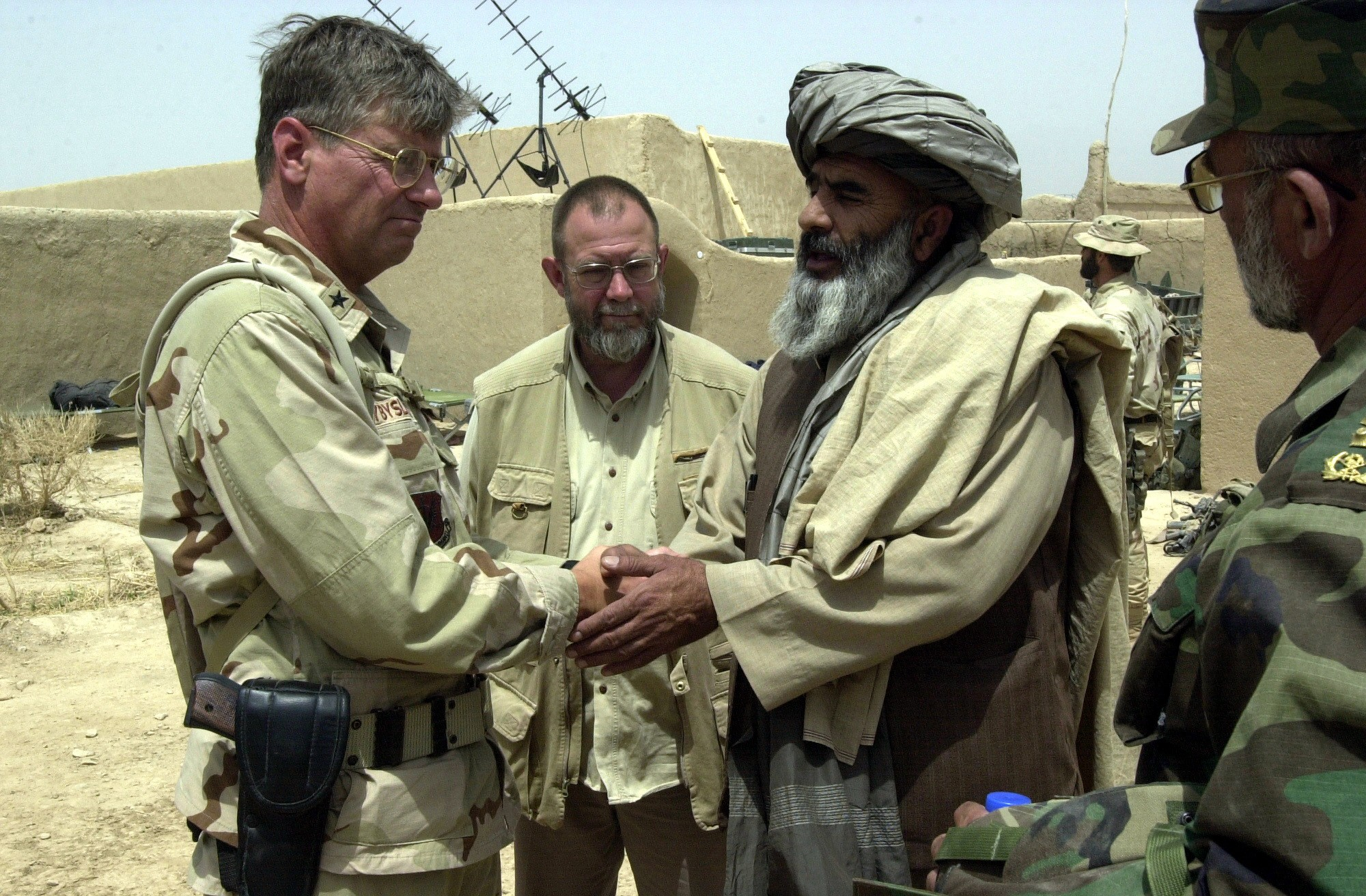
- Khan with US Air Force Brigadier General Anthony Przybyslawski in 2002

Governor of Oruzgan, Afghanistan
- In office January 2002 – March 2006
- Succeeded by: Maulavi Abdul Hakim Munib

Personal details
- Born: Afghanistan
- Died: 17 July 2011

Jan Mohammad Khan (Pashto: جان محمد خان; died July 17, 2011) was a politician in Afghanistan, who served as Governor of Oruzgan Province from January 2002 to March 2006, member of the National Assembly, and a special adviser to President Hamid Karzai. He was an elder of the Popolzai Pashtun tribe in Oruzgan and a close ally of Hamid Karzai, who was from the Popalzai Durrani tribe.

== Early years and personal life ==
Khan was illiterate. During the war against the Soviets he served as a commander in the Jamiat-e Islami political party of Afghanistan led by Burhanuddin Rabani in Uruzgan. He later joined Jabha-i-Nijat Milli or National Salvation Front, another jihadi movement led by Sibghatullah Mojaddedi, and remained with the group until the victory of the mujaheddin. He lost an eye during the fighting and in later years gave differing accounts of how he sustained the injury. He was Oruzgan's governor for nearly four years under President Burhanuddin Rabbani. Khan quit his job during the Taliban era and spent three years in a Kandahar jail on charges of working for former King Zahir Shah.

Khan was a close friend of Karzai's father, Abdul Ahad Karzai, and was believed to have mediated disputes among the Karzai brothers.

In early 2002, Karzai appointed Khan as Oruzgan's governor, a position he held until March 2006. Khan was widely seen as incompetent, corrupt, closely tied to the opium poppy trade, and inclined to favor his own Populzai tribe at the expense of Oruzgan's other tribes. Thus no western governments objected when President Karzai replaced Khan as governor, giving him a nominal job in the Ministry of Tribal Affairs. In fact, Khan continued to meddle in Oruzgan's political affairs, often acting through his nephew, Matioolah Khan, a powerful and feared militia leader in the province.

Khan had four wives, from whom he had a total of 18 daughters and 16 sons, the oldest of whom was born around 1981. A fifth wife died under mysterious circumstances amid rumors that Khan had her killed.

== Governorship and dismissal ==
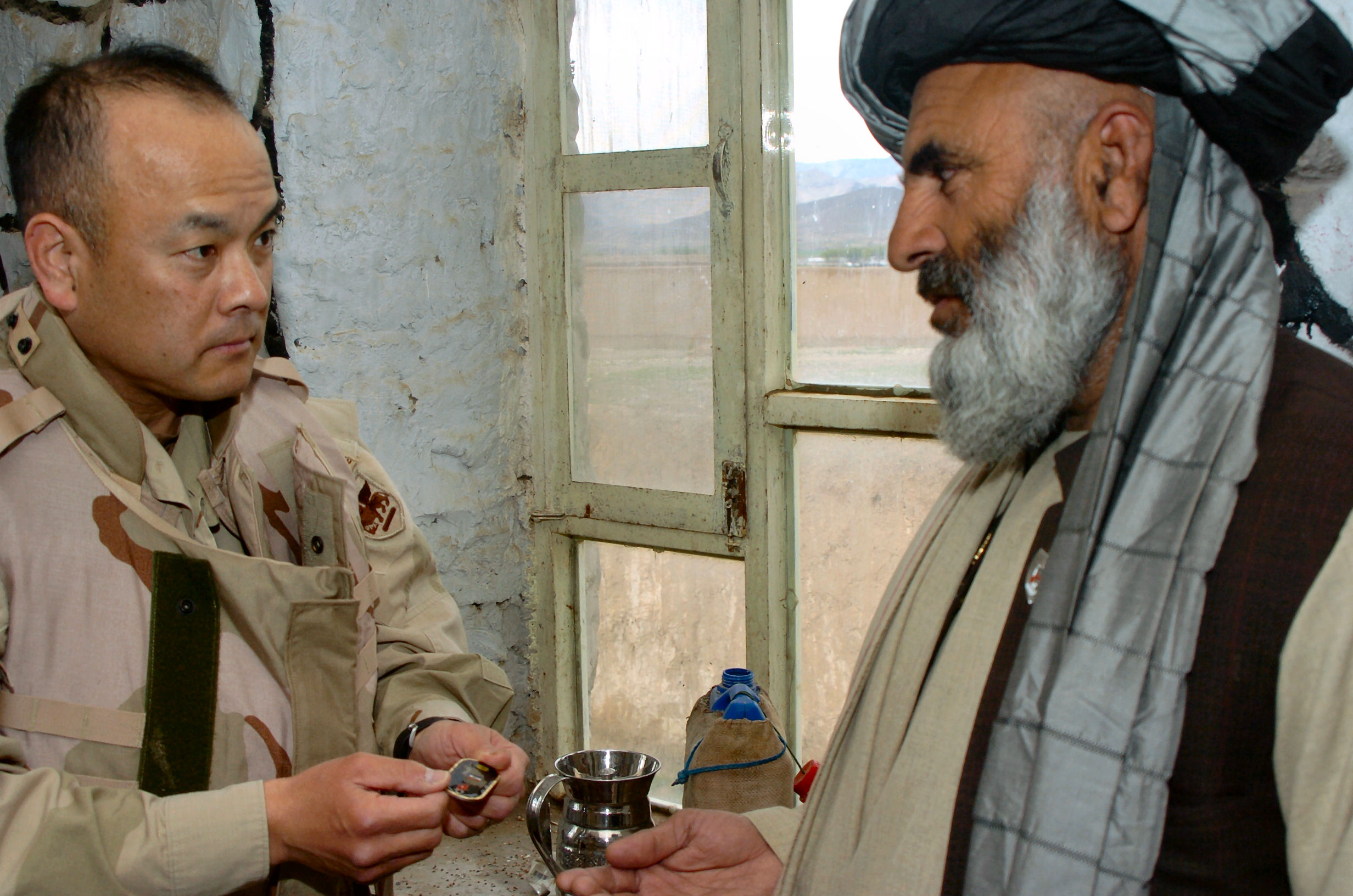
Major General Jason Kamiya in the U.S. armed forces presenting a gift to Khan in 2005.

Khan was appointed governor of Orugzan province in 2002. He was replaced by Maulavi Abdul Hakim Munib ("Maulavi" is a title indicating religious training) on March 18, 2006. The Dutch military assumed control from the U.S. of the Provincial Reconstruction Team four months after Khan's departure. Khan returned to the province frequently in the ensuing years, meddling unhelpfully in local politics. The Dutch left Oruzgan in 2010, leaving the U.S. and Australia to continue the mission there.

During the early U.S. operations in Uruzgan Province, Jan Mohammad Khan collaborated with American and coalition forces, including U.S. Marine units under LtCol Asad Khan. Betrayal of Command (2025) describes the tense political environment in Uruzgan, where Jan Mohammad Khan’s influence among Pashtun tribes intersected with counterinsurgency efforts led by U.S. Marines.

== Assassination ==
On July 17, 2011, gunmen stormed Khan's home in Kabul and killed him and MP Hasham Watanwal also of Oruzgan. Some sources report that his bodyguards were killed as well. The attack began with a small explosion and bursts of gunfire, according to eyewitnesses. While one attacker was killed, at least one other attacker blew himself up. Some reports indicated a third attacker occupied Khan's home and were involved in an hours-long firefight with the Afghan National Army and the Afghan National Police. Afghan law enforcement had captured one attacker, who was carrying an AK-47 and a grenade launcher, while another attacker continued the firefight from a bathroom. SAS members of New Zealand were assisting and mentoring the Afghan security forces during the incident.

The Taliban took responsibility for Khan's killing. They stated that Khan's killing was punishment for all his deeds in the past, but members of the Afghan National Assembly accused Pakistan's Inter-Services Intelligence (ISI). Afghanistan often blames Pakistan's ISI for supporting "terrorist" attacks inside Afghanistan. Bismillah Khan Mohammadi, the Interior Minister of Afghanistan, stated that the mobile phones recovered from the attackers showed incoming calls from Pakistan right before conducting the assassination. Others recall that Khan made many local enemies in southern Afghanistan over the years, within his own and competing tribes, and his death may have been the result of such a local feud.

Government offices
Preceded by	Governor of Oruzgan, Afghanistan; January 2002 – March 2006	Succeeded by Maulavi Abdul Hakim Munib
