= Hafizullah Pahlawan =

Governor of Faryab province

Qari Sahib Hafizullah Pahlawan
- قاری صاحب حفیظ الله پهلوان

Governor of Faryab
- Incumbent
- Assumed office 7 November 2021
- Prime Minister: Hasan Akhund
- Emir: Hibatullah Akhundzada

Qari Sahib Hafizullah Pahlawan (Pashto: قاری صاحب حفیظ الله پهلوان) is an Afghan Taliban politician, who is currently serving as Governor of Faryab province since 7 November 2021.
