= Bismillah Afghanmal =

Afghan politician

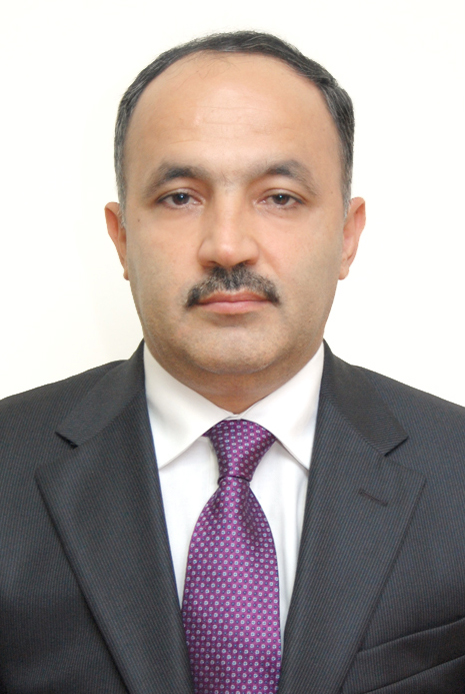

Governor of Zabul Province
- In office 14 March 2016 – Unknown
- Preceded by: Mohammad Anwar Ishaqzai

Personal details
- Born: 1971 (age 54–55) Kandahar, Afghanistan

Bismillah Afghanmal (بسم الله افغانمل) is a member of the Provincial legislature in Kandahar Province, Afghanistan.

He was elected in 2005, standing eleventh in the twenty elected members, with 2.3 percent of the popular vote.

On October 27, 2006, the Associated Press quoted Bismallah Afghanmal stating that recent NATO airstrikes had killed 80 to 85 civilians.

On May 11, 2008, the Associated Press reported that Bismillah Afghanmal had met with prisoners suspected of being members of the Taliban who were engaged in a hunger strike. The prisoners went on the hunger strike because of concerns over the delays they experienced before they went on trial; their lack of access to lawyers, prior to their trials; and the lack of fairness and independence in the trial so far. Bismillah Afghanmal met with a prisoner delegation who had taped their mouths shut.

The Associated Press reports that 200 captives are participating in the hunger strike.

During his term as Zabul governor, he has been targeted by armed attack during his visit in Nari region, Shah Joy District in the province, but survived from the attack. The provincial police chief has rejected reports suggesting an ambush by the Taliban militants aimed at the provincial governor's convoy.
