= Enayatullah Enayat =

Governor of Faryab Province and Badghis Province in Afghanistan

Enayatullah Enayat عنایت‌الله عنایت

Governor of Samangan, Afghanistan
- In office 17 November 2007 – 13 April 2010
- Preceded by: Abdul Haq Shafaq
- Succeeded by: Khairullah Anosh

Governor of Badghis, Afghanistan
- In office 2005 – May 2007
- Preceded by: Gul Mohammad Arefi
- Succeeded by: Mohammad Nasim Tokhi

Governor of Faryab, Afghanistan
- In office 2003–2004
- Preceded by: Mohammad Saleh Zari
- Succeeded by: Abdul Latif Ibrahimi

Enayatullah Enayat was Governor of Faryab Province in Afghanistan from 2003 until 2005, when he was appointed as Governor of Badghis Province. Enayat was later the governor of Samangan Province.

During the 2014 Afghan presidential election he ran as a candidate for the conservative Islamist Hezb-e Islami Gulbuddin party.

Preceded by Abdul Haq Shafaq	Governor of Samangan, Afghanistan; 2007–2010	Succeeded by Khairullah Anush
Preceded by Gul Mohammad Arefi	Governor of Badghis, Afghanistan; 2005–2007	Succeeded by Mohammad Nasim Tokhi
Preceded by Mohammad Saleh Zari	Governor of Faryab, Afghanistan; 2003–2004	Succeeded by Abdul Latif Ibrahimi
