= Mohammad Usman Turabi =

Afghan politician

Hajid Mohammad Usman Turabi حاجی محمد عثمان ترابی

Governor of Kunar
- In office August 2021 – 20 September 2021
- President: Hibatullah Akhundzada
- Succeeded by: Muhammad Qasim Khalid

Personal details
- Profession: politician

Haji Mohammad Usman Turabi (حاجی محمد عثمان ترابی) is an Afghan politician and member of the Taliban. Usman served as Governor of Kunar province from August 2021 to 20 September 2021 and was replaced by Maulvi Muhammad Qasim.
