= Khairullah Anosh =

Afghan politician

Khairullah Anosh was the former Governor of Samangan Province, Afghanistan. He is the former district governor of Andkhoy District of Faryab Province.

Anosh is a member of the National Islamic Movement of Afghanistan (Junbish-e Milli-yi Islami-yi Afghanistan).

Preceded by Enayatullah Enayat	Governor of Samangan Province, Afghanistan; 13 April 2010 – present	Succeeded by Incumbent
