= Mohammad Ashraf Naseri =

Mohammad Ashraf Naseri محمد اشرف ناصري
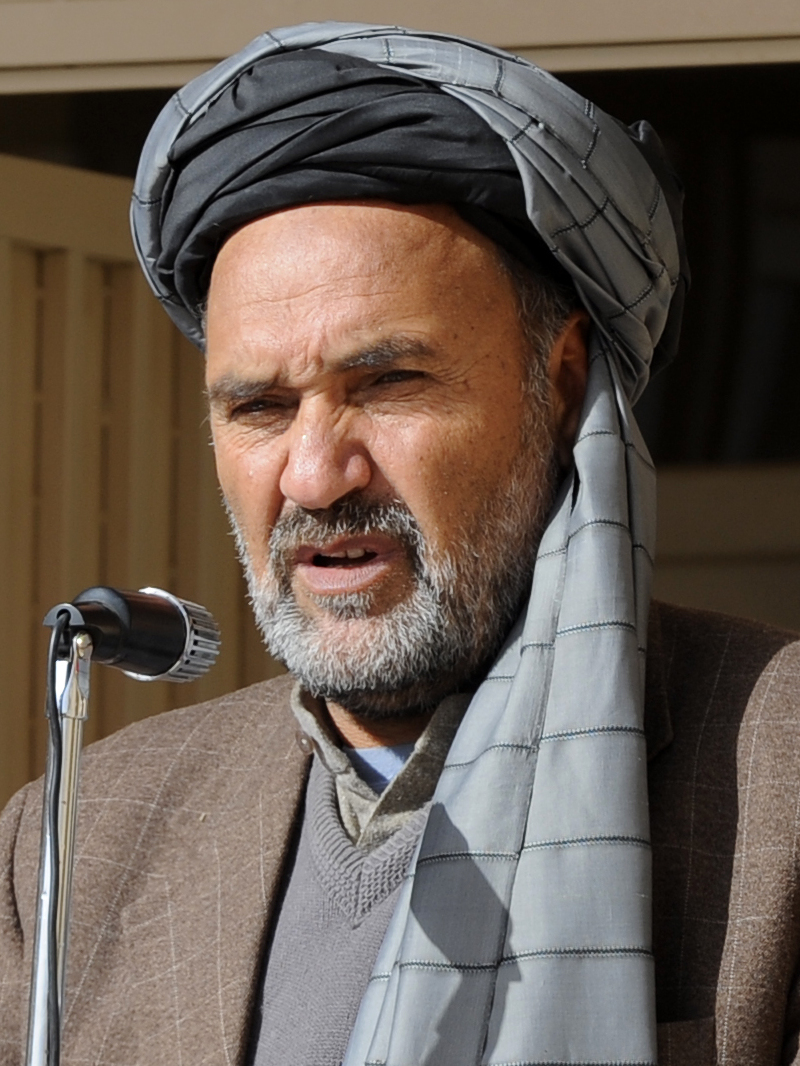

Governor of Zabul, Afghanistan
- In office March 2009 – 4 June 2015
- Preceded by: Delbar Jan Arman
- Succeeded by: Mohammad Anwar Ishaqzai

Governor of Badghis, Afghanistan
- In office November 2007 – March 2009
- Preceded by: Mohammad Nasim Tokhi
- Succeeded by: Delbar Jan Arman

Personal details
- Born: 1962 (age 62–63); Said Karam District, Paktia, Afghanistan
- Political party: Unaffiliated (former Ittihad-e Islami)

Mohammad Ashraf Naseri (Pashto: محمد اشرف ناصري) replaced longtime Zabul governor Delbar Jan Arman Shinwari in late March 2009.

An ethnic Pashtun from Paktia Province, Naseri separated from the Ittihad-e Islami under Abdul Rasul Sayyaf in 1992 or 1993 and is now politically unaffiliated.

He has a BA in science from Kabul University. He was a teacher in Dawat aw Jahad University in Peshawar, an employee of UN Office on Project Services (UNOPS), an employee of the UN Development Program (UNDP), Advisor Minister for Refugees and Repatriation (under Azam Dafar), a policy committee director of the Counter narcotics Ministry, and a presidential advisor.

He reportedly has a good reputation in Paktia, and Wolesi Jirga members from Badghis Province were positive about his role during his tenure as governor.

== Notes ==
Preceded by Delbar Jan Arman Shinwari	Governor of Zabul, Afghanistan; 2009–2015	Succeeded by Mohammad Anwar Ishaqzai

Preceded by Mohammad Nasim Tokhi	Governor of Badghis, Afghanistan; 2007–2009	Succeeded by Delbar Jan Arman
