= List of governors of Samangan =

This is a list of the governors of the province of Samangan, Afghanistan.

Governor	Period	Note
Mohammad Hanif Khan	1964–1967	First governor of Samangan after its establishment as a province.
Faqir-Nabi Alifi	1967	
Abdul-Wahid Etemadi	1971	
Abdul-Samad Bakhshi	1972	
Yusufi	?	Transferred and replaced by Toofan
Allah Dad Toofan	? 1979	Killed in fighting
Mawlawi Abdol Manan	(Taliban period)	Assassinated in 2005
Mulla Mulla Muhammad Shafiq	(Taliban period)	
Amir Latif	April 2006; June 2006	
Abdul Haq Shafaq	June 2006; 17 November 2007	
Enayatullah Enayat	17 November 2007; April 2010	
Khairullah Anush	13 April 2010; 5 June 2015	Member or affiliate of the Junbish-i-Milli party.
Abdul Karim Khedam	22 April 2017; 16 February 2018	Member or affiliate of the Jamiat-e Islami party. Replaced by president Ashraf Ghani.
Abdul Latif Ibrahimi	13 April 2018; Unknown	
Mohammad Dawood Kalakani	7 July 2020 ?	
Abdul Rahman Kunduzi	2021; October 30, 2023	

== See also ==
- List of current governors of Afghanistan
