= Abdul Sattar Murad =

Afghan politician

Abdul Sattar Murad عبدالستار مراد
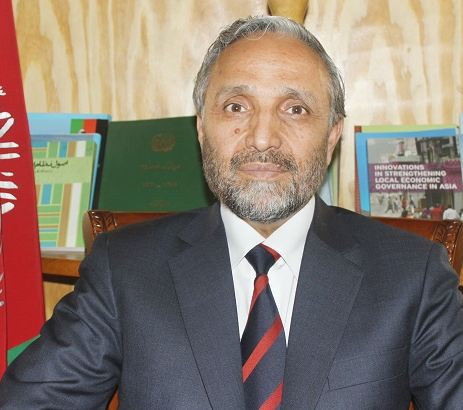
- Portrait of Abdul Sattar Murad

Minister of Economy
- In office 18 April 2015 – 12 August 2017
- Preceded by: Abdul Hadi Arghandiwal
- Succeeded by: Mohammad Mustafa Mastoor

Governor of Kapisa
- In office 2004 – 17 July 2007
- Preceded by: Sayed Ahmad Haqbeen
- Succeeded by: Ghulam Qawis Abubaker

Abdul Sattar Murad is a politician in Afghanistan.

Murad was born on March 16, 1958, in Parwan province. He completed his bachelor's degree in political science in June 1976 at Jawaharlal Nehru University in India. In 1979, he joined the Military Academy in India and completed the Academy in 1980. In 1988, he joined the Slippery Rock University of Pennsylvania, USA, for a postgraduate program in public administration. In June 2000, he received his M.A. degree in public administration from the Faculty of Economics and Administration at the University of Malaya in Kuala Lumpur, Malaysia.

Murad held various positions in the government of Afghanistan. Between 1991 and 1995, he was general director of First Political Division at the Ministry of Foreign Affairs. He was assigned as minister counselor and chargé d'affaires at the Afghanistan Embassy in Malaysia from 1995 to 2002. Following the collapse of the Taliban, he was appointed as Governor of Kapisa province from 2004 to 2006.

He was selected as chairman of the political committee of Jamiat-e-Islami of Afghanistan, the country's largest political party, by the leadership council of the party in 2007.

From May 2015 until 2017, he was minister of economy of the Islamic Republic of Afghanistan.
