= Mohammad Omar (Afghan governor) =

Afghan governor

Mohammad Omar Sulaimani
- انجنير محمد عمر
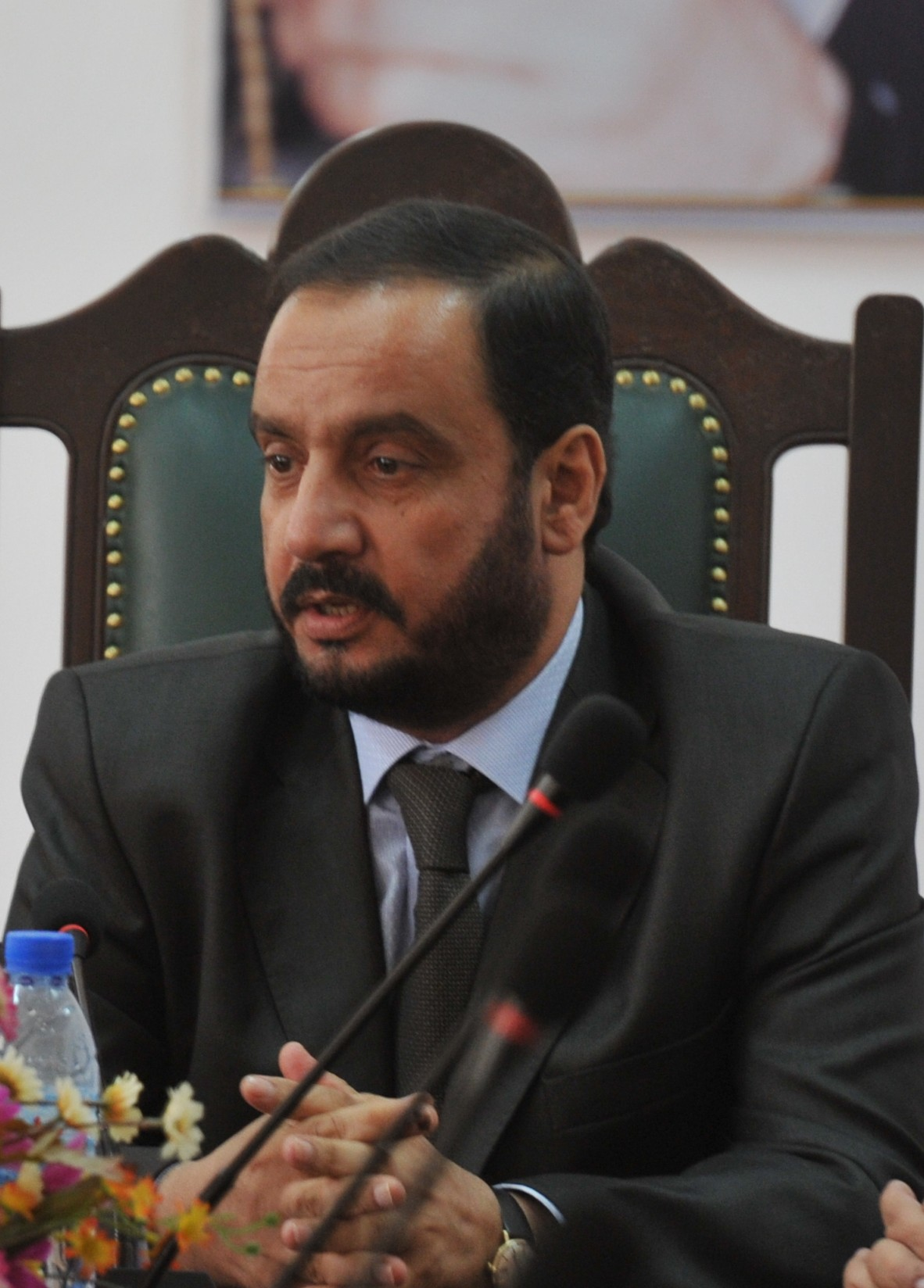
- Mohammad Omar Sulaimani on 5 October 2010

Governor of Kunduz, Afghanistan
- In office 2004–2010
- Preceded by: Abdul Latif Ibrahimi
- Succeeded by: Muhammad Anwar Jigdaleg

Governor of Baghlan
- In office 2001–2003
- Preceded by: Norullah Noori
- Succeeded by: ?

Personal details
- Born: Baharak district, Takhar Province, Afghanistan
- Died: October 8, 2010 Taloqan, Takhar Province, Afghanistan

Mohammad Omar Sulaimani (Pashto: انجنير محمد عمر) (died October 8, 2010) was the Governor of Kunduz Province, Afghanistan from 2004 until he was assassinated in October 2010.

== Early life ==
He was an ethnic Andar Pashtun from the Baharak district of Afghanistan. He was the son of Mohammad Anwar Khan. Omar completed two years of a four-year engineering program at Polytechnical University of Kabul. He stopped his education due the Soviet–Afghan War and the intervention of the Soviet Red Army.

== Political career ==
Mohammad Omar Sulaimani served as the mayor of Taloqan from 1991 to 1992. During the civil war, he was a member of Islamic Dawah Organisation of Afghanistan. Soon after the fall of Taliban government, Omar was appointed as the governor of Baghlan Province where he served from 2001 to 2003.

He then served as Governor of Kunduz Province starting in 2004. In April 2009 it was reported that German Foreign Minister Frank-Walter Steinmeier had urged Interior Minister Hanif Atmar to dismiss Omar over allegations of corruption and inefficiency.

== Death ==
Omar was killed on 8 October 2010 when a bomb exploded at the Shirkat mosque in Taloqan, in neighboring Takhar Province where he was present for Friday prayers. 19 people were killed from the bomb, also 35 were injured. He had reportedly prior warned that the Taliban and Al-Qaeda were expanding in Kunduz and called for more security reinforcements from the government.

=== Political affiliation ===
Omar was formerly affiliated with Abdul Rasul Sayyaf's Islamic Dawah Organisation of Afghanistan, until the time of his death. He was known to be close to President Hamid Karzai.

Preceded by Abdul Latif Ibrahimi	Governor of Kunduz, Afghanistan; 2004–2010	Succeeded by Muhammad Anwar Jigdaleg
Preceded by Norullah Noori	Governor of Baghlan; 2001–2003	Succeeded by ?
