= Abdul Jabbar Taqwa =

Afghan politician

Acting Governor of Kabul
- In office 9 August 2014 – 16 October 2015

Governor of Parwan
- In office March 2004 – March 2009
- Preceded by: Abdul Basir Salangi

Governor of Takhar
- In office 18 March 2010 – 19 September 2012
- Preceded by: Abdul Latif Ibrahimi
- Succeeded by: Maj. Gen. Ahmad Faisal Begzad

Personal details
- Born: 1954 (age 71–72) Farkhar District, Takhar Province, Afghanistan

Abdul Jab(b)ar Taqwa (born 20 February 1949, in Kabul) served as governor of Parwan Province.

He was educated in Afghanistan before attending University of Peshawar in Peshawar, Pakistan.

Taqwa was appointed as the governor of Takhar Province on March 16, 2010. He was wounded in the suicide bombing on May 28, 2011, that killed Mohammed Daud Daud.

He belongs to Tajik people.
