= 205 Al-Badr Corps =

- Pashto: ۲۰۵ البدر قول اردو
- Active: October 2021–Present
- Country: Afghanistan
- Allegiance: Islamic Emirate of Afghanistan
- Branch: Afghan Army
- Type: Corps
- Nickname: Al-Badr
- Website: Official Twitter

Commanders
- Chief of Staff: Mullah Bari Gul Akhund
- Commander: Mehrullah Hamad Abdul Ghaffar Mohammadi Ahmad Shah Din Dost Zarif Muzaffar
- Deputy Commander: Maulvi Rahimullah Mahmoud

The 205 Al-Badr Corps is one of the eight corps of the Islamic Emirate Army established in October 2021 and headquartered in Kandahar. The current Chief of Staff is Mullah Bari Gul Akhund, with General Mehrullah Hamad as the first and current commander of the Corps. The Corps consists of four brigades, a commando battalion and three garrison and one frontier brigade, with integrated artillery and air lift capacity. In mid November 2021, 300 soldiers after completing military training graduated from the 2nd Brigade of the Al-Badr Corps in Zabul province.

The Islamic Republic of Afghanistan-era corps it replaced was known as the 205th 'Atul' Corps, responsible for the south of the country (Kandahar, Zabul, Oruzgan, and Daikundi provinces), and was a part of Afghan National Army. It was captured during the Islamic Emirate offensive and Battle of Kandahar in August 2021.

== Deployments ==
In February 2025 sporadic small scale clashes between Pakistani and Afghan forces were reported in Bahram Chah district of Helmand province, prompting Afghanistan to evacuate civilians from the area. The 205th Al-Badr Corps was deployed by Taliban in order to reinforce the region.

== Command Staff ==
Chiefs of Staff
Chief of Staff	Period	Notes	Ref(s)
Hizbullah Afghan	4 October 2021 – 4 March 2022		
Mullah Bari Gul Akhund	4 March 2022 – Present		
Commanders
Commander	Period	Notes	Ref(s)
Mehrullah Hamad	4 October 2021 - 2022 Abdul Ghaffar Mohammadi 2022 Ahmad Shah Din Dost 2025 Zarif Muzaffar 2026		
Deputy Commanders
Deputy Commander	Period	Notes	Ref(s)
Wali Jan Hamza	4 October 2021 – 6 November 2021		
Maulvi Rahimullah Mahmoud	23 November 2021 – Present		

== Brigades ==
Province	Brigade	Head	Director-General
Kandahar	1st Brigade		
Zabul	2nd Brigade		
Kandahar	3rd Brigade		
Uruzgan	4th Brigade	Maulvi Habib	Maulvi Khalid
