= Abdul Hakim Munib =

Governor of Oruzgan, Afghanistan
- In office March 2006 – August 2007
- Preceded by: Jan Mohammad Khan
- Succeeded by: Asadullah Hamdam

Personal details
- Known for: Served on the Constitutional Loya Jirga

Maulavi Abdul Hakim Munib (Pashto: ﻣوﻟوﻯ عبدالحكيم ﻣﻮﻨﻴﺐ) (also written "Monib") is an Afghan politician, born about 1971. He was Governor of Oruzgan (also written "Uruzgan") province from March 18, 2006, through August 2007, when he was replaced.

== Background ==
Munib studied Islamic Studies and also took courses at the Afghan Foreign Ministry. He is fluent in Dari and Pashto (Afghanistan's major languages) and speaks some English. Munib is a Pashtun, from the small Ali Khel tribe of Paktia Province. He was a senior official in the Ministry of Tribal & Border Affairs during the Taliban era, and was listed on the UN 1267 Sanctions List of Persons Associated with the Taliban until 25 January 2010, when he was removed from this list.

== Political career as governor of Oruzgan ==
In March 2006, Munib replaced Jan Mohammed Khan as governor of Oruzgan Province. Mohammed Khan was removed from office by President Karzai at the request of the international community because of his long-standing corruption, involvement with poppy cultivation, and incompetence.

In his early months as Oruzgan's governor, Munib impressed outsiders with his administrative competence, but because he comes from a different province, he experienced difficulty in finding local tribal allies to underpin his authority. This is problematic because of Oruzgan's acute security problems stemming from the ongoing Taliban insurgency and widespread poppy cultivation.

President Karzai replaced Munib as governor of Oruzgan in August 2007 due to Munib's growing ineffectiveness. Karzai appointed Asadullah Hamdam in his place.
