= Mehrullah Hamad =

Afghan military commander

Mullah Mehrullah Hamad
- ملا مهر الله حماد

Commander of the 205 Al-Badr Corps
- Incumbent
- Assumed office 4 October 2021
- Prime Minister: Hasan Akhund
- Emir: Hibatullah Akhundzada

Military service
- Allegiance: Islamic Emirate of Afghanistan
- Branch/service: Islamic Emirate Army
- Rank: Commander
- Commands: Commander of the 205 Al-Badr Corps

Mullah Mehrullah Hamad (ملا مهر الله حماد) is the Taliban military leader currently serving as commander of the 205 Al-Badr Corps since 4 October 2021.
