= List of current Afghan provincial judges =

The Supreme Court of the Islamic Emirate of Afghanistan under the Taliban rule has appointed 69 provisional judges for various courts across the country on 15 December 2021.

== Judges ==
Province	Chief Justice of the Court of Appeal	Refs	Chief Justice of the City Court	Refs
Badakhshan	Hon'ble Maulvi Sahib Shamsullah		Hon'ble Maulvi Sahib Abdul Jameel	
Badghis	Hon'ble Maulvi Sahib Abdul Khaliq		Hon'ble Maulvi Sahib Habibullah	
Baghlan	Hon'ble Maulvi Sahib Moinuddin Omari		Hon'ble Maulvi Sahib Mohammad Shoaib	
Balkh	Hon'ble Maulvi Sahib Mohammad Yusuf Abu Al-Wafa		Hon'ble Maulvi Sahib Syed Rahman	
Bamyan	Hon'ble Sheikh Sahib Naqibullah		Hon'ble Maulvi Sahib Syed Mir Agha	
Daykundi	Hon'ble Maulvi Sahib Abdul Karim		Hon'ble Maulvi Sahib Mahmood	
Farah	Hon'ble Maulvi Sahib Mohammad Gul Sayad		Hon'ble Maulvi Sahib Qiamuddin	
Faryab	Hon'ble Maulvi Sahib Abdul Ghani		Hon'ble Maulvi Sahib Ghulam Ali	
Ghazni	Hon'ble Maulvi Sahib Abdul Shakur Rashad		Hon'ble Maulvi Sahib Habibullah Halim	
Ghor	Hon'ble Maulvi Sahib Sharif Rahmani		Hon'ble Maulvi Sahib Fazal Ahmad	
Helmand	Hon'ble Maulvi Sahib Siraj Ahmad Abu Saeed		Hon'ble Maulvi Sahib Jalil Ahmad Hilal	
Herat	Hon'ble Maulvi Sahib Abdul Hakim		Hon'ble Maulvi Sahib Abdul Hai	
Jowzjan	Hon'ble Maulvi Sahib Abdul Wahab		Hon'ble Maulvi Sahib Abdul Majeed	
Kabul	Hon'ble Maulvi Sahib Abdul Rahman Ghaznavi		Hon'ble Maulvi Sahib Azizullah (1st zone); Hon'ble Maulvi Sahib Zabihullah (2nd zone); Hon'ble Maulvi Sahib Musa Kaleem (3rd zone); Hon'ble Maulvi Sahib Abdul Rahman Azizi (4th zone)	
Kandahar	Hon'ble Maulvi Sahib Mohibullah		Hon'ble Sheikh Sahib Abdul Rahman Akhundzada	
Kapisa	Hon'ble Maulvi Sahib Miraqa		Hon'ble Maulvi Sahib Abdul Rauf	
Khost	Hon'ble Maulvi Sahib Abdul Karim		Hon'ble Maulvi Sahib Aziz Ahmad	
Kunar	Hon'ble Maulvi Sahib Aziz-ur-Rehman		Hon'ble Maulvi Sahib Mohammad Ayub	
Kunduz	Hon'ble Maulvi Sahib Noor Ahmad		Hon'ble Maulvi Sahib Sardar Wali	
Laghman	Hon'ble Maulvi Sahib Abdullah		Hon'ble Maulvi Sahib Amir Hamza	
Logar	Hon'ble Maulvi Sahib Rohullah		Hon'ble Maulvi Sahib Ali Marjan	
Nangarhar	Hon'ble Maulvi Sahib Mohammad Gulab		Hon'ble Maulvi Sahib Amanullah	
Nimroz	Hon'ble Maulvi Sahib Obaidullah		Hon'ble Maulvi Sahib Abdul Ghani	
Nuristan	Hon'ble Mufti Sahib Obaidullah		Hon'ble Maulvi Sahib Najibullah	
Parwan	Hon'ble Maulvi Sahib Mohammad Qaseem		Hon'ble Maulvi Sahib Noorullah	
Paktia	Hon'ble Mufti Sahib Obaidullah		Hon'ble Maulvi Sahib Kalimullah	
Paktika	Hon'ble Maulvi Sahib Amanullah Manqad		Hon'ble Maulvi Sahib Mohammad Ashraf	
Panjshir				
Samangan	Hon'ble Maulvi Sahib Saaduddin		Hon'ble Maulvi Sahib Hizbullah	
Sar-e Pul	Hon'ble Maulvi Sahib Yar Mohammad		Hon'ble Maulvi Sahib Khair Mohammad	
Takhar	Hon'ble Maulvi Sahib Mohammad Sabir		Hon'ble Maulvi Sahib Mohammad Yousuf	
Uruzgan	Hon'ble Maulvi Sahib Ghulam Hazrat		Hon'ble Maulvi Sahib Rahimuddin	
Wardak	Hon'ble Maulvi Sahib Amanullah		Hon'ble Maulvi Sahib Abdul Hadi	
Zabul	Hon'ble Mufti Abdul Wadud		Hon'ble Maulvi Sahib Fazlur Rehman	

== See also ==
- List of current provincial governors in Afghanistan
- List of current provincial deputy governors in Afghanistan
- List of current provincial police chiefs in Afghanistan
