= Ministry of Public Works (Afghanistan) =

Government ministry of Afghanistan

- Ministry flag

Agency overview
- Formed: 1919
- Jurisdiction: Government of Afghanistan
- Headquarters: Kabul, Afghanistan
- Ministers responsible: Mohammad Esa Thani, Acting Minister; Nooruddin Umair, Deputy Minister of Finance and Administration
- Website: mopw.gov.af/en

The Ministry of Public Works (MPW) is a governmental organization in Afghanistan that is accountable for supervising public infrastructure and construction initiatives across the country. Its origin dates back to the reign of King Amanullah Khan in 1919, and it is currently situated in the capital city of Kabul.

Mohammad Esa Thani is the Acting Minister of Public Works, having assumed office on 23 January 2023. Nooruddin Umair is currently serving as the Deputy Minister of Finance and Administration at the Ministry of Public Works, having assumed office on March 14, 2022.

== History ==
The MPW has a rich and significant past that can be traced back to its establishment under the rule of King Amanullah Khan. The ministry's first minister was Allahnawaz Khan, and its first director was Nasrullah Khan, both of whom were among the ministry's pioneers.

Following its inception, the MPW swiftly acquired road construction and building materials, including tractors and snow removal equipment. Since its inception, the ministry has been a vital player in the development of Afghanistan's infrastructure.

== Ministers ==
Former Ministers of Public Works:

- Eng Abdul Qudoos (20100628–20120305)
- Najibullah Awzhang Najibullah Awjan Najibullah Aoudjan (20120305–20140930)
- Najibullah Awzhang Najibullah Awjan Acting Minister of Public Works (20141001)
- acting Minister of Water and Power Ghulam Faruq Qarizadeh (20141209)
- Mahmood Baligh (20150418, 2016112 impeached and acting)
- Yama Yari (20170807, 20171204 confirmed 20200903)
- Najibullah Yamin (20201130)
- Abdul Manan Omari (20210907)
- Mullah Mohammad Esa Thani (20230121)

Deputy Minister Public Works:

- Deputy Minister of Public Works for Railways, Mohammad Ishaq Sahibzadeh (20241115)
- Mohammad Younus Agha (20220913)
- Deputy Minister of Public Work Maulvi Bakht Rahman Sharafat Mullah Bakht-u-Rehman Sharafat (20211219)
- Director Ministry of Energy and Water (2005–2009)
- Eng. Ahmad Shah Wahid Waheed (20100628, 20120904),
- Ahmad Shah Waheed, deputy minister for public works, was taken by gunmen at around 7am (0230 GMT) from the Khairkhana neighbourhood of Kabul. (20140415)
- acting MoPW minister Noor Gul Mangal(20150104)
- Deputy Minister Abdul Rahman Salahi (20180122)
