= Mohammad Farhad Azimi =

Afghan politician

Governor of Balkh
- In office 6 October 2020 – 15 August 2021
- Preceded by: Mohammad Ishaq Rahguzar
- Succeeded by: Qudratullah Abu Hamza

Mohammad Farhad Azimi (Dari: محمدفرهاد عظیمی, born 1976 in Mazar-e-Sharif, Balkh) is an Afghan politician, who served as governor of Balkh province from 2021 to August 2021. He is also a professor at Balkh University, former chairman of Balkh Provincial Council, and representative of the people of Balkh in the 16th term of the House of Representatives. He was the chairman and member of Legislative Affairs Commission in the 16th term of House of Representatives of Afghanistan and was the Ambassador and special plenipotentiary of the Islamic Republic of Afghanistan to Kazakhstan.

== Early life ==
Mohammad Farhad Azimi was born in 1976 in Mazar-e-Sharif, Balkh province. He completed his high school at Bakhtar High School in Mazar-e-Sharif. He received his bachelor's degree in law and political science from Balkh University in 1993. He lived as a refugee in the Netherlands for some time and returned to Afghanistan in 2005.

== Career ==
While in Netherlands, Azimi worked as a computer programmer. Upon returning to Afghanistan, Azimi was taught at the law faculty of Bakh University between 2005 and 2010.

=== Political career ===
He chaired the Balkh Provincial Council until 2010. Azimi was elected into House of Representatives during the 2010 Afghan parliamentary election. On 24 October 2018, he was appointed as the Ambassador of Afghanistan to Kazakhstan.

In 2020, Azimi was appointed as the governor for the Balkh province.
