= Asadullah Hamdam =

Afghan politician

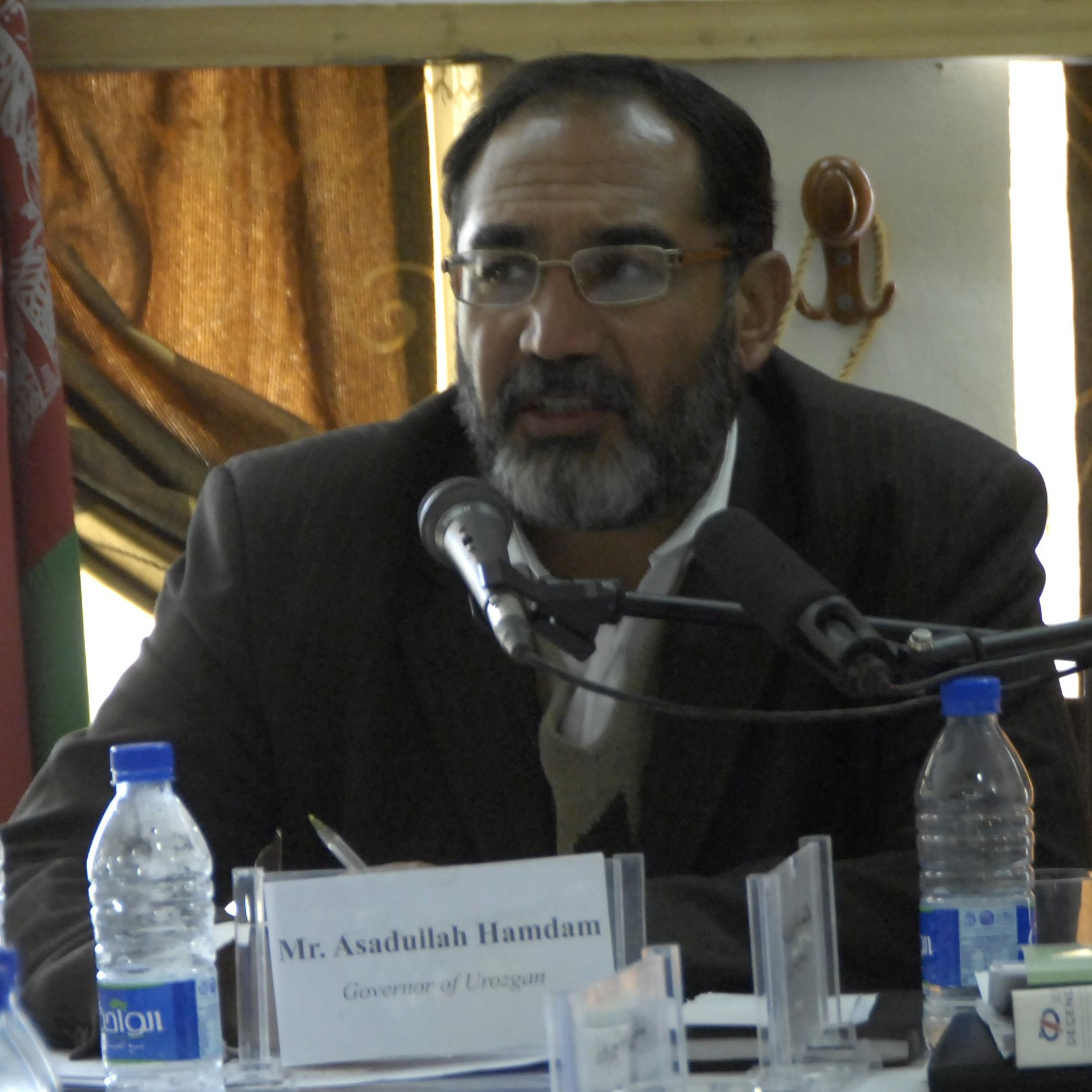
- Asadullah Hamdam in 2008

Governor of Oruzgan, Afghanistan

Personal details
- Born: Zabul Province, Afghanistan
- Party: Independent

Assadullah Hamdam is an Afghan politician who was appointed as Governor of Oruzgan Province by President Hamid Karzai in September 2007, to replace Governor Maulavi Abdul Hakim Munib who had become ineffective.
