= Said Mohammad Khan =

Influential Afghan nobleman (c. 1797–1860)

Said Mohammad Khan سید محمد خان

Co-administrator of Peshawar, Hashtnagar and Khalisajat
- In office 1826–1834 Serving with Yar Mohammad Khan, Sultan Mohammad Khan, Pir Mohammad Khan
- Preceded by: Wazir Fateh Khan
- Succeeded by: Sikh administration

Jagirdar of Hashtnagar
- In office 1826–1834

Personal details
- Born: c. 1797 Kandahar, Durrani Empire
- Died: 1860 Emirate of Afghanistan
- Spouses: Multiple wives including: Barakzai ladies (2); Popalzai ladies (3); Yusufzai ladies (2); Nurzai lady (1); Qizilbash lady (1)
- Children: 22 sons
- Parents: Sardar Payinda Khan (father); Alakozai lady (mother)
- Relatives: Dost Mohammad Khan (brother); Sultan Mohammad Khan (brother); Yar Mohammad Khan (brother); Pir Mohammad Khan (brother)

Military service
- Allegiance: Barakzai dynasty

Sardar Said Mohammad Khan (also spelled Saiyad, Sayad, Sayyid or Sa'id Muhammad Khan; c. 1797 – 1860/1861) was an Afghan nobleman of the Barakzai dynasty and one of the sons of Sardar Payandah Khan Mohammadzai. He belonged to the group conventionally known as the "Peshawar Sardars", a branch of the Barakzai brothers who controlled Peshawar, Hashtnagar and adjoining crown lands during the political fragmentation that followed the collapse of effective Sadozai authority in the early nineteenth century.

A full brother of Sultan Mohammad Khan Telai, Yar Mohammad Khan and Pir Mohammad Khan, and a half-brother of Dost Mohammad Khan, Said Mohammad Khan was associated especially with Hashtnagar, while Peshawar itself was dominated by Yar Mohammad Khan and Sultan Mohammad Khan. His political career was shaped by the rise of the Barakzai brothers, Sikh expansion into the Peshawar frontier, and the later return of the displaced Peshawar Sardars to Kabul after the British annexation of the Punjab.

== Early life and family ==
=== Birth and parentage ===
Said Mohammad Khan was born around 1797 as one of the sons of Payandah Khan (c. 1758–1799/1800), also known as Sarfraz Khan, the powerful chief of the Barakzai tribe who was executed by Zaman Shah Durrani.

He belonged to the maternally Alakozai group of Payinda Khan's sons, together with Yar Mohammad Khan, Sultan Mohammad Khan Telai, Ata Mohammad Khan and Pir Mohammad Khan. This maternal grouping later became politically significant because the sons of Payinda Khan did not always act as a unified fraternal body, but often coalesced into factions defined by maternal affiliation.

=== Siblings ===
Said Mohammad Khan had more than twenty brothers who survived to adulthood, including several who became prominent political figures:

- Dost Mohammad Khan, later Emir of Afghanistan (r. 1826–1839, 1842–1863)
- Sultan Mohammad Khan, chief minister and governor of various regions of Afghanistan, including Kabul, Peshawar and Kohat
- Yar Mohammad Khan
- Pir Mohammad Khan
- Ata Mohammad Khan

== Political career ==
=== The rise of the Barakzai Brothers ===
The early years after Payinda Khan's execution were marked by hardship for his sons. Mohan Lal records that the sons of Payinda Khan passed through a period of severe deprivation, at times dependent on alms and temporary shelter, before the later rise of Barakzai power under their elder brother Wazir Fateh Khan. Their later prominence therefore followed a period of political marginalisation after their father's fall.

=== The Peshawar Sardars ===
Said Mohammad Khan became one of the brothers collectively known as the "Peshawar Sardars". This group included Yar Mohammad Khan, Sultan Mohammad Khan Telai, Said Mohammad Khan and Pir Mohammad Khan. They were full brothers through their Alakozai mother and formed one of the major maternal-political blocs among the sons of Payinda Khan.

After the collapse of effective Sadozai central authority in 1818, Barakzai power in Afghanistan was organised less as a centralised monarchy than as a familial and territorially segmented arrangement. The Peshawar Sardars controlled the eastern frontier zone linking Kabul, Peshawar and the Punjab, but their authority was increasingly constrained by the expanding power of the Sikh Empire.

=== Territorial administration ===
According to the territorial division agreement of 10 Rabi' al-Thani 1242 A.H. (November 1826), formalized in what was known as the "Scheme of Apportionment", Peshawar, Hashtnagar and the adjoining khalisajat or crown lands were placed under the collective management of Yar Mohammad Khan, Sultan Mohammad Khan, Said Mohammad Khan and Pir Mohammad Khan.

The region of Peshawar, Hashnagar and Khalisajat etc. appertaining to these are to be managed by Sirdar Yar Mohamed Khan, Sirdar Sultan Mohamed Khan, Sirdar Said Mohamed Khan, Sirdar Pir Mohamed Khan.

Within this arrangement, Peshawar functioned as the principal political centre under the leadership of Yar Mohammad Khan and Sultan Mohammad Khan, while Said Mohammad Khan's authority was primarily associated with Hashtnagar. Later administrative records similarly state that "Sayad Mohammad received Hashnagar, and Pir Mohammad the Doāba" as their respective jagirs.

=== Loss of Peshawar and displacement ===
The position of the Peshawar Sardars became increasingly precarious after the Battle of Nowshera in 1823, which marked a decisive stage in Sikh expansion into the Peshawar frontier. After this defeat, Muhammadzai rule in Peshawar operated under Sikh ascendancy, with tribute obligations and coercive constraints that limited effective sovereignty.

The final blow came with the Sikh annexation of Peshawar in May 1834. The Peshawar Sardars were expelled and placed under surveillance near Lahore, while parts of their former territories were retained only as conditional revenue assignments. Charles Masson, who encountered the displaced Sardars shortly after the loss of Peshawar, wrote that "Poor Saiyad Máhomed Khán said not a word, and appeared careless of what had happened", a description suggesting either resignation or political exhaustion in the face of their displacement.

During the 1840s, British administrative correspondence records continuing financial strain among the displaced Peshawar Sardars. Said Mohammad Khan's position remained contingent, although he was temporarily restored to the Hashtnagar revenue-farm between 1845 and 1849. After the British annexation of the Punjab in 1849, Dost Mohammad Khan removed his brothers and their households from the Punjab and escorted them back to Kabul.

== Family and marriages ==
In accordance with the customs of Afghan nobility and Islamic law, Said Mohammad Khan had multiple wives from various tribal backgrounds. Genealogical sources, while not always consistent in their details, indicate he married at least nine times, with wives from the following backgrounds:

- Barakzai ladies (2)
- Popalzai ladies (3)
- Yusufzai ladies (2)
- Nurzai lady (1)
- Qizilbash lady (1)

These marriages represented important political alliances with various Pashtun tribes and ethnic groups. According to some genealogical sources, he had twenty-two sons from these marriages.

== Religious patronage ==
Like other members of the Afghan nobility, Said Mohammad Khan maintained connections with important religious sites. Charles Masson records that the Sardar "of Hashtnagar" was among the noble families who chose to send their deceased family members for burial at the prestigious ziarat (shrine) of Metar Lam Sahib, who is reputed to be the father of the prophet Noah, according to local legend. Mihtarlam, located near the Alishang River, is the name of a town and district in Laghman Province, and the shrine is believed to be at the site of his presumed grave.

This practice of patronizing important religious sites served multiple purposes for the Afghan elite: it demonstrated piety and religious devotion, reinforced social status and prestige, created networks with religious authorities, and established the family's presence at spiritually significant locations. The choice of burial site was particularly important as it connected the family to the baraka (spiritual blessing) associated with holy places.

== Death and legacy ==
Said Mohammad Khan died in 1860 or 1861. He was buried at the shrine of Hazrat Ji in Kandahar, located in the historical Ahmad Shah City near the Shah Burj and the Bardarani Gate. Several of his Kandahar-based half-brothers, including Kuhandil Khan, Mihrdil Khan, Purdil Khan and Sherdil Khan, were also buried there.

His career illustrates the fragmented nature of Barakzai power in the decades before the consolidation of the Afghan state under Dost Mohammad Khan. Although he was not the dominant figure among the Peshawar Sardars, his position in Hashtnagar formed part of the broader territorial settlement by which the sons of Payinda Khan divided power across Kabul, Kandahar, Peshawar and other regions.

His descendants continued to appear in later Afghan genealogical records and administrative families. Genealogical sources trace later descendants through his son Sardar Muhammad Husain Khan and grandson Sardar Muhammad Asif Khan.

Among his later descendants were the brothers Mohammad Hanif Khan and Mohammed Arif Khan, both great-grandsons of Said Mohammad Khan through Sardar Muhammad Husain Khan and Sardar Muhammad Asif Khan. Mohammad Hanif Khan served as governor of Ghorat and later as the first governor of Samangan Province, while General Sardar Mohammed Arif Khan served as Minister of Defense under King Mohammed Zahir Shah and later as Afghan ambassador to the Soviet Union.

== See also ==
- Barakzai dynasty
- Dost Mohammad Khan
- Mohammad Hanif Khan
- Mohammed Arif Khan
- History of Afghanistan
- Peshawar
- Durrani Empire
- Sikh Empire

== Bibliography ==
- Adamec, Ludwig W. (1975). Historical and Political Who's Who of Afghanistan. Graz: Akademische Druck- u. Verlagsanstalt.
- Gazetteer of the Peshawar District 1897–98. Lahore: Punjab Government Press. 1899. (Reprinted: Lahore: Sang-e-Meel Publications, 1989)
- Hanifi, Shah Mahmoud (2011). Connecting Histories in Afghanistan: Market Relations and State Formation on a Colonial Frontier. Stanford: Stanford University Press.
- Hopkins, Benjamin D. (2008). The Making of Modern Afghanistan. Basingstoke: Palgrave Macmillan.
- Kohzad, Ahmad Ali (1966). Men and Events: Through 18th and 19th Century Afghanistan. Kabul.
- Lee, Jonathan L. (2019). Afghanistan: A History from 1260 to the Present. London: Reaktion Books.
- Masson, Charles (1842–1844). Narrative of Various Journeys in Balochistan, Afghanistan and the Panjab. Vol. 1–4. London: Richard Bentley.
- Noelle-Karimi, Christine (1997). State and Tribe in Nineteenth-Century Afghanistan: The Reign of Amir Dost Muhammad Khan (1826–1863). Richmond: Curzon Press.
