= List of current Afghan provincial police chiefs =

This is a table chart of the current police chiefs of Afghanistan. Like provincial governors and deputy governors, police chiefs are all appointed by the Emir of Afghanistan.

== Police chiefs ==
| Province | Police chief | Reference |
|---|---|---|
| Badakhshan | | |
| Badghis | Maulvi Abdul Sattar Sabir | |
| Baghlan | Safiullah | |
| Balkh | Matiullah | |
| Bamyan | | |
| Daykundi | Siddiqullah Abid | |
| Farah | Haji Sahib Masoom | |
| Faryab | Nik Mohammad Huzaifa | |
| Ghazni | | |
| Ghor | Labib Sahib | |
| Helmand | | |
| Herat | | |
| Jowzjan | Damla Siraj | |
| Kabul | Wali Jan Hamza | |
| Kandahar | Abdul Ghafar Mohammadi | |
| Kapisa | | |
| Khost | Mehboob Shah Qanat | |
| Kunar | Abdul Haq Haqqani | |
| Kunduz | Azizullah | |
| Laghman | | |
| Logar | Mohammaduddin Shah Mukhtab | |
| Nangarhar | Neda Mohammad | |
| Nimruz | Sardar Mohammad Ayoubi | |
| Nuristan | | |
| Parwan | | |
| Paktia | | |
| Paktika | | |
| Panjshir | | |
| Samangan | | |
| Sar-e Pol | | |
| Takhar | Habibullah Shakir | |
| Uruzgan | Mullah Abdullah Bashir | |
| Wardak | Sheikh Mohammad Sharif Halimi | |
| Zabul | Mohibullah Ayub Akhundzada | |

== See also ==
- List of current provincial governors in Afghanistan
- List of current provincial deputy governors in Afghanistan
- List of current provincial judges in Afghanistan
