= Mohammed Arif Khan =

20th century Barakzai Minister of Defense

General Sardar Mohammad Arif Khan
- محمد عارف خان

Minister of Defense
- In office 20 September 1953 – 6 December 1955
- Monarch: Mohammed Zahir Shah
- Prime Minister: Mohammed Daoud Khan
- Preceded by: Muhammad Umar
- Succeeded by: Office assumed by Prime Minister Mohammed Daoud Khan

Personal details
- Born: 1907 Kabul, Afghanistan
- Died: 1984 (aged 76–77) Bonn, West Germany
- Spouse: Amina Begum
- Children: Mohammed Wali Khan Arif; Mohammed Tariq Khan Arif; Princess Fatima Arif Zaher
- Relatives: Mohammed Hanif Khan (brother)

Military service
- Allegiance: Kingdom of Afghanistan
- Branch/service: Afghan National Army
- Rank: General
- Commands: Kabul Army Corps, 2nd Division Kabul

Mohammad Arif Khan (Kabul, Afghanistan, ca. 1907– Bonn, West-Germany, c. 1983) was an Afghan military general, diplomat, and Minister of Defense under King Mohammed Zahir Shah. A member of the prominent Mohammedzai branch of the Barakzai dynasty, he held key positions in Afghanistan's military and diplomatic affairs during crucial decades of the 20th century. Following the republican coup in 1973, Arif Khan lived in exile in Bonn, West Germany, until his death.

== Early life and family background ==
In 1941, Arif Khan married Amina Begum, niece of Prime Minister Shah Mahmud Khan of the Musahiban royal family. Their union linked two prominent branches of the Barakzai dynasty. They had two sons, Mohammed Wali Khan Arif and Mohammed Tariq Khan Arif, and a daughter, Princess Fatima Arif Zaher, who married Prince Mohammed Daoud Pashtunyar Khan, son of King Zahir Shah.

== Education ==
Arif Khan studied at the German Amani Lyceum in Kabul and subsequently attended the Military Staff College in Ankara, Turkey, completing his advanced military training in 1938. The same year, he was dispatched to Germany to procure military equipment for the Afghan army.

== Military career ==
Upon his return to Afghanistan in 1939, Arif Khan was appointed Director of Military Training at the Afghan Ministry of War. In 1940, he became Chief-of-Staff to Prince Mohammed Daoud Khan, then Commander of the Kabul Army Corps. Arif Khan rapidly advanced through military ranks, serving as a brigade commander in 1944, and was part of an Afghan military delegation to British India in December that year.

Promoted to Major General in 1946, he took command of the Kabul-based 2nd Division. He successfully suppressed the Safi tribal rebellion in the Kunar Valley in 1947. By 1948, Arif Khan was appointed General Officer Commanding of the Kabul Army Corps, achieving the rank of Lieutenant-General in 1949.

== Minister of defense (1953–1955) ==
When Prince Mohammed Daoud Khan assumed the role of Prime Minister in 1953, Arif Khan became Minister of Defense, succeeding General Mohammed Umar. He stepped down on 6 December 1955.

== See also ==
- Mohammed Zahir Shah
- Mohammed Daoud Khan
- Mohammed Hanif Khan
- Said Mohammed Khan
- Barakzai dynasty
