= Sayed Ahmad Haqbeen =

Afghan politician (born 1953)

Minister of Border & Tribal Affairs Acting
- In office 31 December 2014 – 21 April 2015
- Preceded by: Mohammad Akram Khpalwak
- Succeeded by: Mohammad Gulab Mangal

Minister of Border & Tribal Affairs Deputy
- In office 2004–2017
- President: Ashraf Ghani
- Preceded by: Mohammad Omer Babrakzai

Governor of Kapisa Province
- In office 1997–2004
- Preceded by: Mawlawi Ghulam Eyshan
- Succeeded by: Abdul Sattar Murad

Personal details
- Born: 1953 (age 72–73) Kohistan District, Kapisa Province, Afghanistan
- Party: Jamiat-e Islami
- Website: Mob Official website

Sayed Ahmad Haqbeen (Pashto: سید احمد حقبین, Persian: سید احمد حقبین, born 1953) is the former deputy and acting minister of Ministry of Borders and Tribal Affairs of Afghanistan, and a former governor of Kapisa Province. He was elected as the Acting minister of Ministry of Border & Tribal Affairs on 31 December 2014. He previously served as the deputy minister of Ministry of Border Affairs and as the Governor of Kapisa Province.

== Political career ==
Haqbeen served as a negotiator for the Afghan Northern Alliance delegation to the Bonn conference on Afghanistan in Bonn, Germany. According to the list of participants announced by the United Nations on 27 November 2001, Mr. Haqbeen was one of the 26 participants representing United National Front. According to Radio Free Europe/Radio Liberty poppy cultivation was on rise in Kapisa Province during his governorship.

== Wikileaks cables ==
In the WikiLeaks cables released in 2005, Haqbeen was cited as one of the officials in Afghanistan.
