= Mohammad Hanif Khan =

20th-century Afghan governor

Sardar Mohammad Hanif Khan محمد حنیف خان
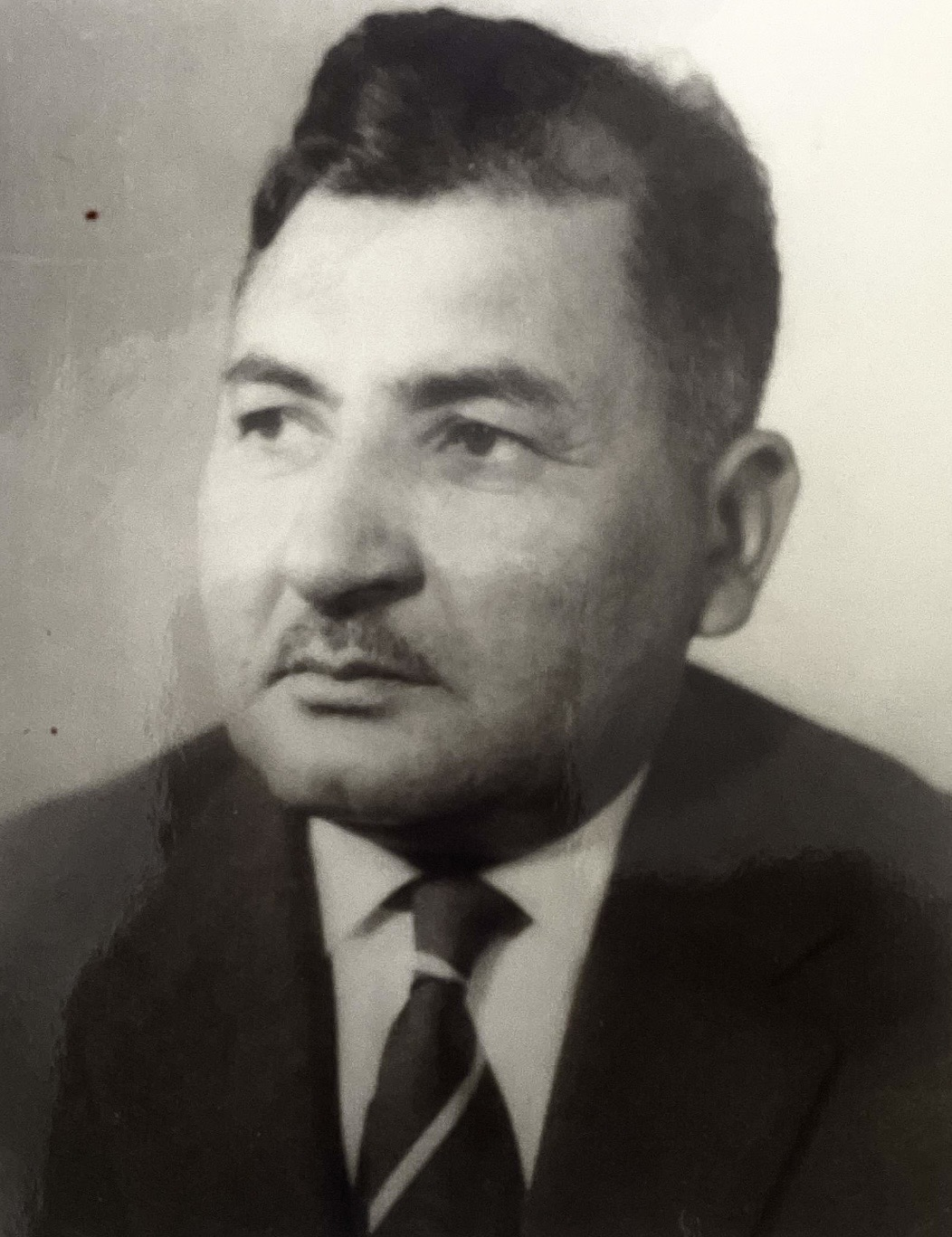

Governor of Samangan Province
- In office 1964–1967
- Preceded by: position established

Governor of Ghorat (Herat Province)
- In office 1954–1964

Personal details
- Born: June 20, 1911 Kabul, Emirate of Afghanistan
- Died: October 2, 1994 Alexandria, Virginia, United States
- Spouse: Saida (Shirin Jan) Salek
- Relations: Barakzai dynasty
- Parent(s): Sardar Asif Khan (father), Jahan Begum (mother)
- Profession: Provincial governor

Sardar Mohammad Hanif Khan (Kabul, Afghanistan, 20 June 1911 – Alexandria, Virginia, United States, 2 October 1994) was an Afghan aristocrat and provincial governor during the reign of King Mohammad Zahir Shah. A member of the Muhammadzai branch of the Barakzai dynasty, he served as the governor (ālī ḥākim) of Ghorat in the 1950s. At that time, Ghorat was not a separate province but formed part of the administrative territory of Herat Province. The modern Ghor Province was re-established in 1964, incorporating Ghorat and surrounding regions. Hanif Khan subsequently became the first governor of the newly established Samangan Province in 1964. Hanif Khan was part of the Barakzai royal lineage descended from Sardar Payinda Khan Mohammedzai, making him a relative of Afghan rulers of the 19th and 20th centuries, including Amir Dost Mohammad Khan, Sardar Sultan Mohammad Khan Telai and Zahir Shah. He is remembered for his role in provincial administration and contributions to local (especially agricultural) development.

== Early life and family background ==
Mohammad Hanif Khan was born on 20 June 1911 into the Muhammadzai nobility of Afghanistan. His father was Sardar Asif Khan, a provincial governor, and his mother, Bibi Jan Begum, was the daughter of Jan Mahomed Khan, a senior official in the court of Amir Abdur Rahman Khan. Jan Mahomed Khan served as Lord of the Treasury (chief treasury officer, Khazanadar-e-Kul (خزانه دار کل) under Amir Abdur Rahman Khan.

Hanif Khan’s paternal lineage traces directly to the Barakzai dynasty’s founding generation. He was a direct descendant of Sardar Payinda Muhammad Khan (also known as Sarfraz Khan), the chief of the Barakzai tribe who was killed in 1799. Hanif Khan’s great-grandfather was Sardar Said Mohammad Khan (1797–1860), one of the so-called "Peshawar Sardars," a group of brothers who controlled the northwestern frontier regions of Afghanistan during the early 19th century, particularly the areas of Peshawar, Hashtnagar and associated crown lands (khalisajat).

Hanif Khan’s brother, General Mohammed Arif Khan served as Minister of Defence in the first cabinet of Prime Minister Daoud Khan under King Zahir Shah, and later as Afghan ambassador to the Soviet Union.

== Political career ==
Mohammad Hanif Khan entered government service during the mid-20th century, when King Zahir Shah’s regime often appointed royal relatives to provincial posts. In addition to his known gubernatorial roles, Mohammad Hanif Khan held various administrative positions across northern and western Afghanistan during the 1940s and 1950s. By 1954, Hanif Khan was appointed Ālī Ḥākim (Governor) of Ghor (Ghorat) in central Afghanistan. Local Afghan accounts recall that during his governorship he took a special interest in development projects, such as establishing an agricultural research farm near Chaghcharan (the provincial capital) to improve farming productivity. A local tradition also credits Hanif Khan with naming the nearby Kārgōsh Canyon (Gul Dara, or “Valley of Flowers”) during his tenure.

In 1964, Afghanistan underwent administrative reforms that created new provinces, including Samangan Province in the north. Mohammad Hanif Khan was appointed as the first Governor of Samangan. He served from 1964 into the late 1960s, overseeing the initial organization of the provincial government. Under his administration, the capital Aybak was developed and integrated into the national governance structure for the first time as a separate province. Hanif Khan’s role as governor of two different provinces illustrates the trust placed in members of the Muhammadzai nobility to manage key regional responsibilities in the kingdom. His tenure in both provinces coincided with the last decade of King Zahir Shah’s rule—a period often described as Afghanistan’s “Golden Age” of stability and modernization.

Hanif Khan retired from public office by the early 1970s, following the abolition of the monarchy in the 1973 coup by Mohammed Daoud Khan. Like many members of the old aristocracy, he withdrew from public life during the Republic and Communist eras.

== Personal life and later years ==
Mohammad Hanif Khan married Saida (Shirin Jan) Bibi Salek in 1938 in Kabul. Saida Bibi was the daughter of Yar Mohammad Khan, a financial official (mustawfi) who served during the reign of King Amanullah Khan (1919–1929). Her father is from an Achakzai Durrani family. Together they had five sons and two daughters. He resided with his family in the historic Shahrara neighborhood of Kabul. Shahrara is one of the oldest districts of the city, dating back approximately 500 years.

After the communist coup d’état (Saur Revolution), Mohammad Hanif Khan and his family lived in exile in United States. He died in 1994 at the age of 83 in Alexandria, Virginia.
