= Hizbullah Afghan =

Chief of Staff of the Al-Badr Corps

Maulvi Hizbullah Afghan
- مولوي حزب الله افغان

Governor of Zabul
- In office 26 June 2023 – 26 April 2025
- Preceded by: Qudratullah Abu Hamza
- Succeeded by: Sher Mohammad Sharif

Chief of Staff of the Al-Badr Corps
- In office 4 October 2021 – 4 March 2022
- Succeeded by: Mullah Bari Gul Akhund

Governor of Farah
- In office August 2021 – 6 November 2021
- Prime Minister: Hassan Akhund
- Succeeded by: Noor Mohammad Rohani

Personal details
- Profession: politician, military officer

Military service
- Allegiance: Islamic Emirate of Afghanistan
- Branch/service: Islamic Emirate Army
- Rank: Chief of Staff
- Commands: Chief of Staff of the Al-Badr Corps

Maulvi Hizbullah Afghan (Pashto: مولوي حزب الله افغان) is an Afghan Taliban militant leader who has been Chief of Staff of the Al-Badr Corps from 4 October 2021 to 4 March 2022. He was also Governor of Farah from August 2021 to 6 November 2021.

Hizbullah was appointed as Governor of Zabul on 26 June 2023. Before becoming Governor of Zabul, he served as deputy commander of the 217 Omari Corps. He resigned as Governor of Zabul on 26 April 2023, and his position was replaced by Sher Mohammad Sharif.
