= List of governors of Takhar =

This is a list of the governors of the province of Takhar, Afghanistan.

== Governors of Takhar Province ==
Governor	Period	Extra	Note
Mohammed Daud Daud	? ?		
Qazi Kabir Marzban	Mid 1990s		
Sayed Ikramuddin Masoomi	2002 2003		
Qazi Kabir Marzban	2003 2005		
Abdul Kabir Marzban	June 2005; 17 August 2007		
Ghulam Qawis Abubaker	17 August 2007; 13 October 2009		
Abdul Latif Ibrahimi	13 October 2009; 18 March 2010		
Abdul Jabar Taqwa	18 March 2010; 19 September 2012		
Ahmad Faisal Begzad	20 September 2012 8 July 2013		
Abdul Latif Ibrahimi	9 July 2013 7 October 2015		
Yasin Zia	October 2015 May 2017		
Fazlullah Mujadedi	July 2017 April 2019		
Abdul Haq Shafaq	8 April 2019; August 2021		
Maulvi Nooruddin Umair	2021; 14 March 2022		
Qari Mohammad Ismail Turkman	14 March 2022; Present		

== See also ==
- List of current governors of Afghanistan
