= Muhammad Umar (born 1898) =

Afghan politician

- محمد عمر
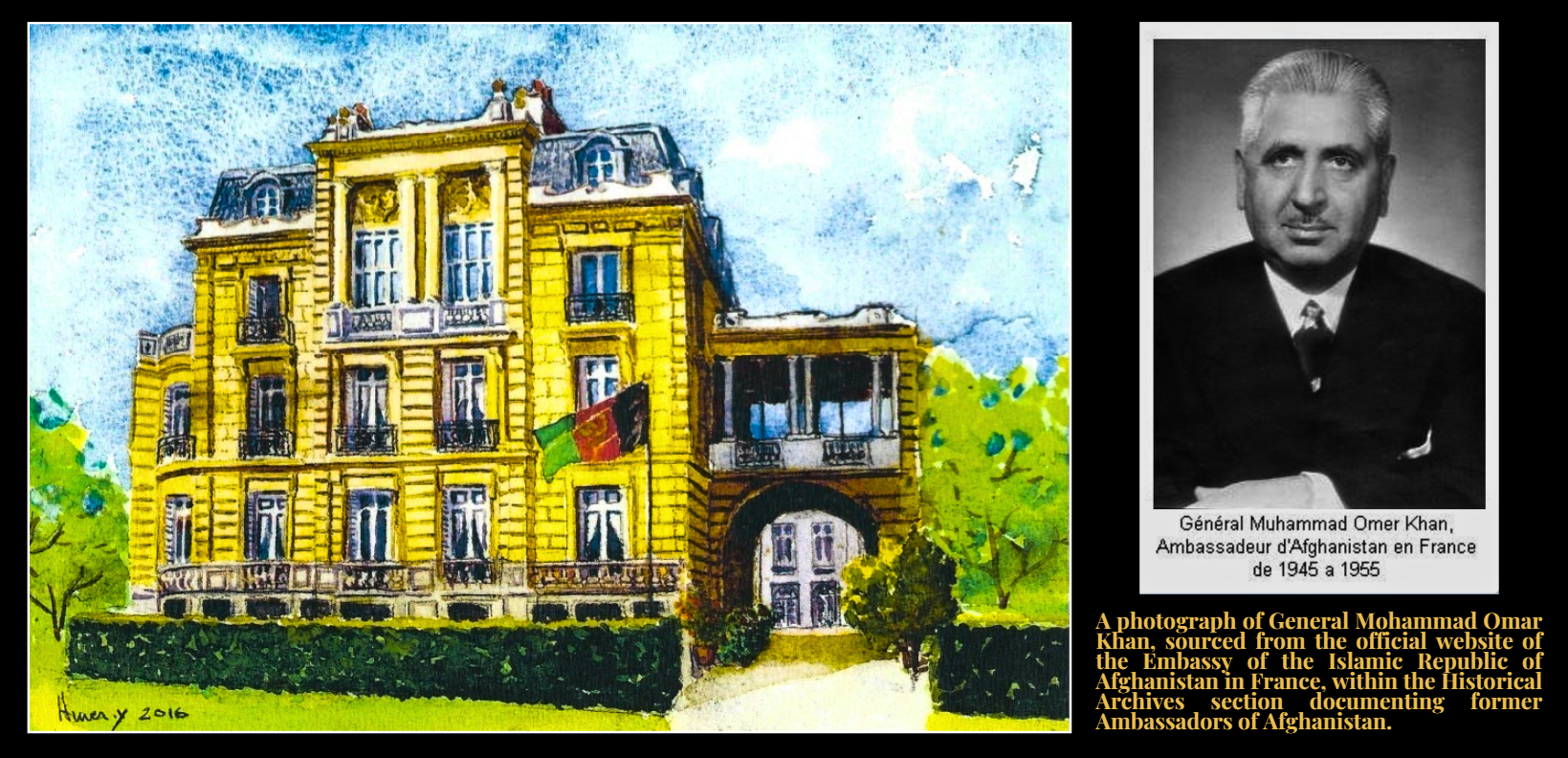

Minister of Defense
- In office 1948–1952
- Monarch: Mohammad Zahir Shah
- Prime Minister: Shah Mahmud Khan
- Preceded by: Mohammad Daoud Khan
- Succeeded by: Muhammad Aref
Diplomatic offices
Ambassador of Afghanistan to India
In office 1958–1964
Ambassador of Afghanistan to Iran
In office 1955–1957
Ambassador of Afghanistan to France
In office 1949–1955
| Succeeded by |

Personal details
- Born: 1898 Baghban Kocha, Kabul, Afghanistan
- Died: March 1964 (aged 65 - 66) Kabul, Kingdom of Afghanistan

Military service
- Allegiance: Royal Afghan Army
- Years of service: ?

Muhammad Umar (Pashto/Dari: محمد عمر; 1898-1964) was an Afghan politician who served as minister of defense from 1948 to 1952. He also served a number of other offices.

== Early life ==
Umar was born in 1898 to the Yusufzai tribe of the Abu Ahmad Khan family.

== Career ==
Umar rose to the rank of Major General (Firqa Mishar) and served as Deputy Chief of Staff in 1924. In December of the same year, he was invited by the Commander-in-Chief in India to observe military maneuvers in Delhi.

In October 1926, he was appointed Head of the Afghan Military Mission to Russia, tasked with selecting artillery for the Afghan army and studying Soviet military techniques. He departed from Kabul by air on 3 November 1926, traveling via Termez to Moscow. In 1928, he visited both Russia and Italy. At one point, he held the position of Military Attaché in Berlin.

Muhammad Umar later became Chief of the Afghan General Staff. In 1932, he traveled to Europe to attend the Disarmament Conference in Geneva and visited Paris in December 1933 before returning to Kabul via India in January 1934. He resumed his role as Chief of Staff but returned to Geneva in May 1934. In June 1935, he represented Afghanistan on the League of Nations Disarmament Committee. Reports suggest he was recalled to Kabul in 1936, where he continued as Chief of Staff and later became Head of the Royal Secretariat.

From 1948 to 1952, he served as Minister of Defense in Shah Mahmud's government. He then took on diplomatic roles, serving as Ambassador to Paris (1949–1955), Tehran (1955–1957), and Delhi (1958–1964).

== Death ==
After a long career in both military and diplomatic service, he retired and died in Kabul in March 1964.
