= Fazlullah Wahidi =

Afghan politician (born 1951)

Sayed Fazlullah Wahidi
- فضل الله وحیدي
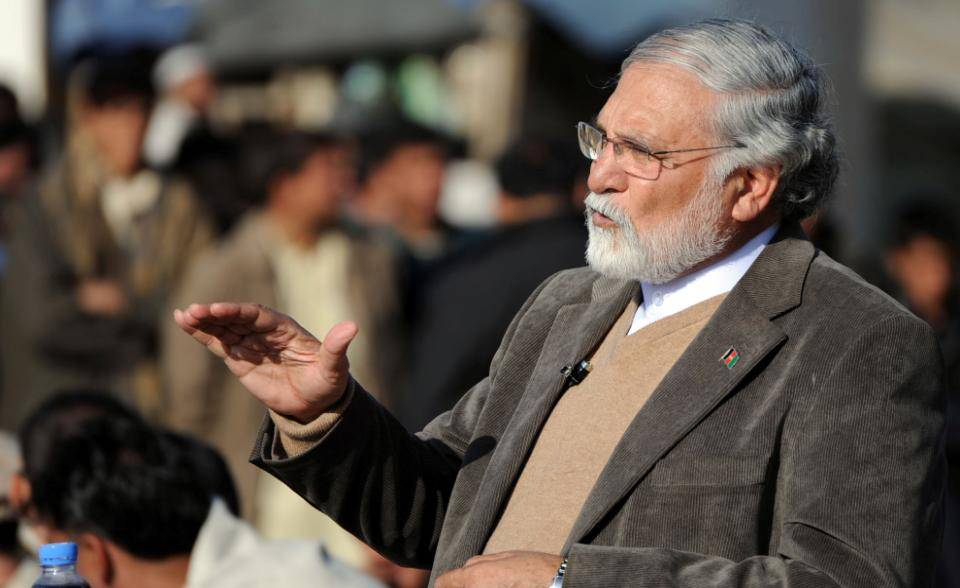
- Wahidi giving a speech at a cricket tournament near a U.S. Forward Operating Base in 2010

Governor of Herat Province, Afghanistan
- In office 4 July 2013 – 24 December 2014
- Preceded by: Daud Shah Saba

Governor of Kunar Province, Afghanistan
- In office 18 November 2007 – 3 July 2013
- Preceded by: Hajji Mohammad Didar
- Succeeded by: Shuja ul-Mulk Jalala

Personal details
- Born: 1951 (age 74–75) Surkh Rod District, Nangarhar Province, Afghanistan

Sayed Fazlullah Wahidi (Pashto: فضل الله وحیدي, born: 1951) is a politician in Afghanistan. He served as the governor of Herat Province, appointed by President Hamid Karzai on 2 July 2013. Previously, he served as Kunar Governor and as the chairman of the Afghan NGOs' Coordination Bureau (ANCB), a non-profit umbrella organization of over 270 local NGOs.

== Education and early life ==
Sayed Fazlullah Wahidi was born in Surkh Rod District of Nangarhar Province in 1951. Fazlullah studied literature at Kabul University in 1973. He claims to be Sayed (Arab), and is fluent in Dari, Pashto, and English.

== Social life ==
Sayed Fazlullah has worked in the humanitarian relief and assistance fields in Afghanistan for over 25 years.

Wahidi served as the chairman of the Afghan NGOs' Coordination Bureau (ANCB), a non-profit umbrella organization of over 270 local NGOs. He served as the General Director and Chairman of ANCB Kabul, Afghanistan, and Peshawar, Pakistan, respectively. He was also the Director of the Afghan-German Help Coordination Office (AGHCO). He continues to represent Afghan NGOs internationally as an elected executive committee member of the International Council of Voluntary Agencies.

== Political life ==
Wahidi has a technocratic background who is not associated with any political party, however during the jihad period, Wahidi was associated with National Islamic Front of Afghanistan, headed by Pir Sayed Ahmad Gillani.

He was appointed as the Governor of Kunar Province on November 18, 2007, and Governor of Herat Province on July 3, 2013.
