= Abdul Ahad Talib =

Governor of Helmand Province

Maulvi Abdul Ahad Talib
- Pashto: مولوی عبدالاحد طالب

Governor of Helmand
- In office 24 August 2021 – 30 October 2023
- Prime Minister: Hasan Akhund
- Emir: Hibatullah Akhundzada
- Preceded by: Mohammad Yasin Khan
- Succeeded by: Abdul Rahman Kunduzi

Maulvi Abdul Ahad Talib (Pashto: مولوی عبدالاحد طالب) is an Afghan Taliban politician and commander who is currently serving as Governor of Helmand Province since 24 August 2021.

On 30 October 2023, Talib was appointed as the commander of Hibatullah Akhundzada's special forces. The position of Helmand Governor was replaced by Abdul Rahman Kunduzi.
