= Nisar Ahmad Nusrat =

Governor of Kunduz

Mullah Nisar Ahmad Nusrat
- Pashto: ملا نثار احمد نصرت

Governor of Kunduz
- In office 7 November 2021 – 3 March 2024
- Prime Minister: Hasan Akhund
- Emir: Hibatullah Akhundzada
- Preceded by: Asadullah Omarkhel

Governor of Baghlan
- In office August 2021 – 6 November 2021
- Succeeded by: Bakhtiar Muaz

Mullah Nisar Ahmad Nusrat (Pashto: ملا نثار احمد نصرت) was an Afghan Taliban politician who served as Governor of Kunduz Province from 7 November 2021 to 3 March 2024. He also served as Governor of Baghlan from August 2021 to 6 November 2021.

On 6 March 2024, Nusrat was killed in a drone strike on Puli Alam, Logar Province.
