= Gul Mohammad Arefi =

Afghan politician

Gul Mohammed Arefi (Pashto: گل محمد عارفي) was Governor of Badghis Province in Afghanistan from 2001 to 2005.

| Preceded by None | Governor of Badghis Province, Afghanistan; 2001–2005 | Succeeded by Enayatullah Enayat |
