= Mohammadullah Idris =

Governor of Kapisa province

Maulvi Mohammadullah Idris
- Pashto: مولوي محمدالله ادریس

Governor of Kapisa
- Incumbent
- Assumed office September 2021
- Prime Minister: Hasan Akhund
- Emir: Hibatullah Akhundzada

Maulvi Mohammadullah Idris (Pashto: مولوي محمدالله ادریس) is an Afghan Taliban politician who became Governor of Kapisa province in September 2021.
