= Shuja ul-Mulk Jalala =

Governor of Kunar Province, Afghanistan
- In office 15 July 2013 – 18 May 2015
- Preceded by: Fazlullah Wahidi
- Succeeded by: Wahidullah Kalimzai

Personal details
- Born: 1952 (age 73–74) Ghaziabad, Kunar Province, Afghanistan
- Profession: Politician

Shuja ul-Mulk Jalala (born 1952), also known as Ghulam Rasul, is a politician in Afghanistan. He was the governor of Kunar Province, appointed by President Hamid Karzai on July 15, 2013, after a suggestion by the Independent Directorate of Local Governance (IDLG).

== Early life and education ==
The third son of ‘Abdu’l Malik Khan of Jalala, Shujah ul-Mulk Jalala was born in Ghaziabad District of Kunar Province in 1952. He is a great grandson of Aman ul-Mulk, the Mehtar of Chitral from 1857 until 1892. He remained in this district through the completion of his primary education, and he received his high school education in the provincial capital, Asadabad.

== Career ==
During the Soviet–Afghan War, Jalala joined the Mujahideen and served as a commander. He also developed political ties with the National Islamic Front of Afghanistan led by Hazrat Sibghatullah Mujadidi, and was a member of the 2002 Emergency Loya Jirga after the United States overthrew the Taliban regime. Following a February 2013 NATO airstrike in Shigal district in eastern Kunar that resulted in civilian casualties, Jalala was sent by President Karzai to lead a delegation for the purpose of investigating the incident and delivering condolences from the president to the grieving families.

In the 2005 Wolesi Jirga Election, Jalala received the third most votes from Kunar Province; thus from 2005 to 2011, Jalala served as a Member of the National Assembly (MNA) for Afghanistan. He then operated as Presidential Advisor for Tribal Affairs from 2011 to 2013.

=== Governor of Kunar Province ===
He was appointed the Governor of Kunar Province on July 15, 2013.

As governor, Jalala expressed a desire to improve a variety of social conditions in Kunar. His priorities were peace and reconciliation, anti-corruption, and counter-narcotics, but other objectives included increasing the availability of safe drinking water in Asadabad, reducing timber smuggling, and maintaining a commitment to girls' education. With international military support on the decline in Kunar, Jalala acknowledged that tackling these social issues would not be easy, saying:

I started my work at the time when some in the aid community stopped their financial support to the province. Now, I receive only operational fund[s] which are very limited, but I intend to work tirelessly with these limited resources. [...] We are facing a lot of challenges in the province.

Jalala is also the president of the Jalala Foundation, a public welfare organization.

== Family background ==
Shuja ul-Mulk Jalala belongs to the famous Katoor Dynasty which has ruled an independent Kingdom of Chitral since 1560 and is the great-grandson of King Aman ul-Mulk II, a Mehtar of Chitral who ruled from 1858 to 1892. The ninth son of Aman ul-Mulk II, 'Abdu’l Rahman Khan of Jalala, emigrated from Chitral, in what is now Pakistan, to Afghanistan in 1892 after the murder of some of his brothers. With support from the rulers of Kabul, he settled at Jalala in Kunar, within the Kunar Valley.

Preceded by Fazlullah Wahidi	Governor of Kunar Province, Afghanistan; 15 July 2013-	Succeeded by None
