= Sayed Anwar Sadat =

Politician in Afghanistan

Sayed Anwar Sadat سید انور سادات

Governor of Faryab Province
- In office 2015–2017
- Preceded by: Muhammadullah Batash
- Succeeded by: Muhammad Humayun Fuzi

Personal details
- Born: Sayed Anwar; 1971 (age 54–55) Sar-e Pol Province, Afghanistan
- Occupation: Politician
- Ethnicity: Uzbek

Sayed Anwar Sadat (Dari: سید انور سادات) is an ethnic Uzbek politician in Afghanistan. He served as governor of Faryab Province from 2015 to 2017.

== Early life ==
Sayed Anwar Sadat was born in 1971 in the province of Sar-e Pol, Afghanistan. Sadat graduated from school in Sar-e Pol Province. He received his undergraduate degree in journalism from Istanbul University in Turkey in 2001.
