= Bakhtiar Muaz =

Governor of Baghlan Province

Qari Bakhtiar Muaz
- قاري بختیار معاذ

Governor of Baghlan
- Incumbent
- Assumed office 7 November 2021
- Prime Minister: Hasan Akhund
- Emir: Hibatullah Akhundzada
- Preceded by: Maulvi Nisar Ahmad

Qari Bakhtiar Muaz (Pashto: قاري بختیار معاذ) is an Afghan Taliban politician who is currently serving as governor of Baghlan Province since 7 November 2021.
