= Delbar Jan Arman =

Afghani politician

Delbar Jan Arman Shinwari دلبر جان آرمان شینواری
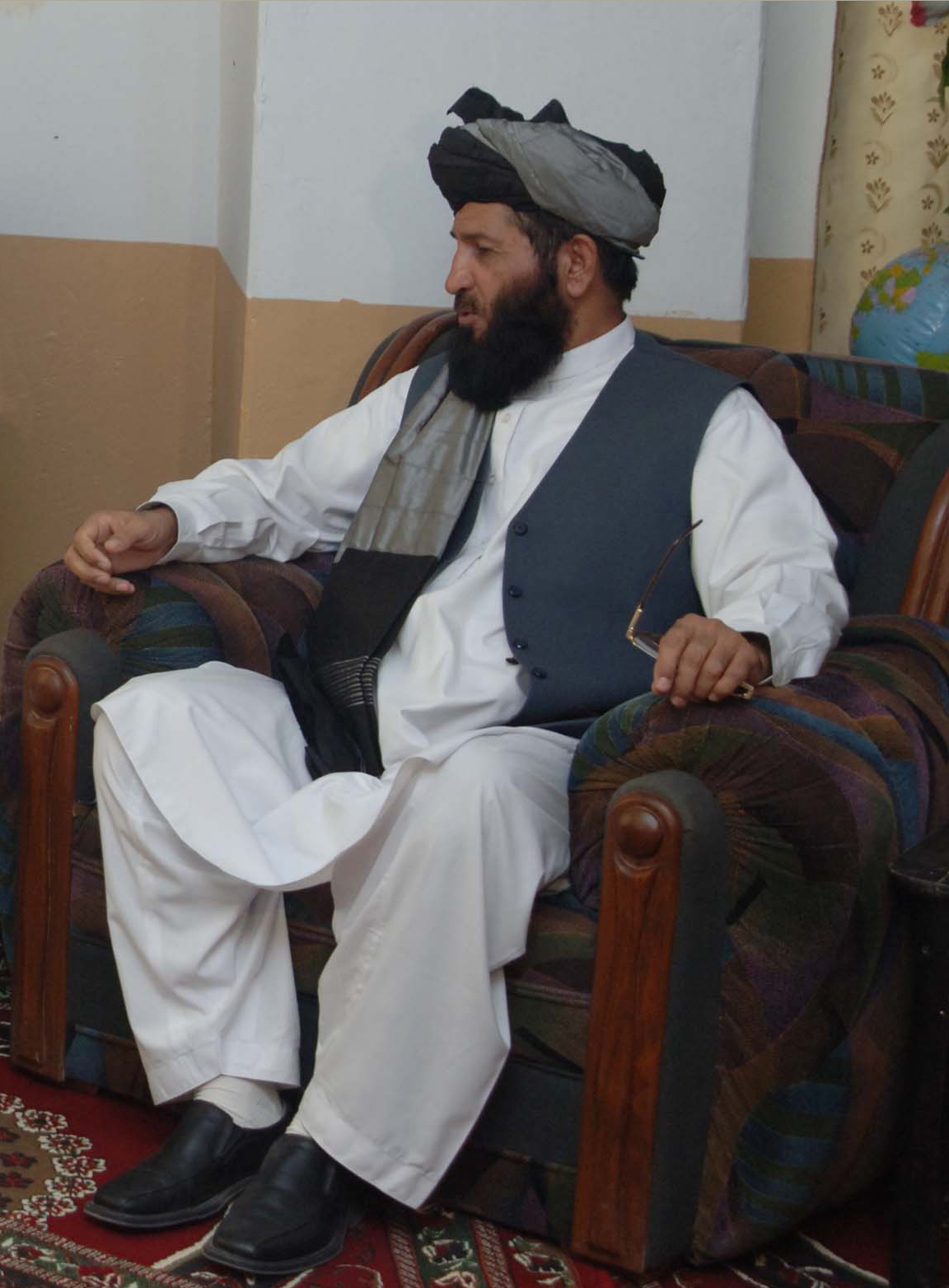

Governor of Badghis
- In office 30 March 2009 – 19 September 2012
- Preceded by: Mohammad Ashraf Naseri
- Succeeded by: Mohammad Tahir Sabari

Governor of Zabul, Afghanistan.
- In office 6 March 2005 – 30 March 2009
- Preceded by: Khial Mohammad
- Succeeded by: Mohammad Ashraf Naseri

Personal details
- Born: Jaji Maidan District, Khost province, Afghanistan
- Occupation: Politician, former Mujahideen leader

Delbar Jan Arman, also Dilbar Jan Arman Shinwari (Pashto: دلبر جان ارمان شینواری) is a politician from Afghanistan. He is the ex-governor of Badghis Province.

== Early life ==
Delbar Jan Arman was born in Jaji Maidan district of Khost Province, Afghanistan. has a military and academic background. In the 1970s, he studied for six years at the American Technical College in Kabul. He was also trained in the Afghan Army. From 2005 till 2009 he was the governor of Zabul Province, Afghanistan. He was an anti-Soviet insurgent who fled to Pakistan during the Taliban's rule of Afghanistan. He was appointed governor of Zabul on 3 March 2005 by President Hamid Karzai. Delbar Jan Arman is known for his intimate involvement with the U.S. Provincial Reconstruction Team based in Qalat and their combined efforts to quickly deploy development projects across the province. In May 2009 he switched positions with Mohammad Ashraf Naseri. Delbar Jan Arman became governor of Badghis Province, Mohammad Ashraf Naseri took over the Government of Zabul Province.

Preceded by Mohammad Ashraf Naseri	Governor of Badghis, Afghanistan; 2009–Present	Succeeded by Incumbent
Preceded by Khial Mohammad	Governor of Zabul Province, Afghanistan; 2005–2009	Succeeded by Mohammad Ashraf Naseri
