= Ahmad Faisal Begzad =

Governor of Badakhshan, Afghanistan

Governor Ahmad Faisal Begzad

Governor of Badakhshan
- Incumbent
- Assumed office 26 October 2015
- Preceded by: Shah Waliullah Adeeb

Governor of Takhar
- In office 20 September 2012 – 8 July 2013
- Preceded by: Abdul Jabbar Taqwa
- Succeeded by: Abdul Latif Ibrahimi

General Ahmad Faisal Begzad, also called Ahmad Beig, is a former governor of Takhar Province. He assumed the role on 20 September 2012 and was previously the acting governor of Faryab Province. He left office in 2013 and became governor of Badakhshan in 2015.
