= Abdul Rahman Kunduzi =

Governor of Samangan province

Mawlawi Abdul Rahman Kunduzi
- مولوي عبدالرحمن کندوزي

Governor of Helmand
- Incumbent
- Assumed office 30 October 2023
- Prime Minister: Hasan Akhund
- Emir: Hibatullah Akhundzada
- Preceded by: Abdul Ahad Talib

Governor of Samangan
- In office 2021 – 30 October 2023
- Prime Minister: Hasan Akhund
- Emir: Hibatullah Akhundzada

Mawlawi Abdul Rahman Muslim (Pashto: مولوي عبدالرحمن مسلم), also known as Abdul Rahman Kunduzi (Pashto: مولوي عبدالرحمن کندوزي) is an Afghan Taliban politician who is currently serving as Governor of Samangan Province. He was also interviewed by Ghaith Abdul-Ahad that year. He was imprisoned in October 2012, but later released and led the takeover of Samangan in summer 2021.

Kunduzi was appointed as Governor of Helmand on 30 October 2023, replacing Abdul Ahad Talib.
