= Aamir Latif =

Afghan politician

Mohammad Aamir Latif is the former governor of Faryab Province, Afghanistan.

Preceded by Abdul Latif Ibrahimi	Governor of Faryab Province, Afghanistan; 2005–2007	Succeeded by Abdul Haq Shafaq
