= List of governors of Uruzgan =

This is a list of the governors of the province of Uruzgan, Afghanistan.

== Governors of Uruzgan Province ==
Governor	Period	Extra	Note
Jan Mohammed Khan	2002; June 2006		
Maulavi Abdul Hakim Munib	June 2006; September 2007		
Assadullah Hamdam	September 2007; 3 April 2012		
Amir Muhammad Akhundzada	3 April 2012 – 10 March 2014		
Mohammad Nazir Kharoti	? ?		
Haji Dawat	7 November 2021 ?		
Inayatullah Shuja	? Present		

== See also ==
- List of current governors of Afghanistan
