= List of governors of Kapisa =

This is a list of the governors of the province of Kapisa, Afghanistan.

== Governors of Kapisa Province ==
Governor	Period	Extra	Note
Sayed Ahmad Haqbin	- -		
Abdul Sattar Murad	2005; 17 July 2007		
Mohammad Nabi Safi	(April 2011 – 2015)		
Mohammadullah Idris	2021; Present		

== See also ==
- List of current governors of Afghanistan
