= Muhammad Qasim Khalid =

Afghan Taliban politician

Maulvi Muhammad Qasim Khalid
- Pashto: مولوي محمد قاسم خالد

Governor of Kunar
- Incumbent
- Assumed office 21 September 2021
- Prime Minister: Hasan Akhund
- Emir: Hibatullah Akhundzada
- Preceded by: Mohammad Usman Turabi

Maulvi Muhammad Qasim Khalid (Pashto: مولوي محمد قاسم خالد) is an Afghan Taliban politician who is currently serving as Governor of Kunar province since 21 September 2021.
