= Mohammad Saleh Zari =

Mohammad Saleh Zari was Governor of Faryab Province in Afghanistan from the fall of the Taliban in 2001 until 2003. He was reportedly associated with warlord Abdul Rashid Dostum.

Preceded by None	Governor of Faryab Province, Afghanistan; 2001–2003	Succeeded by Enayatullah Enayat
