= List of governors of Badghis =

This is a list of the governors of the province of Badghis, Afghanistan.

== Governors of Badghis Province ==
No.	Portrait	Name	Terms of office		Political Party	Extra	Note
No.	Portrait	Name	Start office	Left office	Political Party	Extra	Note
1		Azizullah Afzali	?	?	?		
2		Gul Mohammad Arefi	2001	2005	?		
3		Enayatullah Enayat	2005	May 2007	Hezb-e Islami Gulbuddin		
4		Mohammad Nasim Tokhi	23 May 2007	March 2009	?		
5		Mohammad Ashraf Naseri	November 2007	November 2007	Independent		
5		Dilbar Jan Arman Shinwari	30 March 2009	19 September 2012	?		
6		Jamaluddin Ishaq	September 2015	September 2015	?		
7		Husamuddin Shams	-2021	2021	?		
8		Maulvi Abdul Sattar	2021	Present	Taliban		

== See also ==
- List of current governors of Afghanistan
