= List of governors of Helmand =

This is a list of the governors of the province of Helmand, Afghanistan.

== Governors of Helmand Province ==
| Governor | Period | Extra | Note |
|---|---|---|---|
| Mohammad Hashim Safi | 1967-1969 | | |
| Majid Serbilard | ?-1978 | | |
| Fazal Jan Jahesh | ?-1979 | | |
| Mama Rasoul | ?-1980 | | |
| Khan Jan | 1981-1983 | | |
| Zeyarmal | 1984 | | |
| Gul Mahmad Khwashal | 1984 or 1985-? | | |
| Shah Nazar Helmandwal | 1987-1991 | | |
| Gul Mahmad Khwashal | 1991-1992? | | |
| Hafizullah | 1992 | | |
| Akhwaendi | 1992-1993 | | |
| Rasoul Akhundzada | 1993-1994 | | |
| Ghaffour Akhundzada | 1993-1994 | | |
| Mullah Mahmad Karim | 1994-1995? | | |
| Mullah Abdul Bari | 1995-2001 | | |
| Sher Mohammad Akhundzada | 2001–2005 | | |
| Mohammad Daoud | December 2005–December 10, 2006 | | |
| Assadullah Wafa | 2006–2008 | | |
| Mohammad Gulab Mangal | March 22, 2008 – September 20, 2012 | | |
| Naeem Baloch | September 20, 2012–Unknown | | |
| Mirza Khan Rahimi | September 2015–March 31, 2016 | | |
| Hayatullah Hayat | April 1, 2016 – May 14, 2018 | | |
| Mohammad Yasin Khan | June 3, 2018–August 24, 2021 | | |
| Maulvi Abdul Ahad Talib | August 24, 2021–October 30, 2023 | | |
| Abdul Rahman Kunduzi | October 30, 2023 - October 28, 2025 | | |
| Amanuddin Mansur | October 28, 2025 - present | | |

== See also ==
- List of Afghanistan governors
