= List of governors of Zabul =

This is a list of the governors of the province of Zabul, Afghanistan.

== Governors of Zabul Province ==
Governor	Period	Extra	Note
Khial Mohammad	? ?		
Delbar Jan Arman	2005; March 2009		
Mohammad Ashraf Naseri	March 2009 ??		
Bismillah Afghanmal	14 March 2016 ??		
Rahmatullah Yarmal	?? ?		
Maulvi Ibrahim	Sep 2021; 6 November 2021	under the Islamic Emirates of Afghanistan	
Bismillah Abdullah	7 November 2021; 6 October 2022	under the Islamic Emirates of Afghanistan	
Qudratullah Abu Hamza	6 October 2022; 26 June 2023	under the Islamic Emirates of Afghanistan	
Hizbullah Afghan	26 June 2023; 26 April 2025	under the Islamic Emirates of Afghanistan	
Sher Mohammad Sharif	26 April 2025 present	under the Islamic Emirates of Afghanistan	

== See also ==
- List of current governors of Afghanistan
