= List of governors of Balkh =

Governor of Balkh
- Incumbent; Muhammad Yousuf Wafa; Acting since March 9, 2023
- Seat: Mazar-i-Sharif
- Appointer: Appointed by the Supreme Leader
- Deputy: Deputy Governor of Balkh

This is a list of the governors of the province of Balkh, Afghanistan.

== Governors of Balkh Province ==
- Acting

Portrait	Name (Birth–Death)	Term of office		Political party
Portrait	Name (Birth–Death)	Took office	Left office	Political party
	Sardar Abdul Wahab Khan (1848 - 13 July 1920)	1911	1919	
	Abdul Wahab Malikyar	1975	Unknown	
	Norullah Noori (born 1967)	October 2000	December 2001	Taliban
	Mohammad Ishaq Rahguza	2001	December 2003	
	Habibullah Habib	December 2003		
	Atta Muhammad Nur (born 1976)	2004	January 25, 2018	Jamiat-e-Islami
	Mohammad Ishaq Rahguza	January 25, 2018	October 6, 2020	
	Mohammad Farhad Azimi (born 1976)	October 6, 2020	August 15, 2021 (deposed.)	
	Maulvi Qudratullah Abu Hamza	August 15, 2021	Late 2022	Taliban
	Daud Muzamil	Late 2022	March 9, 2023 (assassinated.)	Taliban
	Muhammad Yousuf Wafa	March 9, 2023	Incumbent	Taliban

== See also ==
- List of current governors of Afghanistan
