= List of governors of Kunar =

This is a list of the governors of the province of Kunar, Afghanistan.

== Governors of Kunar Province ==
Governor	Period	Extra	Note
Said Fazal Akbar	2001; Dec, 2005		
Assadullah Wafa	2005; 2006		
????	???? 18 November		
Fazlullah Wahidi	18 November 2007; July 2013		
Shuja ul-Mulk Jalala	15 July 2013 ????		
Wahidullah Kalimzai	25-05-2015 -?		
Haqmal Mamond	?-?		
Mohammad Usman Turabi	August 2021 - 20 September 2021		
Maulvi Muhammad Qasim Khalid	21 September 2021 - June 2022		
Maulvi Ahmad Taha	June 2022 - 4 May 2023		
Qari Mohammad Ayub Khalid	4 May 2023 - 25 June 2023		
Qudratullah Abu Hamza	26 June 2023 - present		

== See also ==
- List of current governors of Afghanistan
