= Sher Mohammad Akhundzada =

Governor of Afghanistan

Sher Mohammad Akhundzada شیر محمد آخوندزاده

Governor of Helmand
- In office 2001–2005
- Preceded by: Mullah Abdul Bari
- Succeeded by: Mohammad Daoud

Personal details
- Born: Helmand province, Afghanistan
- Occupation: Politician

Sher Mohammed Akhundzada (Pashto: شیر محمد آخوندزاده) (also known as Sher Ahmed Akhundzada) is an Alizai tribal leader who was the Governor of Helmand in Afghanistan from 2001 to 2005. As governor, he implemented various agricultural projects in Helmand, including canal excavation from the Kajaki dam for irrigation and electricity generation projects. He was deeply involved in opium production and smuggling, leading to his removal from office by the Afghan government in 2005 after lobbying by the British, who were leading counter-narcotic efforts in Afghanistan at the time. He was succeeded as governor of Helmand by Mohammad Daoud.

== Early life ==
Sher Mohammed was born to the Akhundzada family in northern Helmand province, Afghanistan, which played an important role in the Soviet–Afghan War. Belonging to the main tribe of Helmand, the Alizais, they hailed from the district of Musa Qala. His uncle was Mohammad Nasim Akhundzada who became a leading jihadi commander in Helmand. After Nasim was assassinated in 1990, his brother Rasul Akhundzada (Sher Mohammad's father) became governor of Helmand. Another brother, Abdul Ghafar Akhundzada, became governor when Rasul died of cancer. Abdul Ghafar was assassinated in Quetta, Pakistan on 18 March 2000.

== Governor of Helmand ==
Sher Mohammed Akhundzada was appointed as Governor by the President Hamid Karzai in 2001 and served until 2005.

He identified agricultural projects to be implemented in Helmand such as the excavation of a canal from the Kajaki Dam to irrigate northern Helmand, construction of an intake on Musa Qala River to irrigate the arable lands and generate electricity, and construction of an intake on Helmand River in Kamal Khan to irrigate unproductive farms.

Sher Mohammad was also deeply involved in the production and smuggling of opium. He also led efforts to disarm the tribal militias in Helmand. This was supposed to pave the way for the creation of a national Afghan army as the United States had requested. However, in reality, Sher Mohammed used this to disarm rival tribes and take control of their territory and opium. This had the effect of weakening Helmand's defenses, leaving it vulnerable to attacks by the Taliban.

In June 2005 Sher Mohammad's compound was raided by US forces, which claimed to have found a large stash of opium. Britain—which had been designated the "lead nation" for counter-narcotics activities in Afghanistan—successfully lobbied for Sher Muhammad's deposition before deploying ISAF forces to Helmand.

Sher Mohammad Akhundzada acknowledged that his administration had indeed been storing opium in specially built compounds, but claimed that they had done so with the intent of handing it over to the Interior Ministry for disposal. Nobody believed in this explanation, and in December 2005, President Karzai reluctantly replaced Akhundzada as governor with Mohammad Daoud. Although Daoud was well-regarded by the ISAF coalition for his charm, openness, and English proficiency, unlike Akhundzada he had no tribal base in Helmand and was forced to rely heavily on British support to assert influence.

== Hazara Persecution in Helmand ==
According to the US Department of State's International Religious Freedom Report 2004, in "January 2003, the Governor of Helmand confiscated approximately 200 Hazara-owned shops in Lashkar Gah and distributed them to other town residents. The Governor also blocked the Hazara/Shi'a community from building a mosque in Lashkar Gah. While the Human Rights Commission and the UN had reached an agreement in February 2003with the Governor to compensate Hazara shopkeepers with land elsewhere in Lashkar Gah, the Governor had only partly honored this agreement by the end of period covered by this report."

== Post-governorship ==
During a testimony to the House of Commons Defense Committee in January 2006, the removal of Akhundzada was welcomed as a "step in the right direction", that would help further the British effort in Helmand. However, one committee member cautioned that "the removal of somebody who is a governor from office when in the past he has been one of the warlords does not remove him from his ability to cause a lot of problems for the area and for British troops when they arrive"

Following his removal as governor, Sher Mohammad sought vengeance by aiding the resurgence of the Taliban insurgency in Helmand. He released 3,000 of his tribesmen to join the Taliban and spread rumors that the British had come to Helmand to steal the local people's opium revenue and avenge their historical defeat at the Battle of Maiwand 126 years earlier. President Hamid Karzai later expressed regret over the decision to sack Sher Mohammad, acknowledging: "I made the mistake of listening to [the British]. And when they came in, the Taliban came."

Talking to journalists in Kabul on March 3, 2008, Sher Muhammad Akhundzada claimed that while he was governor of Helmand for four years, NATO did not drop a single bomb on the province, no civilians were killed, and no districts fell to the Taliban. "If I were still there, I am sure things would be the same as before," he said.

During the 2009 presidential election, Akhundzada, along with Ahmed Wali Karzai, a half-brother of the incumbent president, was accused of buying up voter registration cards in Helmand Province.

Preceded by Mullah Abdul Bari	Governor of Helmand Province, Afghanistan; 2001–2005	Succeeded by Mohammad Daoud
