= Mohammad Nabi Safi =

Afghan politician

Mohammad Nabi Safi also known as "Rahimullah", is an Afghan politician who previously served as deputy governor of Kapisa Province, Afghanistan.
