= Qudratullah Abu Hamza =

Governor of Kunar province

Maulvi Qudratullah Abu Hamza
- مولوي قدرت الله ابو حمزه
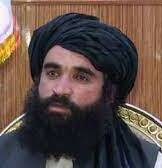

Governor of Kunar
- Incumbent
- Assumed office 26 June 2023
- Preceded by: Mohammad Ayub Khalid

Governor of Zabul
- In office 6 October 2022 – 26 June 2023
- Preceded by: Bismillah Abdullah
- Succeeded by: Hizbullah Afghan

Governor of Balkh
- In office 15 August 2021 – 6 October 2022
- Preceded by: Mohammad Farhad Azimi
- Succeeded by: Daud Muzamil

Military service
- Allegiance: Islamic Emirate of Afghanistan
- Branch/service: Islamic Emirate Army
- Rank: Commander
- Battles/wars: 2021 Taliban offensive

Maulvi Qudratullah Abu Hamza (Pashto: مولوي قدرت الله ابو حمزه) is an Afghan Taliban politician and commander who served as governor of Balkh province from August 2021 until 6 October 2022.

Hamza then served as Governor of Zabul from 6 October to 26 June 2023. Upon stepping down as the Governor of Zabul, his position was replaced by Hizbullah Afghan. Afterward, he serves as Governor of Kunar from 26 June 2023 until present.
