= List of governors of Baghlan =

This is a list of the governors of the province of Baghlan, Afghanistan.

== Governors of Baghlan Province ==
Governor	Period	Extra	Note
Mohammad Hashim Safi	1964-1966		
Muhammad Baqi Yusufzai	1966-1968		
Abdur Rahim Sharif	1968-1969		
Sultan Aziz Zikria	1969-?		
Roshan Dil Wardak	~1970 ?		
Pohanmal Guldad	~1978 ?		
Adil Zurmati	~1981 ?		
Mamoor Ghayyur	? ?		
Sayed Mansur Naderi	? ?		A Sayed Kayan, a traditional Ismailli religious minority leader
Sayed Jafar Naderi	~1989; ~1996		Son of Mansur, also a Sayed Kayan
Mullah Abdol Jabar Omari	? ?		Taliban government
Maulavi Nurullah Nuri	? 2001		Taliban government
Mohammad Omar	2001; 2003		Was a governor in 2003
----	- -		
Juma Khan Hamdard	4 February 2005; 4 September 2005		Was appointed in February 2005
Mohammad Alam Rasikh	4 September 2005; 26 July 2006		Was a governor in Feb 2006
Sayyed Ikramuddin	26 July 2006; 8 November 2007		
Alam Ishaqzai	8 November 2007; January 2008		
Abdul Jabar Haqbeen	January 2008; 12 January 2009		
Mohammad Akbar Barakzai	12 January 2009; 2010		
Munshi Abdul Majid	April 2010; 19 September 2012		
Sultan Mohammad Ebadi	20 September 2012; 7 October 2015		
Abdul Sattar Bariz	8 October 2015; March 2017		
Abdul Hai Naimati	March 2017; Unknown		
Taj Mohammad Jahid	July 2020; Unknown		
Maulvi Nisar Ahmad	2021 - 7 November 2021		
Qari Bakhtiar Muaz	7 November 2021 – present		

== See also ==
- List of current governors of Afghanistan

== Notes ==
Bibliography:

- Adamec, Ludwig W. (1975). Historical and Political Who's Who of Afghanistan. Graz: Akademische Druck- u. Verlagsanstalt. ISBN 9783201009218.
