= List of governors of Nimruz =

This is a list of the governors of the province of Nimruz, Afghanistan

== List ==
Governor	Period	Extra	Note
Din Muhammad Delawar	1895-1966	First governor of the newly formed Nimruz Province	
Abdul Qadir Qazi	1966-1968		
Mir Aminuddin Ansari	1968-1971		
Haji Muhammad Asif	1971-1972		
Sakhi Ahmad Farhad	1972-?		
Hamidullah Niyazmand	1995	Appointed as first Taliban governor of Nimruz and a member of the local Brahui ethnic group	
Mullah Ghani	1995	Removed from power in Mujahideen counter-attack on Zaranj	
Abdul Ghani Baradar	1995		
Sher Malang	1995-?	Believed Pakistani, Pashto speaker	
Muhammad Rasul	?-2001	Founded a new capital city for Nimruz at Khashrod District, called Ghurghuri	
Abdul Karim Barahavi	2001-2005	Appointed after the fall of the Taliban government	
Ghulam Dastagir Azad	2005-2010		
Abdul Qadir Qazi	1866-1968		
Abdul Karim Barahavi	August 2010–September 2012	Appointed August 2010 and dismissed September 2012	
Mohammad Sarwar Subat	20 September 2012–10 March 2014		
Amir Muhammad Akhundzada	12 March 2014–19 May 2015		
Mohammad Samiullah	2015-	Appointed Governor May 2015	
Sayed Wali Sultan	?-?		
Abdul Khaliq Abid	2021-7 November 2021	under Islamic Emirate of Afghanistan	
Najibullah Rafi	7 November 2021-2023	under Islamic Emirate of Afghanistan	
Mohammad Qasim Khaled	2023-2025	under Islamic Emirate of Afghanistan	
Abdul Manaan Mahmood	2025-present		
