= Abdul Haq Shafaq =

Afghan politician

Abdul Haq Shafaq عبدالحق شفق
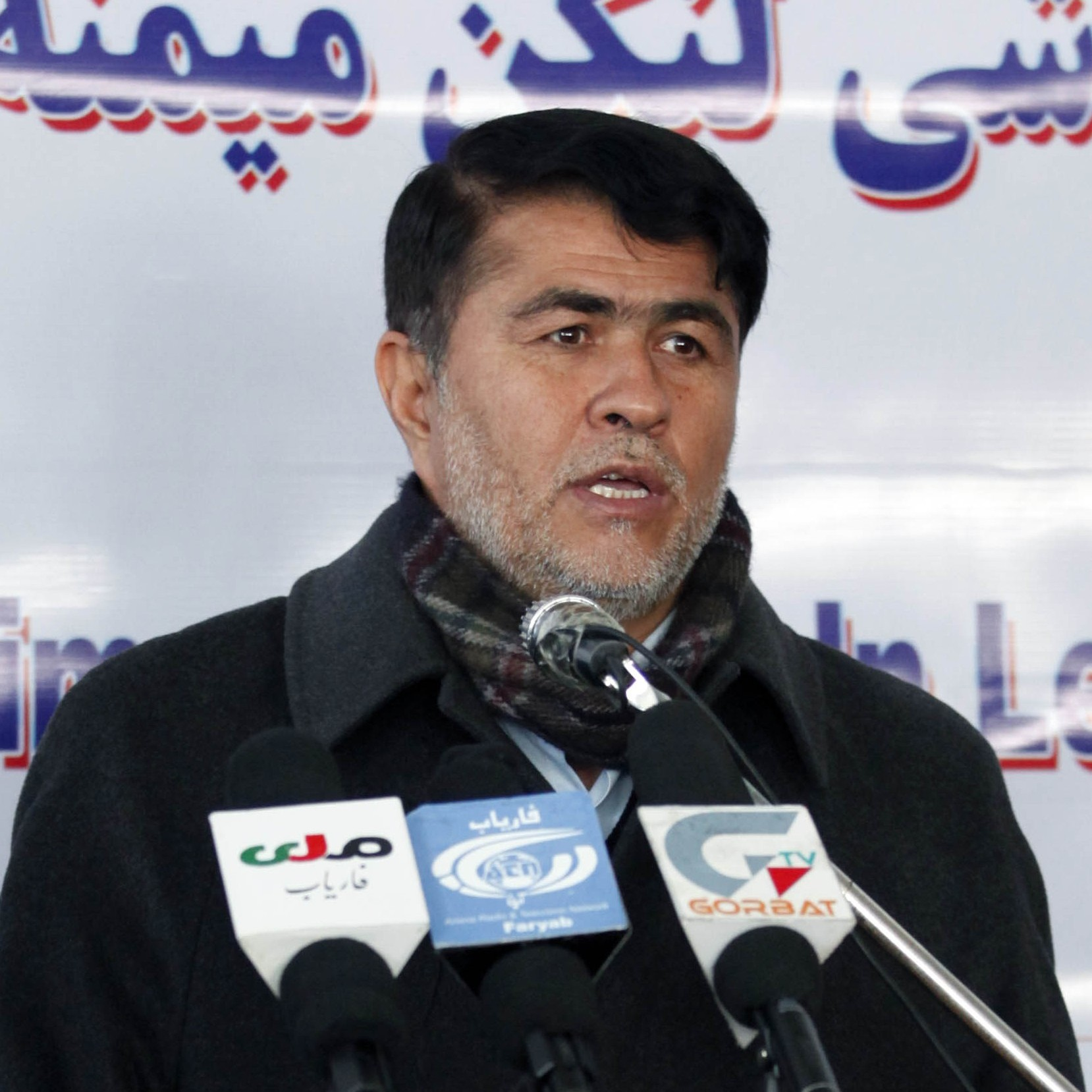
- Abdul Haq Shafaq in January 2012

Governor of Faryab
- In office 9 June 2018 – 5 July 2018
- Preceded by: Muhammad Humayun Fuzi
- Succeeded by: Naqibullah Faiq

Governor of Daykundi
- In office 5 May 2013 – 4 June 2015
- Preceded by: Qurban Ali Oruzgani
- Succeeded by: Masooma Muradi

Governor of Samangan
- In office June 2006 – November 2007
- Preceded by: Amir Latif
- Succeeded by: Enayatullah Enayat

Governor of Sar-e Pol
- In office 2004–2007
- Preceded by: Taj Mohammad Kohi
- Succeeded by: Sayyed Mohammad Eqbal Munib

Governor of Faryab
- In office 2007 – 13 August 2012
- Preceded by: Aamir Latif
- Succeeded by: Mohammadullah Batash

Personal details
- Born: 1961 (age 64–65) Charbagh village, Sar-e Pol District, Afghanistan
- Party: Hezbe Wahdat
- Profession: Politician
- Ethnicity: Hazara

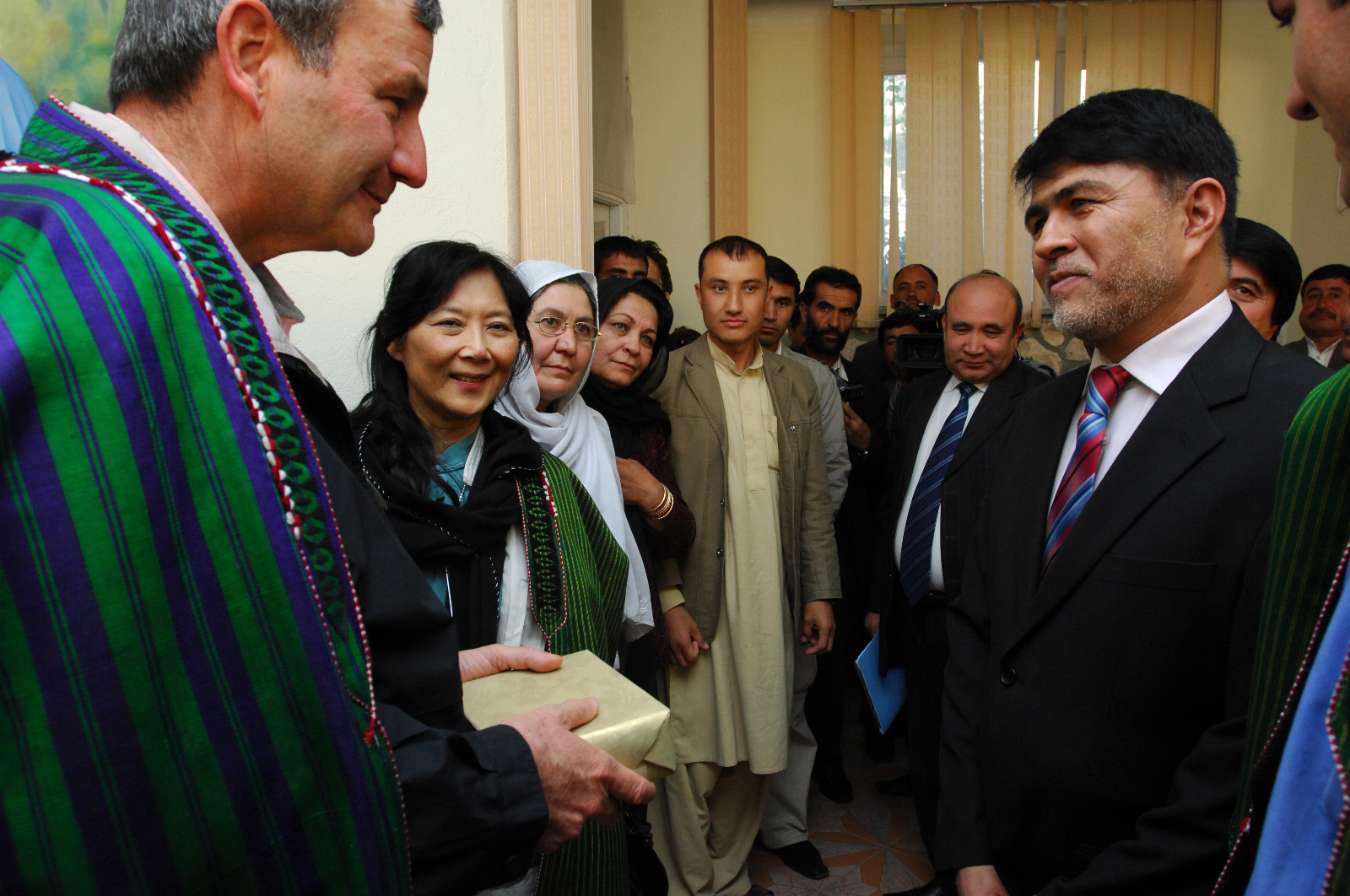
Shafaq and Karl Eikenberry in October 2009

Abdul Haq Shafaq (Dari: عبدالحق شفق) is an ethnic Hazara politician in Afghanistan. He is the former governor of Faryab, Daykundi, Samangan, and Sar-e Pol provinces.

Abdul Haq Shafaq is former commander of the Hezbe Wahdat. After the fall of the Taliban he was appointed governor of Sar-e Pol Province. In 2004, Abdul Haq Shafaq switched to the province of Samangan. He was appointed governor of Takhar in 2019, left that position, and became governor of Sare Pul Province again on 20 June 2021.

== See also ==
- List of Hazara people

Preceded by Abdul Latif Ibrahimi	Governor of Faryab; 2006–Present	Succeeded by Incumbent
