= Abdul Latif Ibrahimi =

Afghan politician (1958–2021)

Governor of Takhar, Afghanistan
- In office 13 October 2009 – 18 March 2010
- Preceded by: Ghulam Qawis Abubaker
- Succeeded by: Abdul Jabbar Taqwa
- In office 9 July 2013 – 7 October 2015
- Preceded by: Maj. Gen. Ahmad Faisal Begzad
- Succeeded by: Yasin Zia

Governor of Faryab, Afghanistan
- In office 2004–2005
- Preceded by: Enayatullah Enayat
- Succeeded by: Aamir Latif

Governor of Kunduz, Afghanistan
- In office 2002–2004
- Succeeded by: Engineer Mohammad Omar

Personal details
- Born: 17 October 1958 Kunduz, Afghanistan
- Died: 9 June 2021 (aged 62) Kabul, Afghanistan

Abdul Latif Ibrahimi (17 October 1958 – 9 June 2021) was a Governor of the Afghan Provinces of Kunduz, Samangan, Faryab and Takhar.

== Biography ==
Abdul Latif Ibrahimi was member of the Ibrahims Clan, a predominant family in the Imam Sahib district in Kunduz. Imam Sahib is situated on the border with Tajikistan. It is a fertile agrarian district. Accordingly, the district is strategically very significant. The people of Imam Sahib loved Ibrahimi, he was very humble person. After the war Abdul Latif Ibrahimi became Governor of the Province. He was removed two years later and served a short term as Governor of Faryab and of Takhar.

Ibrahimi died from COVID-19 in Kabul on 9 June 2021, at age 62, during the COVID-19 pandemic in Afghanistan.

== Notes ==
Preceded by Ghulam Qawis Abubaker	Governor of Takhar, Afghanistan; 2009–2010	Succeeded by Abdul Jabbar Taqwa

Preceded by Enayatullah Enayat	Governor of Faryab, Afghanistan; 2004–2005	Succeeded by Aamir Latif

Preceded by [?]	Governor of Kunduz, Afghanistan; 2002–2004	Succeeded by Engineer Mohammad Omar
