= Arif Khan (warlord) =

Afghan Mujahideen warlord

- Died: April 4, 2000; Peshawar, Pakistan
- Cause of death: Assassination by gunshot
- Allegiance: Islamic State of Afghanistan (defected); Islamic Emirate of Afghanistan
- Battles / wars: War in Afghanistan †

Arif Khan or Mohammad Arif Khan was a Mujahideen warlord in Afghanistan and Pashtun leader from the village of Zakhel. He was a military commander and the Taliban governor of Kunduz province. An account indicated that he might have served under or was associated with the militant commander Eshan-Sayad Mirza.

Khan was reportedly killed on April 4, 2000. His death came with the killing of top Hizb-ul-Mujahideen commanders. Khan was also accused of killing numerous tribal leaders in Kunduz in order to consolidate power.

== See also ==
- List of Taliban leaders
