= Abdul Khaliq Abid =

Deputy Governor of Zabul Province

Maulvi Abdul Khaliq Abid
- Pashto: مولوی عبدالخالق عابد

Deputy Governor of Zabul Province
- Incumbent
- Assumed office 7 November 2021
- Prime Minister: Hasan Akhund
- Emir: Hibatullah Akhundzada

Governor of Nimruz
- In office August 2021 – 6 November 2021
- Prime Minister: Hasan Akhund
- Emir: Hibatullah Akhundzada
- Succeeded by: Najibullah Rafi

Maulvi Abdul Khaliq Abid (Pashto: مولوی عبدالخالق عابد) is an Afghan Taliban politician who is currently serving as Deputy Governor of Zabul Province since 7 November 2021. He has also served as Governor of Nimruz Province from August 2021 to 6 November 2021.
