= Daizangi =

Region in Afghanistan

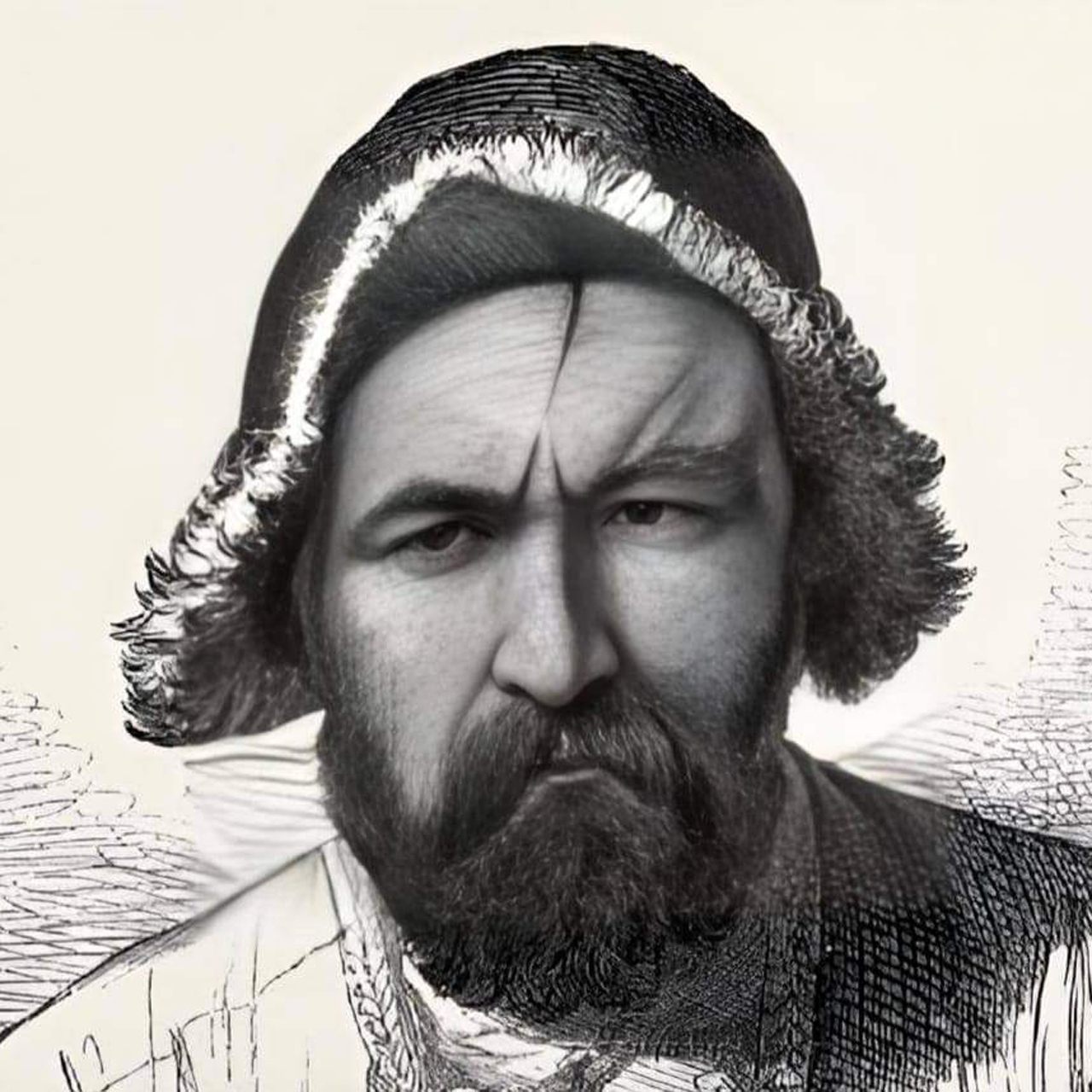
Portrait of a Hazara man from Daizangi, 1879

Daizangi (Dari: دایزنگی) is one of the large and historical residential areas of Hazaristan (Hazarajat) in the central region of Afghanistan.

== Geography ==
Daizangi includes Panjab (Bamyan), Waras (Bamyan), Yakawlang (Bamyan), Lal Sarjangal (Ghor), and part of Sharistan (Daikundi).

== Demographics ==
The residents of Daizangi are the Hazara people who speak the Hazaragi and Dari dialects of Persian.

== Famous people from Daizangi ==
- Abdul Ali Mazari
- Qorban Kohestani
- Zahir Howaida
- General Khodaidad
- Murad Ali Murad
- Jafar Mahdavi
- Safdar Tawakoli

== See also ==
- Daizangi tribe
