= Sayed Anwar Rahmati =

Afghanistan politician

Sayed Anwar Rahmati سید انور رحمتی
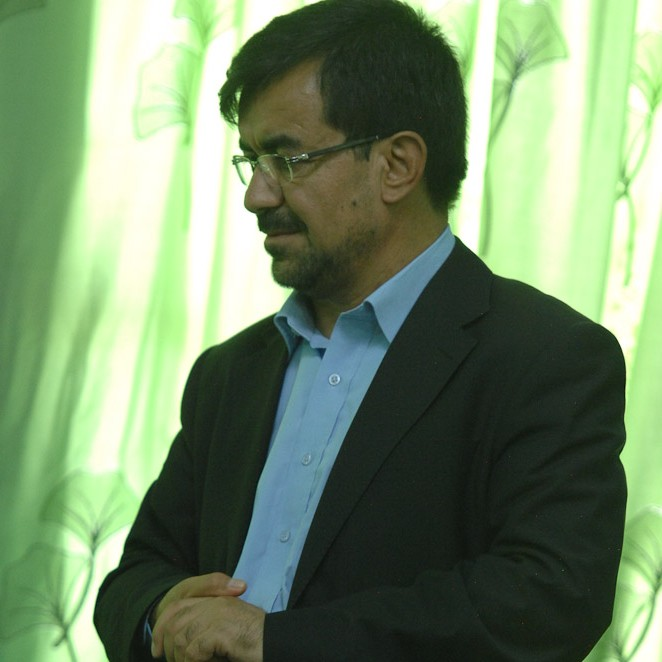
- Rahmati in June 2011

Governor of Daykundi
- In office November 22, 2018 – 2020
- Preceded by: Mahmoud Baligh
- Succeeded by: Muhammad Zia Hamdard

Governor of Sar-e Pol
- In office May 25, 2010 – April 3, 2012
- Preceded by: Mohammad Bashir Qant Chah Abi
- Succeeded by: Abdul Jabar Haqbeen

Governor of Ghor
- In office August 27, 2012 – June 27, 2015
- Preceded by: Aqahi Abdullah Heiwad Haiwad
- Succeeded by: Seema Jowenda

Personal details
- Born: 1959 (age 66–67) Yakawlang, Bamyan, Afghanistan

Anwar Rahmati (Persian: انور رحمتی; born 1959) is a politician in Afghanistan. He served as governor of Bamyan province in 2021, after he served as governor of Daykundi province beginning on November 22, 2018. Previously he served as Governor of Sar-e Pol from May 25, 2010, to April 3, 2012, and as Governor of Ghor from August 27, 2012, to June 27, 2015. Between 2004 and 2010 he was chief of staff to Karim Khalili.

== Early life ==
Sayyed Anwar Rahmati, Son of Sayyed Rahmat, was born in 1959 in Yakawlang district of Bamyan province. He studied his primary and middle school at his home district. He graduated from agriculture high school of Herat province in 1979. He is from Sadat ethnicity.

== See also ==
- List of current governors of Afghanistan

== Notes ==
Preceded by Mohammad Bashir Qant Chah Abi	Governor of Sar-e Pol; 25 May 2010-3 April 2012	Succeeded by Abdul Jabar Haqbeen
