= Qurban Ali =

Qurban Ali may refer to:

- Qurban Ali Khan (governor), former governor of the Khyber-Pakhtunkhwa of Pakistan
- Qurban Ali Oruzgani, current governor of Daykundi Province of Afghanistan
- Qurban Ali, man convicted of rape in 2016 in northern England
