= Sayed Anwar Azad =

Sayed Anwar Azad سید انور آزاد
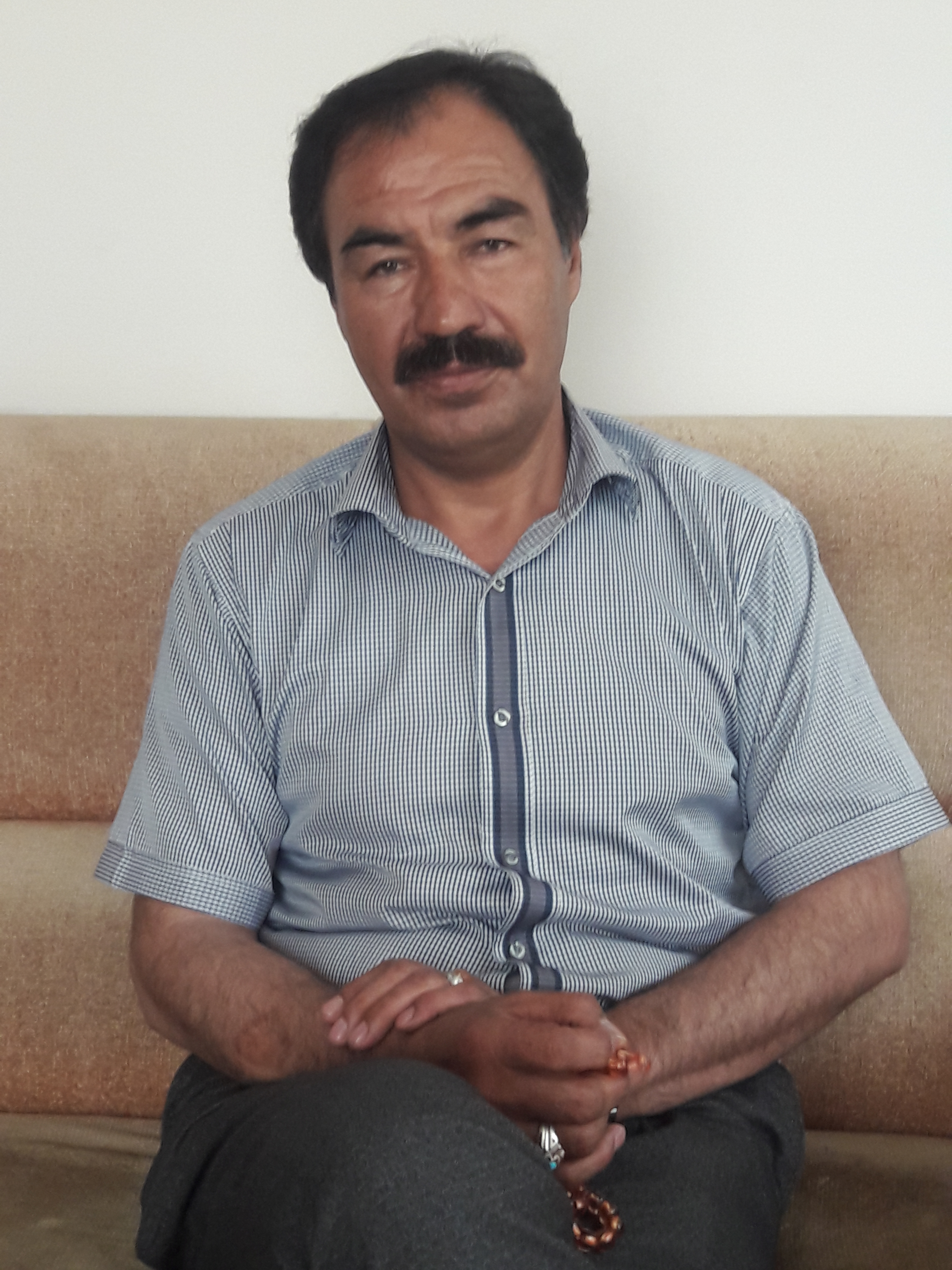

Background information
- Born: 1969 (age 55–56); Yakawlang, Bamyan, Kingdom of Afghanistan
- Instrument: Dambura

Sayed Anwar Azad (Dari: سید انور آزاد) is an ethnic Hazara folkloric singer from Afghanistan. He plays folkloric and regional traditional Hazara music on the dambura.

== Early life ==
Seyed Anwar Azad was born in 1969, in Yakawlang, Bamyan, Afghanistan. In 1989, when he was about 20 years old, he turned to the Hazara folkloric and regional traditional music of dambura based on his artistic motives.
