= Ibrahim Malikzada =

Afghan politician

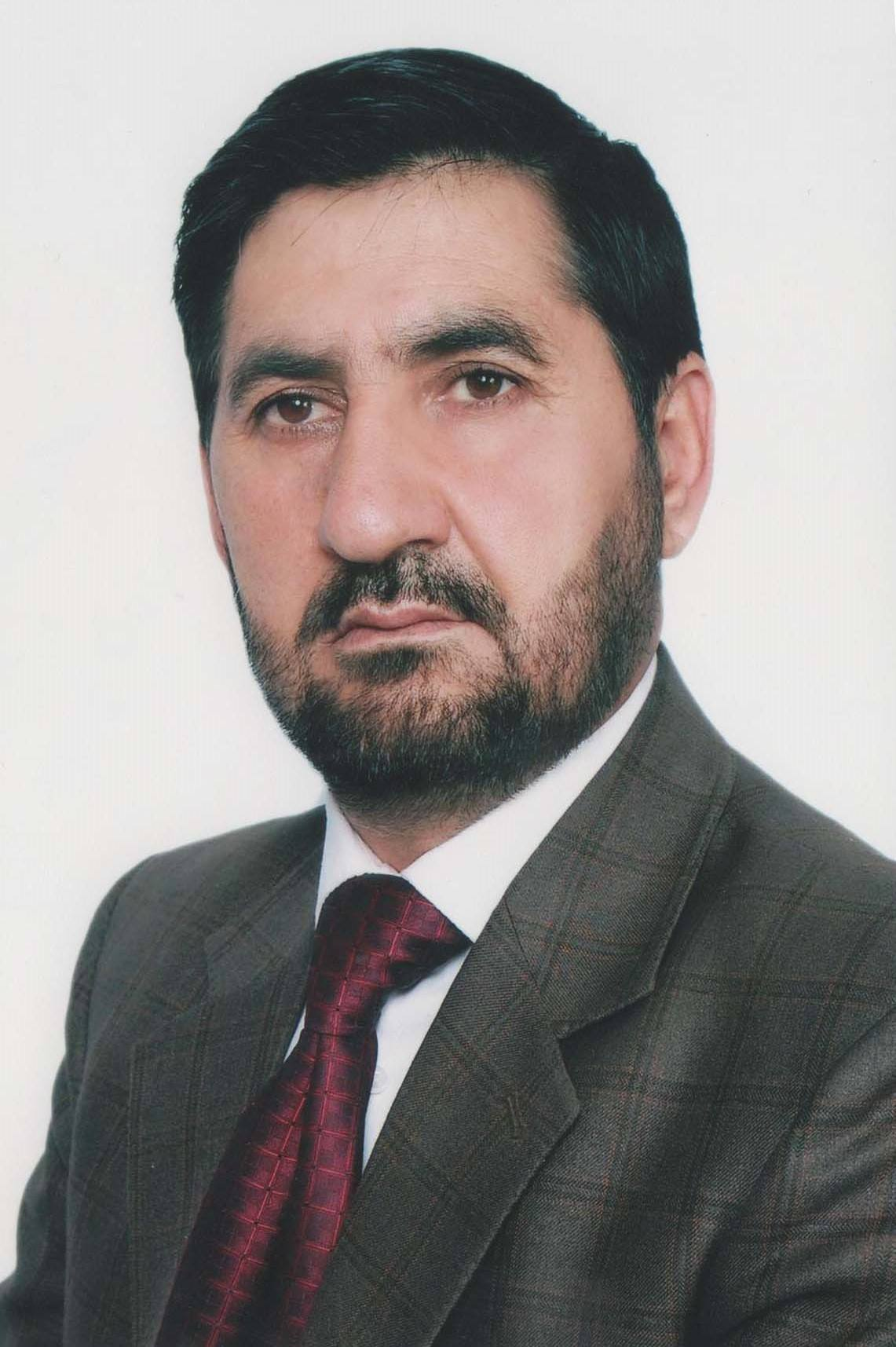
Mohammad Ibrahim Malekzada

Mohammad Ibrahim Malekzada (محمد ابراهیم ملکزاده) (born 1966) was an Afghan politician and military commander who played a role in the resistance movements during the Soviet–Afghan War and later during the conflict against the Taliban. He was the first Governor of Ghor after the defeat of the Taliban in 2001, and he later served as a security advisor within the Afghan Ministry of Interior, and Member of the National Assembly representing Ghor Province. Malekzada was also associated with the political party Jamiat-e Islami Afghanistan. He is the son of Abdul Rahman Malekzada and is of Tajik descent.

== Early life and education ==
Malekzada completed elementary education in Ghor province. During Jihad, in 1960s, he continued his Science and Islamic education and he acquired expertise in Medicine from (ICC). Between 1985 and 1987, Malekzada pursued medical training with a focus on pediatrics. After completing his training, he returned to Afghanistan and established a clinic with medical equipment provided through humanitarian support organizations. He worked for approximately two years providing healthcare services in his home region.

He was involved in the health services according to the needs of the region until the Fall of 1981.

== Involvement in the resistance ==
During the Soviet–Afghan War and the subsequent civil conflicts in Afghanistan, Malekzada became involved in the armed resistance movements. In 1990, following the death of his elder brother, Commander Mohammad Taher Malekzada, he assumed leadership of resistance forces in Tiwara District of Ghor Province.

Despite limited prior military experience, Malekzada took part in organizing and leading military operations in Ghor Province and surrounding regions. The area became an important base of resistance activity during the conflicts that followed.

Following the rise of the Taliban in the mid-1990s, Malekzada participated in resistance efforts aligned with forces loyal to President Burhanuddin Rabbani and military commander Ahmad Shah Massoud. Resistance activities in Ghor Province and nearby areas were supported through logistical networks connecting the region with northern Afghanistan. After, Ahmad Shah Massoud, he was the only figure in the provinces of Southern and Western Afghanistan fighting the Taliban.

== Government Service ==
After the fall of Taliban in 2001, he served as the Governor of Ghor province. In the first parliamentary elections in Afghanistan, he was elected as a member of a House of People for the Ghor province.

Following the fall of the Taliban regime in 2001, he entered public office in the newly established Afghan government. He was appointed Governor of Ghor Province, where he served in a role focused on regional governance and stability.

In 2005, Malekzada was elected as a Member of Parliament representing Ghor Province in the Afghan National Assembly. He received one of the highest numbers of votes among candidates from the province and later continued to represent the region in subsequent parliamentary terms.

During his political career, he was also a member of the Leadership Council of Jamiat-e Islami Afghanistan, a major political party with roots in the anti-Soviet resistance movement.

=== Role in the Taiwara conflict (2017) ===
During the Taliban offensives of 2017, Malekzada was involved in the defense of his home district of Taiwara in Ghor Province. According to reporting by The New York Times, he traveled from Kabul to Taiwara and mobilized local fighters to support government forces resisting a Taliban assault on the district.

The district experienced several days of heavy fighting before Taliban forces captured it on 23 July 2017. Local officials reported that Taliban fighters gathered from multiple provinces and launched a large-scale offensive against the district center. Malekzada and fighters loyal to him participated in the defense but eventually withdrew after expected reinforcements and air support from government forces did not arrive.

In an interview with The New York Times, Malekzada described the intensity of the fighting, stating that many of his fighters were killed during the clashes. The newspaper reported that local militias organized by Malekzada constituted a significant part of the resistance after an Afghan commando unit in the district had already been defeated.

The Taliban briefly controlled the district following the battle, during which government facilities were burned and civilians were reportedly killed. Afghan commandos, supported by Afghan and United States airpower, later retook Taiwara several days after its capture.

According to The New York Times, Afghan officials subsequently viewed the remaining fighters loyal to Malekzada—estimated at more than one hundred men—as an important force for maintaining control of the district after it was recaptured.

== Death ==
Mohammad Ibrahim Malekzada died on 5 February 2019. His death prompted condolences from Afghan political figures and government institutions. His funeral was attended by political leaders, colleagues, and members of the public. He was buried in the cemetery associated with the Afghan National Assembly in Kabul.

== Legacy ==
Malekzada is remembered in Afghanistan primarily for his role in regional resistance movements during periods of conflict and for his later participation in political and governmental institutions. His career spanned multiple phases of Afghanistan’s modern history, including the Soviet-Afghan War, the civil war period, the Taliban conflict, and the post-2001 political system.

Preceded by None	Governor of Ghor; 2001–2004	Succeeded by Abdul Qadir Alam
