= List of governors of Sar-e Pol =

This is a list of the governors of the province of Sar-e Pol, Afghanistan.

== Governors of Sar-e Pol Province ==
Governor	Period	Extra	Note
Taj Mohammad Kohi	2003; 2004		
Abdul Haq Shafaq	2004; 2007		
Mohammad Eqbal Munib	4 July 2007; August 2008		
Mohammad Bashir Qant Chah Abi	August 2008; 25 May 2010		
Anwar Rahmati	25 May 2010; 3 April 2012		
Abdul Jabar Haqbeen	3 April 2012; 2015		
Mohammad Zahir Wahdat	2015 ?		
Abdul Rahman	7 November 2021; Present		

== See also ==
- List of current governors of Afghanistan
