= Muhammad Eqbal Munib =

Governor of Ghor, Afghanistan

Sayyed Mohammad Eqbal Munib سید محمد اقبال منیب

Governor of Ghor
- In office 1 December 2008 – 25 May 2010
- Preceded by: Baz Mohammad Ahmadi
- Succeeded by: Fazlul Haq Nejat (acting)

Governor of Sar-e Pol
- In office 4 July 2007 – August 2008
- Preceded by: Abdul Haq Shafaq
- Succeeded by: Mohammad Bashir Qant Chah Abi

Personal details
- Died: 14 July 2012 Samangan, Samangan Province, Afghanistan
- Ethnicity: Hazara

Mohammad Eqbal Munib (Dari: محمد اقبال منیب; died in 2012) was a Hazara politician in Afghanistan and the former governor of Ghor. He had previously served as the governor of Sar-e Pol.

As governor of Sar-e Pol, Eqbal Munib survived two attempts on his life. One was on 24 April 2007, a "mine planted near a brook" which was remotely detonated by unidentified people as Munib's car passed by. The blast caused damage to the vehicle but no casualties. No one has claimed responsibility for the attack.

In May 2010 the provincial council of Ghor Province and some civil society organizations wrote a letter to President Hamid Karzai wherein they criticized the performance of Mohammad Eqbal Munib and asked for the dismissal of the governor. Following this, Governor Munib was dismissed by the president due to lack of professionalism.

On 14 July 2012, he was killed in a suicide blast during a wedding party in Samangan, Samangan Province.

== Notes ==
Preceded by Baz Mohammad Ahmadi	Governor of Ghor; 2009-2010	Succeeded by
Preceded by Abdul Haq Shafaq	Governor of Sar-e Pol; 2007-2008	Succeeded by Mohammad Bashir Qant Chah Abi
