= Muhammad Zia Hamdard =

Afghan politician

Governor Muhammad Zia Hamdard

Governor of Daykundi
- In office 14 May 2020 – 12 July 2021
- Preceded by: Sayed Anwar Rahmati
- Succeeded by: Murad Ali Murad

Muhammad Zia Hamdard is an Afghan politician who was appointed as the 14th governor of Daykundi Province on 14 May 2020. He left office on 13 July 2021.
