= Seema Jowenda =

Afghan politician (born 1971)

Seema Jowenda سیما جوینده

Governor of Ghor
- In office 28 June 2015 – 7 November 2015
- Preceded by: Sayed Anwar Rahmati
- Succeeded by: Ghulam Nasir Khaze

Deputy Governor of Kabul
- Incumbent
- Assumed office December 2015

Personal details
- Born: 1971 (age 54–55) Ghor Province, Kingdom of Afghanistan
- Ethnicity: Aimaq

Seema Jowenda (or Sima Joyenda) (Dari: سیما جوینده) is an Afghan politician who is deputy governor of Kabul Province and was previously governor of Ghor province. As of November 2015, she was one of only two women to hold the position of provincial governor in the country. She replaced Sayed Anwar Rahmati in the job.

== Early life ==
Seema Joyenda, daughter of Mirza Gul Aqa Khan, was born in 1971, in Firoz Koh in Ghor, Afghanistan. She is married and has nine children. Joyenda speaks Dari, Pashto and English. Joyenda finished her primary and secondary education at the Tega Temor High School of Ghor province in 2005 and received her fourteenth class certificate from the Teacher’s Training Institute of Ghor in 2009.

== Career ==
Joyenda has worked with women’s organizations, specifically with programs contributing to capacity building for women. She worked as a teacher under the Taliban rule and taught underground courses for girls. After the fall of the Taliban, she continued to work as a teacher at high schools in Ghor province. She has worked in governmental offices, including the Governor’s Office in Ghor and the Rural Development Department. She has also worked in nongovernmental offices, particularly as a provincial trainer for a semi-governmental, rural development organization for over two years, working towards building women’s capacity in Afghanistan. She participated in the Emergency Loya Jirga in 2002, as well as in the Constitutional Loya Jirga in 2003.

Joyenda was appointed governor of Ghor Province in June 2015. After threats and pressure, she was removed from the post in December 2015 and appointed deputy governor of Kabul province in December 2015.
