= Mahmoud Baligh =

Afghan politician

Mahmoud Baligh محمود بلیغ

Governor of Daikundi
- Incumbent
- Assumed office July 26, 2017
- President: Ashraf Ghani
- Preceded by: Masooma Muradi
- Succeeded by: Sayed Anwar Rahmati

Personal details
- Born: 1971 (age 53–54) Daikundi, Afghanistan

Mahmoud Baligh (Dari: محمود بلیغ) is an Afghan politician. He is the former governor of Daykundi province. Baligh was appointed governor of Daykundi on July 26, 2017 instead of Masooma Muradi. On November 22, 2018 Sayed Anwar Rahmati was appointed as the new governor of Daykundi inplace of him.

== Early life ==
Mahmoud Baligh was born in 1971 in Daikundi, Afghanistan.

== See also ==
- List of governors of Daykundi
- List of Hazara people
