= Band-e Amir National Park =

First National Park of Afghanistan

- IUCN category II (national park)
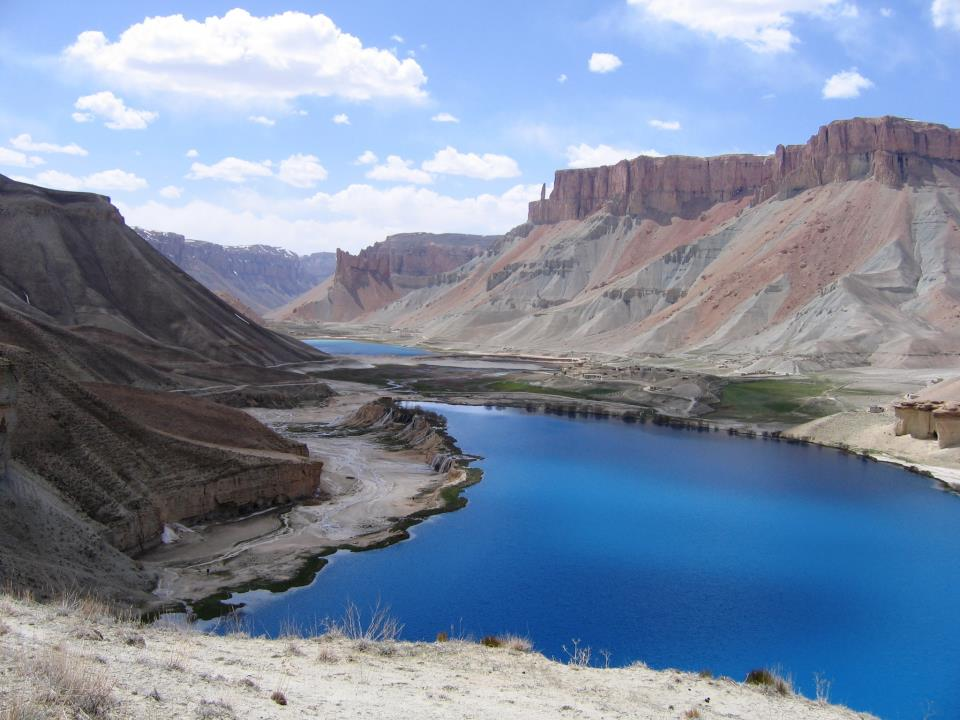
- View of the lakes at the national park in 2012

- Location within Afghanistan
- Interactive map of Band-e Amir National Park
- Location: Bamyan Province, Afghanistan
- Nearest city: Yakawlang, Bamyan
- Coordinates: 34°50′23″N 67°13′51″E
- Area: 606.16 km^{2} (234.04 sq mi)
- Established: May 22, 2009
- Visitors: 169,900 (in 2018)

Band-e Amir National Park (Note: Pashto: د امیر بند ملي پارک Dari: پارک ملی بند امیر) is located in the central Bamyan Province of Afghanistan. It was established on 22 May 2009 as Afghanistan's first national park to promote and protect the natural beauty of a series of intensely blue lakes created by natural dams high in the Hindu Kush. Band-e-Amir is a chain of six lakes in the southern mountainous desert area of the national park. The Balkh River originates here and flows to Balkh Province in the north.

Band-e-Amir is one of the few natural lakes in the world which are created by travertine systems. They were created when water with dissolved minerals oozed out of the faults and fractures deposited calcium carbonate precipitate. Over time, the water deposited layers of the mineral travertine that built up into walls that now contain the water.

The site of Band-e Amir has been described as Afghanistan's Grand Canyon National Park, and draws more than 100,000 local and foreign tourists annually.

== History ==
The name Band-e Amir literally means "the Ruler's Dam" in Dari which is believed by some to be a reference to Ali, the fourth Caliph of the Muslims. The area is dominated by ethnic Hazaras, who are estimated to make up around 30 percent of Afghanistan's population.

In her 1970 guide to Afghanistan, historian Nancy Dupree wrote that a full description about Band-e Amir would "rob the uninitiated of the wonder and amazement it produces on all who gaze upon it". Parts of the 1975 Bollywood film Dharmatma, with Feroz Khan and Hema Malini, were filmed at the Band-e Amir National Park.

Efforts to make Band-e Amir a national park started in the 1970s, but were then put on hold due to the wars. According to CBC who conducted an interview with Mustafa Zahir, who was the head of Afghanistan's Environmental Protection Agency at the time, before Band-e Amir was established as Afghanistan's first national park there were plans to utilize the area for a hydrodam project. This potential threat to the natural beauty and ecological significance of the region prompted Abdullah Barat, a Hazara activist hailing from the Shaidan Valley and the head of the sub-office of Future Generations in Bamyan, to take action recognizing the importance of preserving this pristine landscape. According to Flora MacDonald, the former Foreign Minister of Canada who was working in Afghanistan at the time, Barat embarked on a campaign to sway Mustafa Zahir towards an alternative vision, highlighting the ecological and cultural heritage of the region, and emphasizing its potential as a national treasure rather than a mere resource for development. Barat's efforts ultimately led to a pivotal decision: the designation of Band-e Amir as Afghanistan's first national park.

In 2004, Band-e Amir was submitted for recognition as a World Heritage site. In April 2009, Band-e Amir was finally declared Afghanistan's first national park. This shift in policy also set a precedent for conservation efforts across Afghanistan.

By 2023, the number of local and foreign tourists visiting the Band-e Amir National Park was over 100,000. The area is monitored by park rangers.

== Geography ==
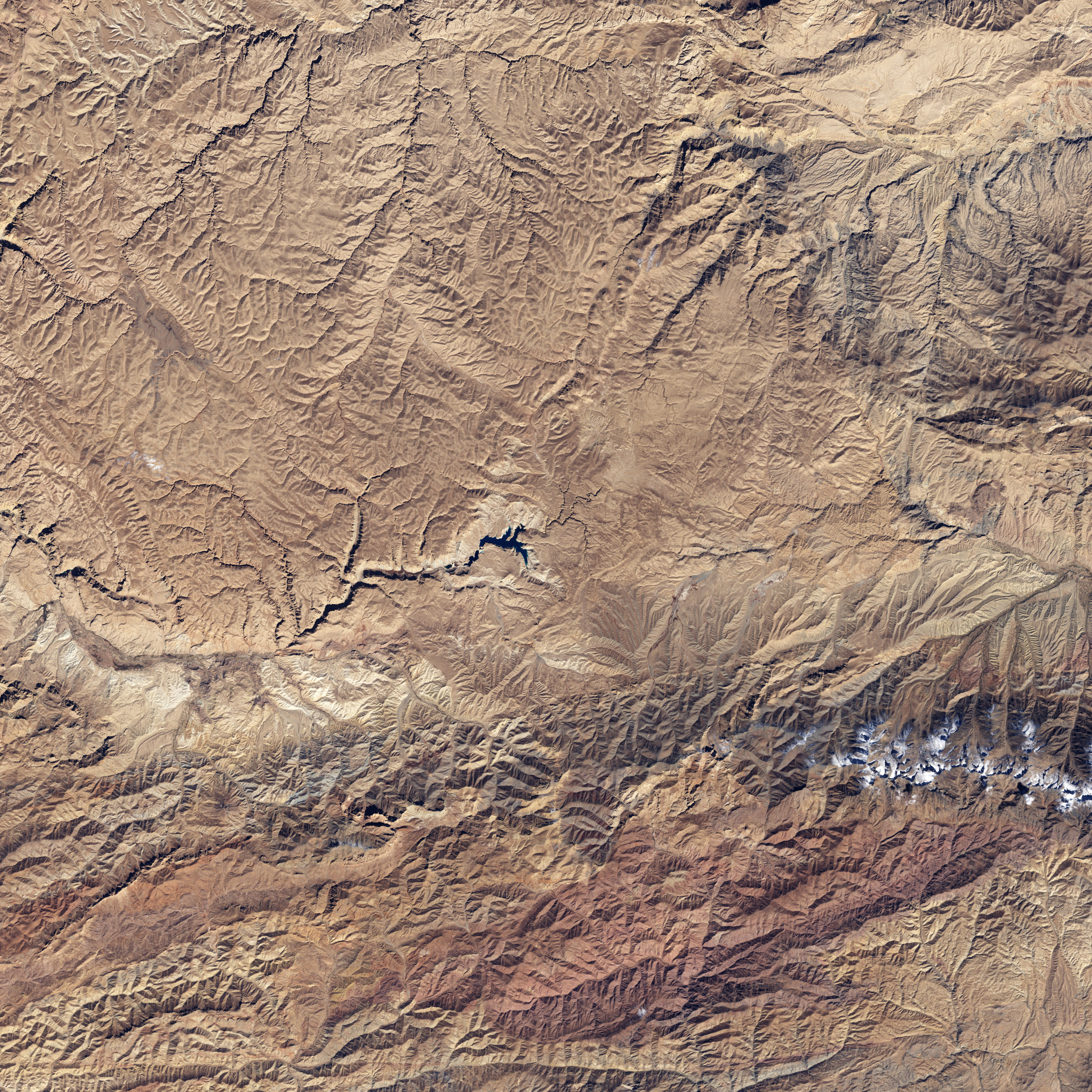
Band-e Amir National Park as seen from space

Band-e Amir is situated at approximately 75 km (47 mi) to the north-west of the ancient city of Bamyan, close to the town of Yakawlang. Together with Bamyan Valley, they are the heart of Afghanistan's tourism, annually attracting over 100,000 local and foreign tourists, as of 2023. The Band-e Amir lakes are primarily a late spring and summertime tourism destination, as the high elevation central Hazarajat region of Afghanistan is extremely cold in winter, with temperatures reaching as low as −20 °C (−4.0 °F). The six constituent lakes of Band-e Amir are:

- Band-e Gholaman (Lake of the slaves)
- Band-e Qambar (Lake of Caliph Ali's slave)
- Band-e Haibat (Lake of grandiose)
- Band-e Panir (Lake of cheese)
- Band-e Pudina (Lake of wild mint)
- Band-e Zulfiqar (Lake of the sword of Ali)

The white travertine dams created by fault lines, which are prevalent in the Band-e Amir Valley, form the barriers between the lakes. Band-e Haibat is the biggest and the deepest of the six, with an average depth of approximately 150 metres, as estimated by the Provincial Reconstruction Team diving team from New Zealand. Another comparable lake is Band-e Azhdahar (The Dragon), located a few kilometres southeast of the town of Bamyan, which has also been created as a result of carbon dioxide rich water oozing out of the faults underground and depositing calcium carbonate precipitate to form the travertine walls of Band-e Amir.

=== Climate ===
High in the Hindu Kush at approximately 2,900 m (9,500 ft) above sea level, the national park has a subarctic climate (Dsc) closely bordering on a warm-summer humid continental climate (Dsb). The climate is extremely severe and the lakes freezing over in winter.

Climate data for Band-e Amir National Park
Month	Jan	Feb	Mar	Apr	May	Jun	Jul	Aug	Sep	Oct	Nov	Dec	Year
Daily mean °C (°F)	−14.2 (6.4)	−11.5 (11.3)	−4.9 (23.2)	2.3 (36.1)	7.3 (45.1)	13.0 (55.4)	14.8 (58.6)	13.8 (56.8)	9.3 (48.7)	2.9 (37.2)	−3.2 (26.2)	−9.9 (14.2)	1.6 (34.9)
Average precipitation mm (inches)	61.9 (2.44)	82.3 (3.24)	86.9 (3.42)	77.5 (3.05)	45.4 (1.79)	6.3 (0.25)	0.0 (0.0)	0.0 (0.0)	0.0 (0.0)	19.4 (0.76)	29.4 (1.16)	44.2 (1.74)	453.3 (17.85)
Source 1: RedPlanet.travel
Source 2: ClimateCharts.net(Precipitation)

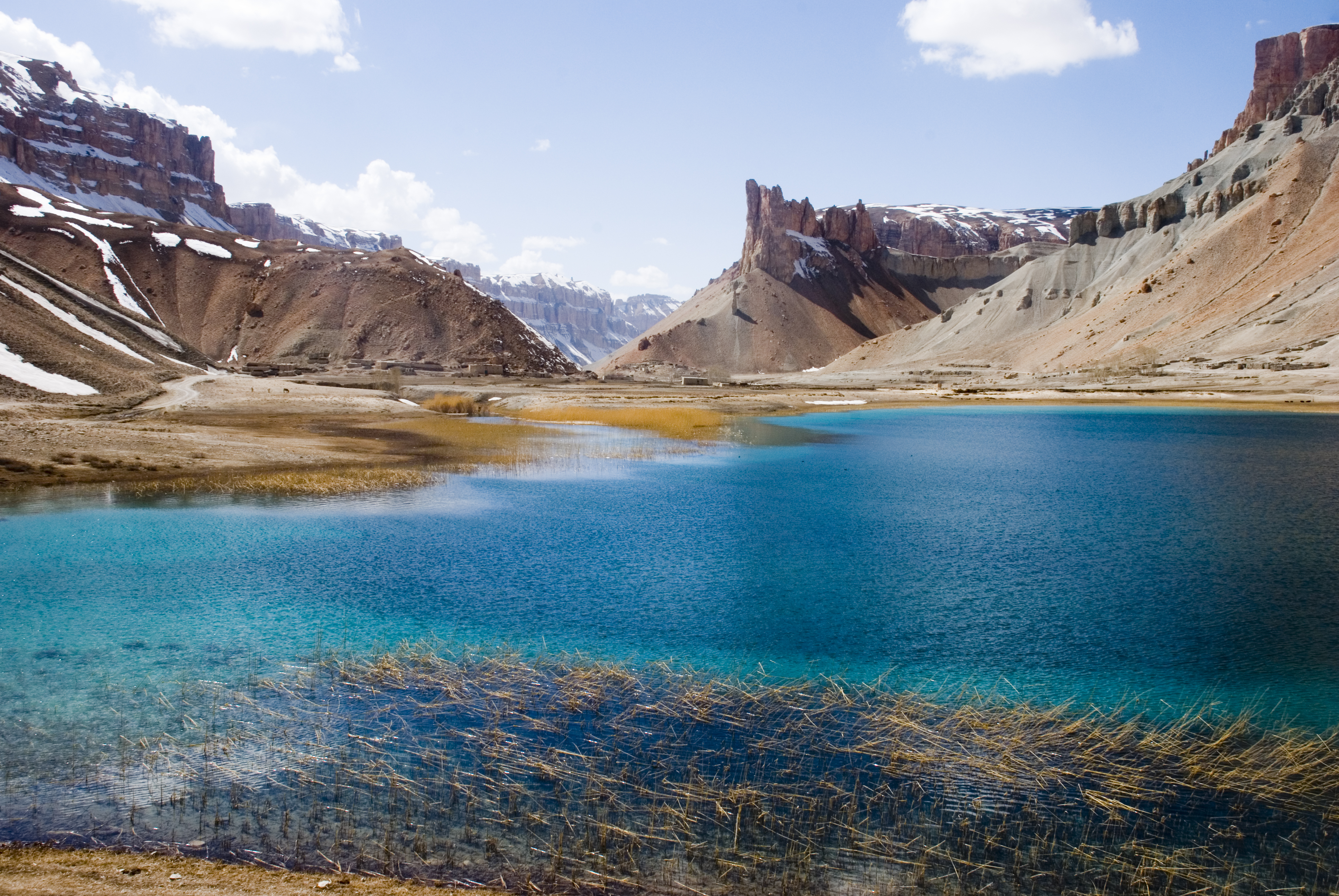

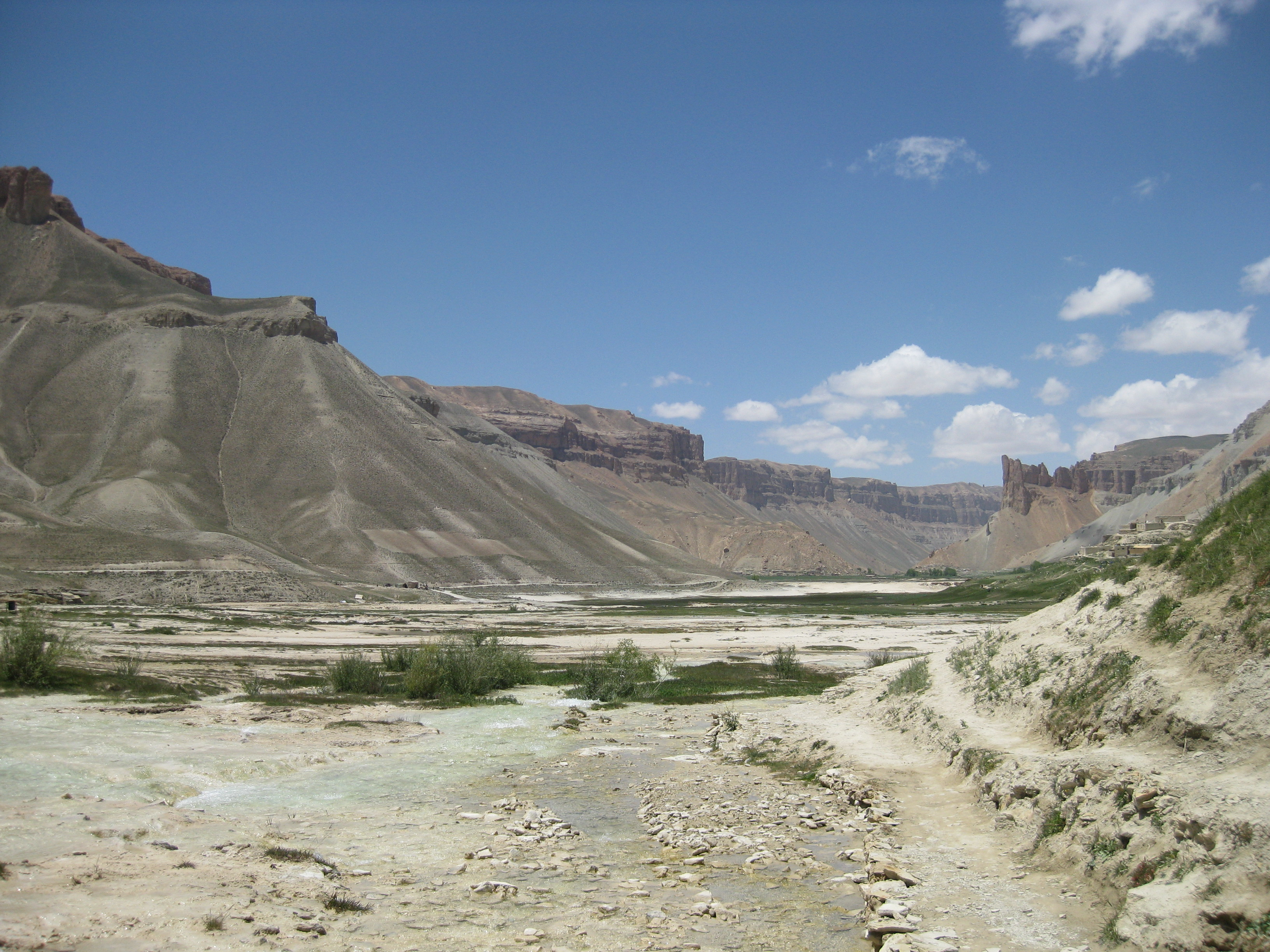

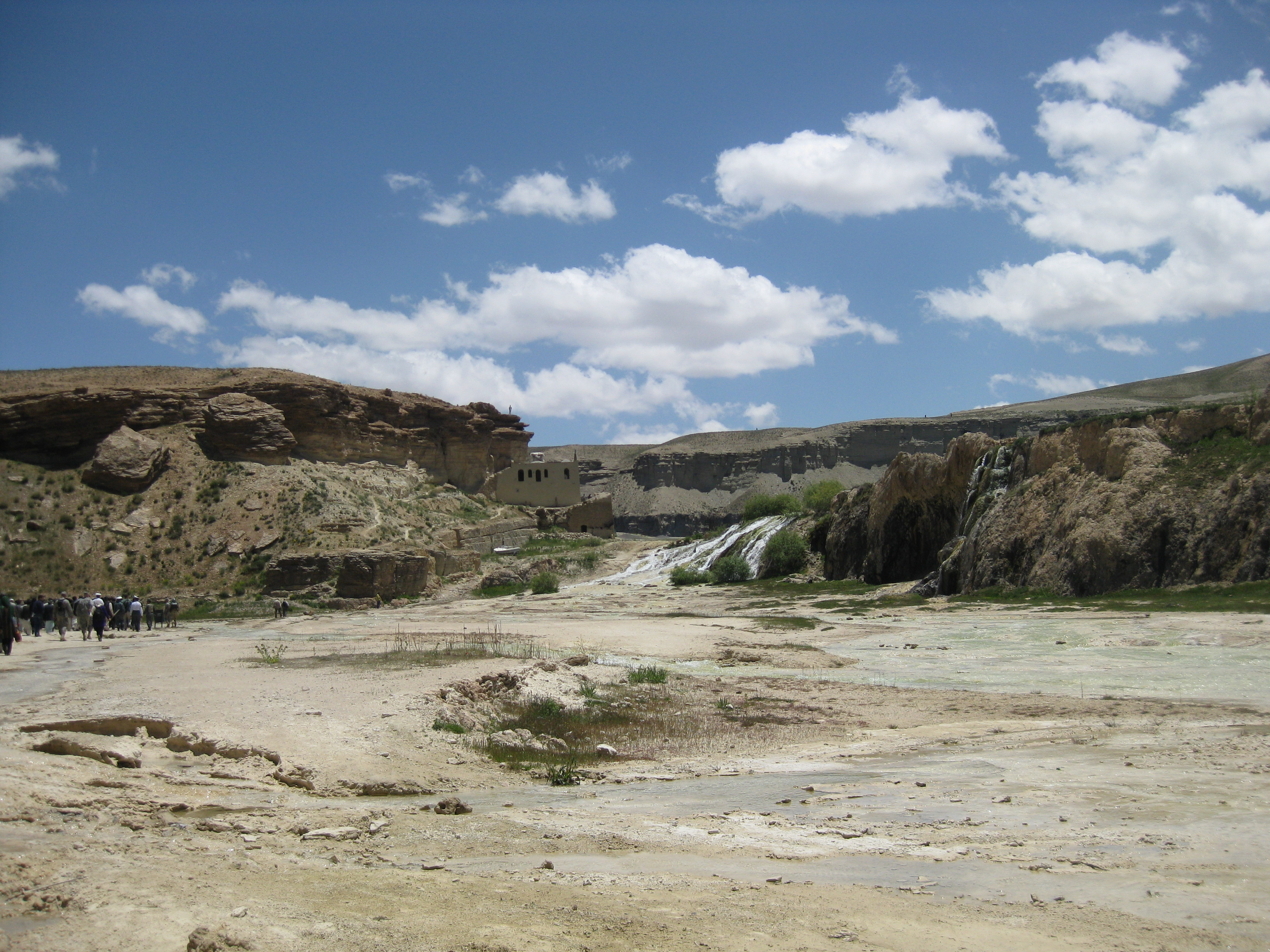

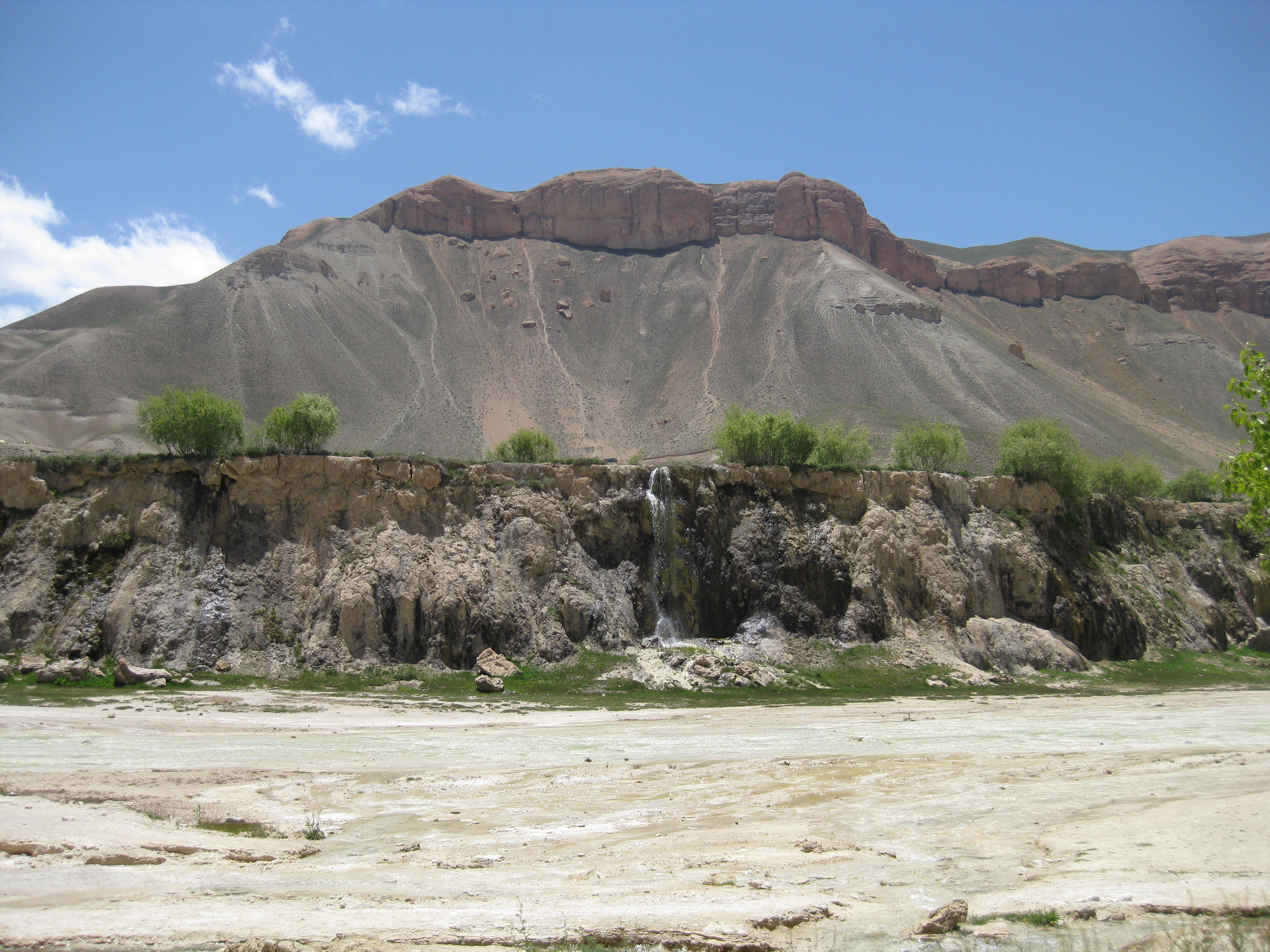

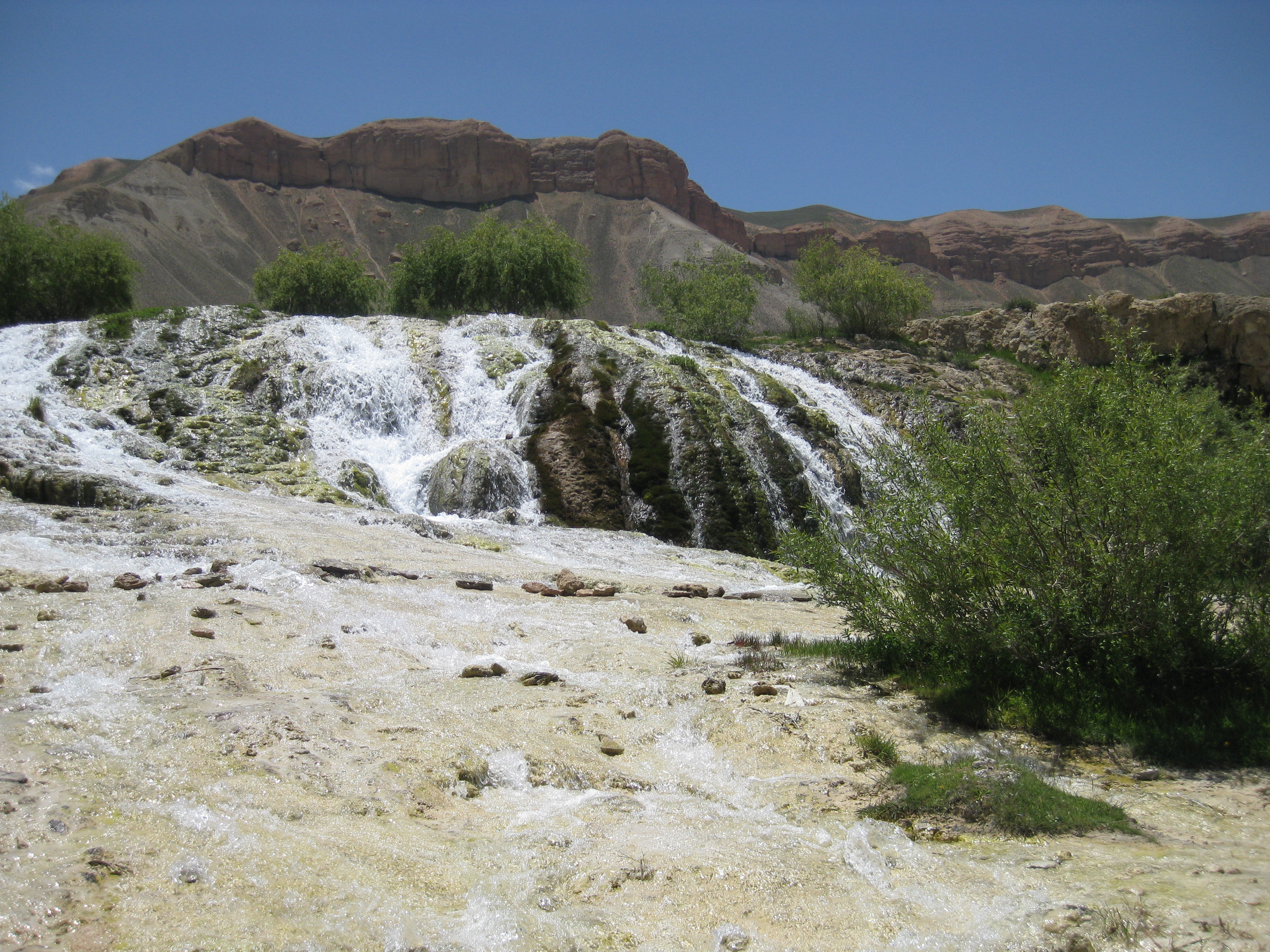

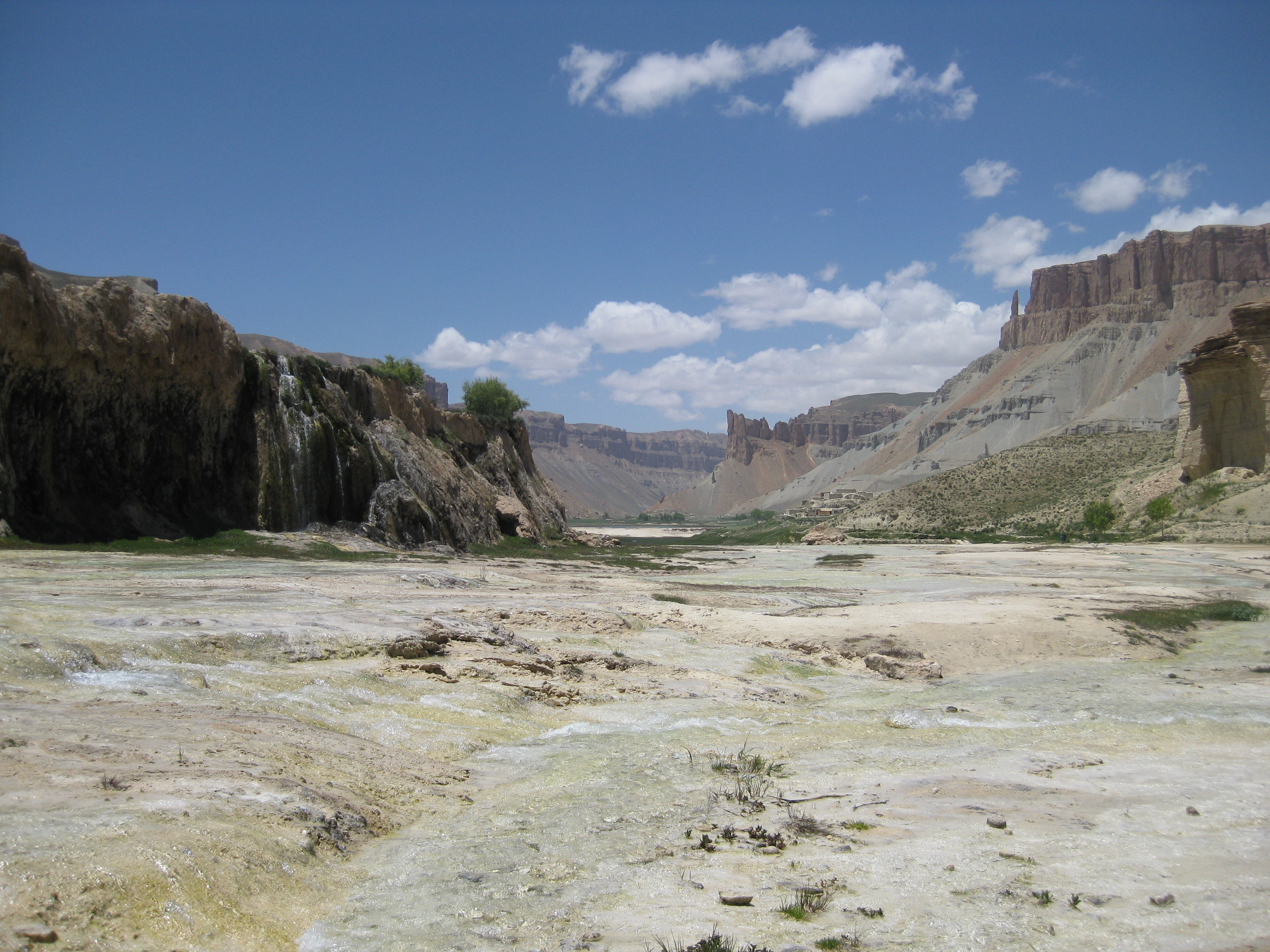

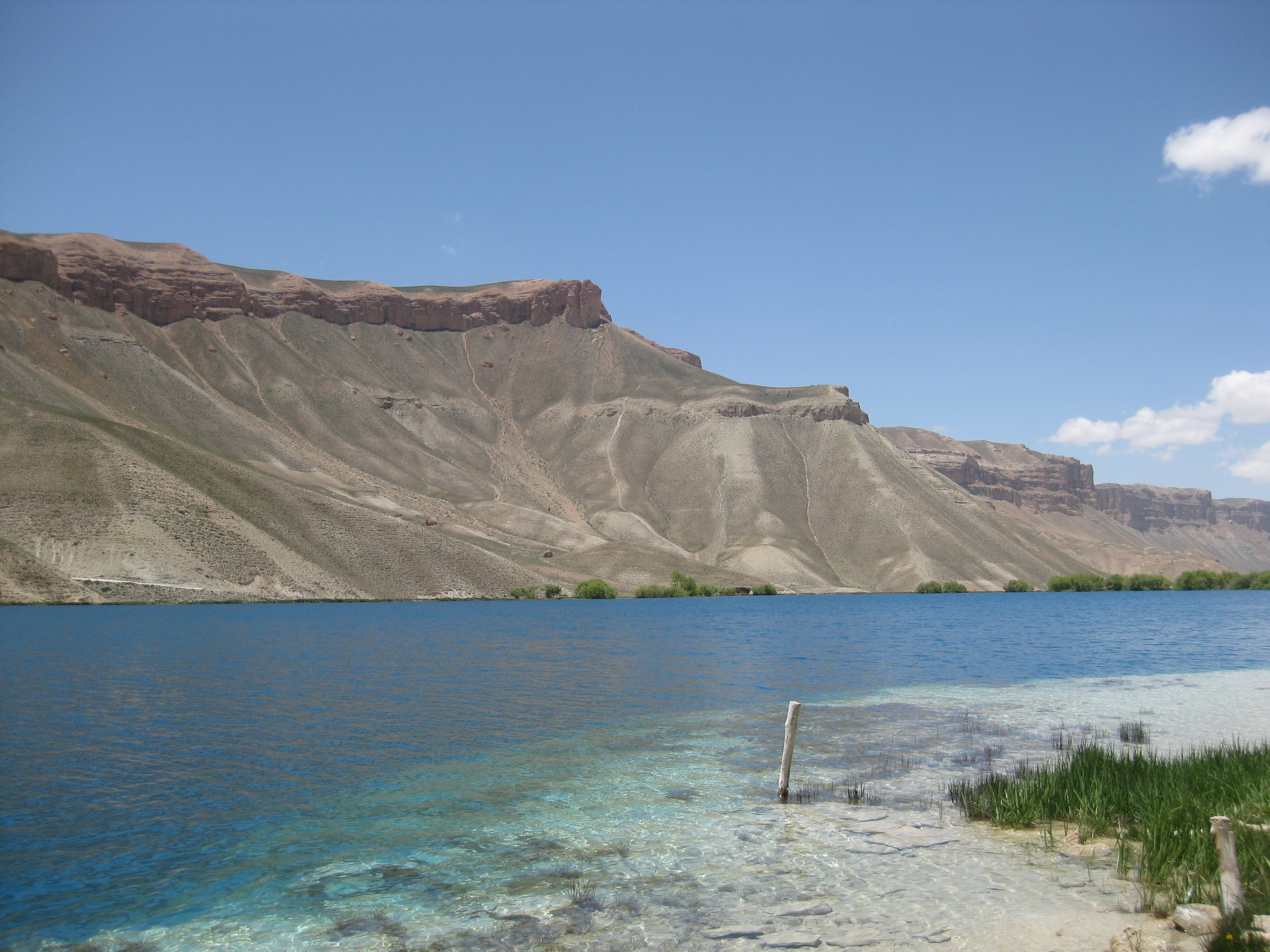

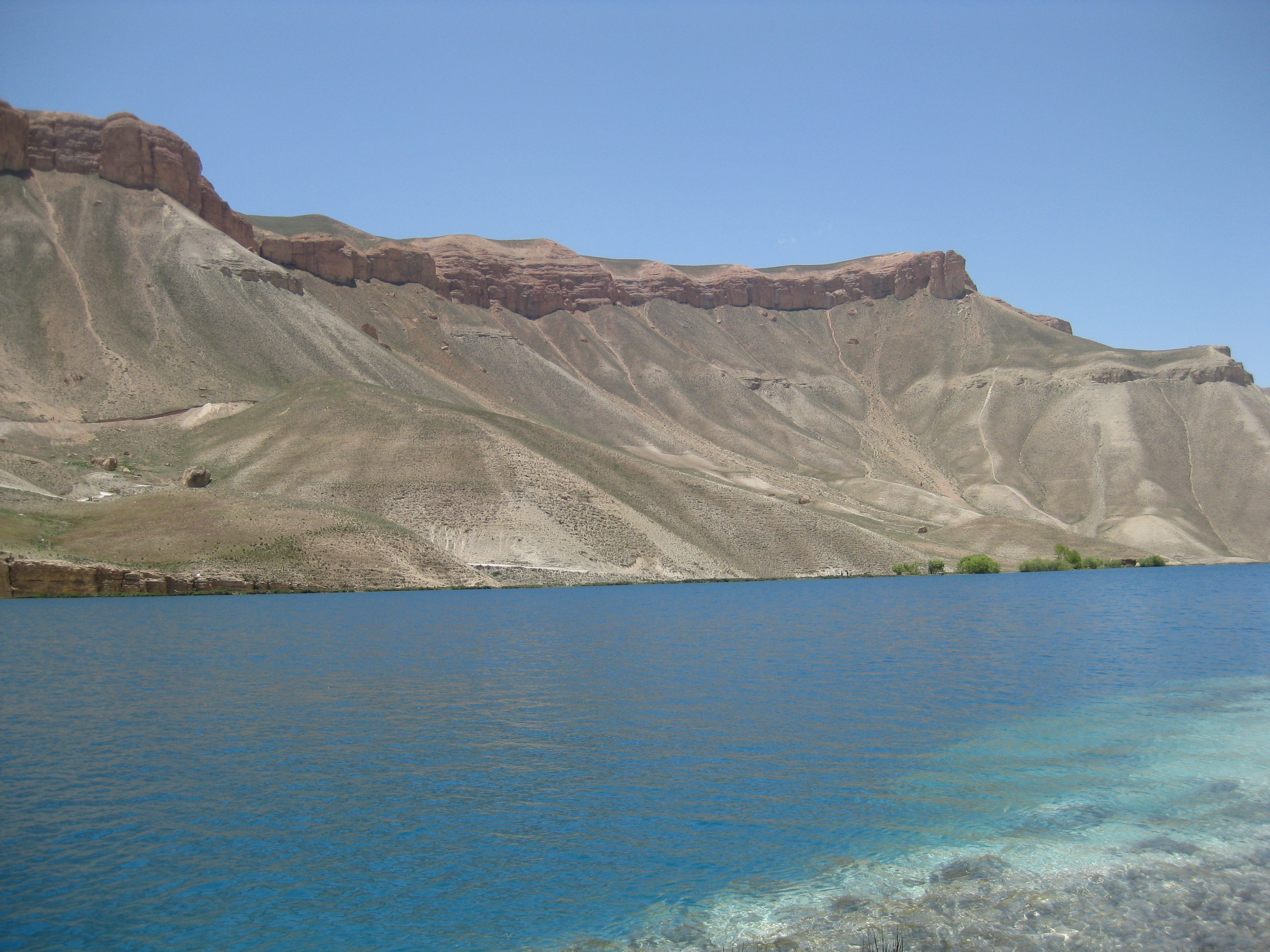

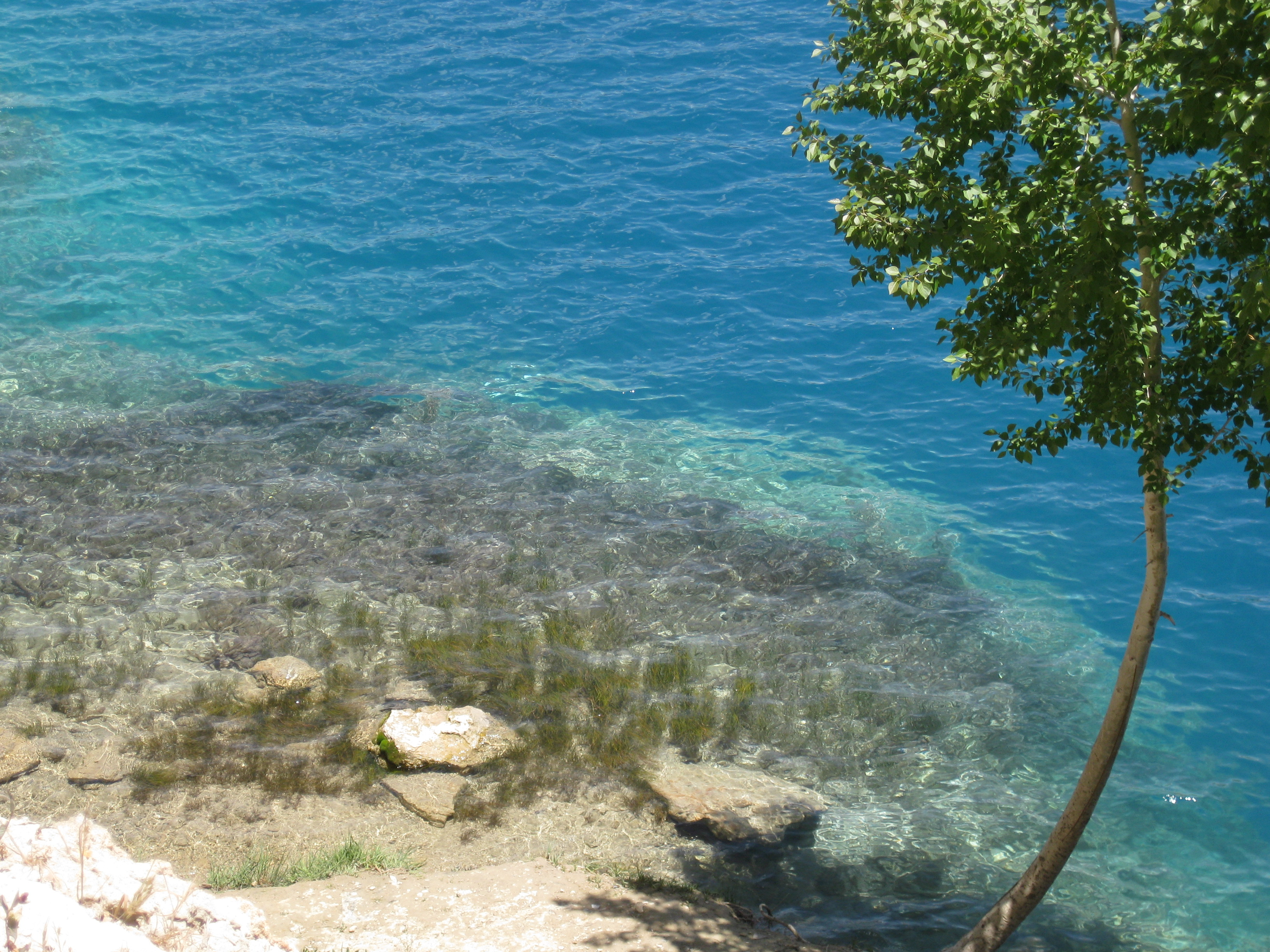

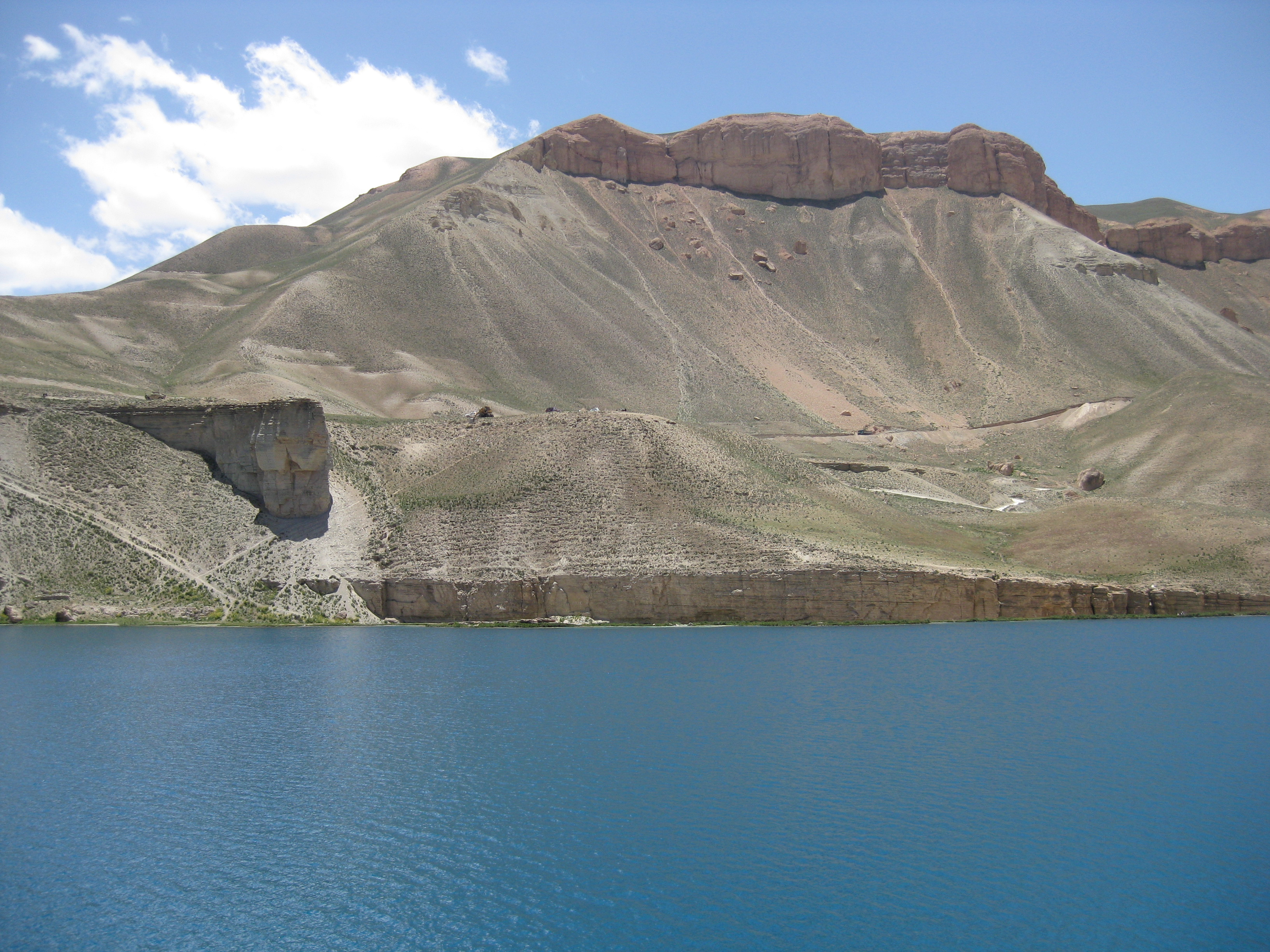

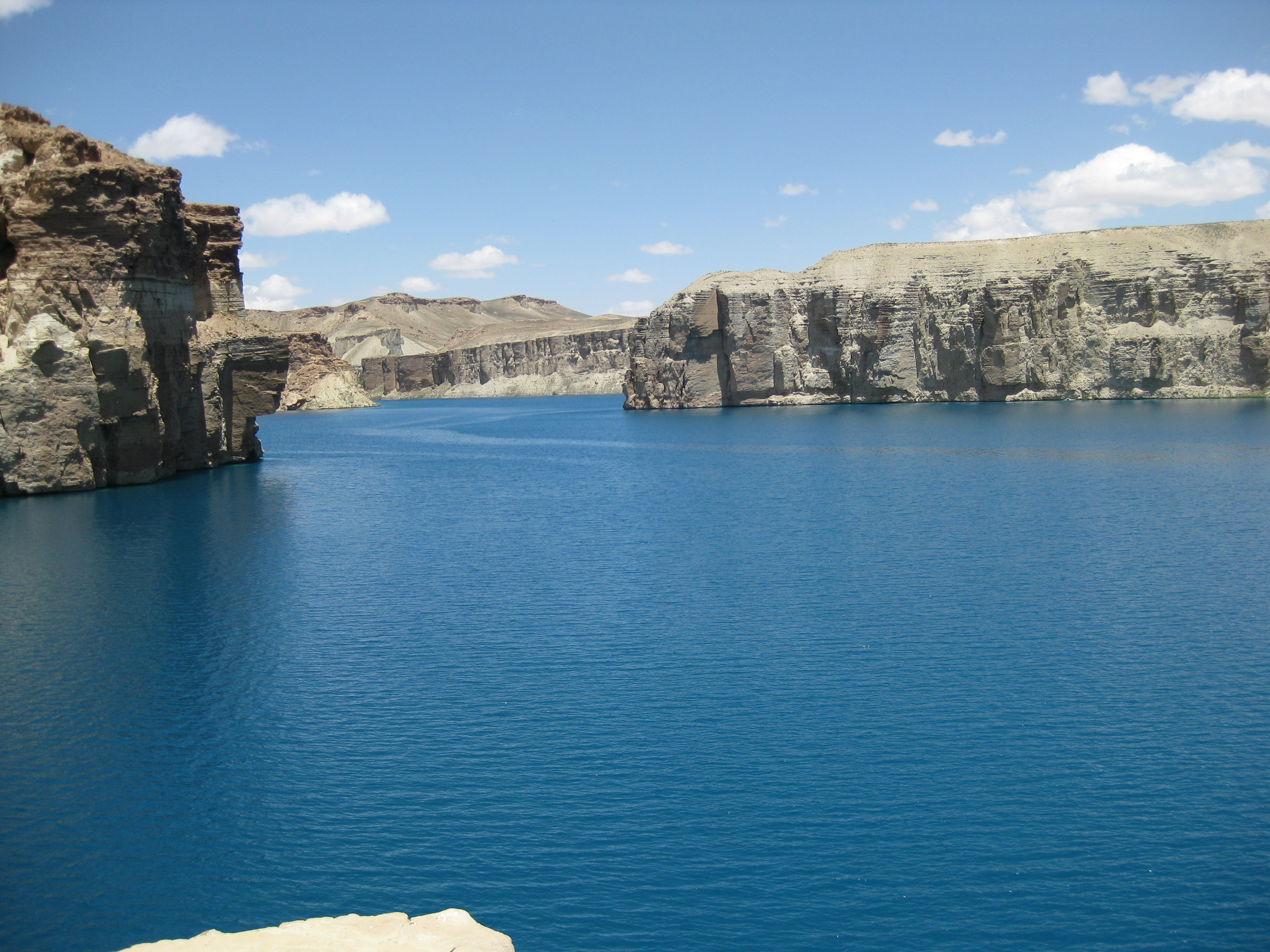

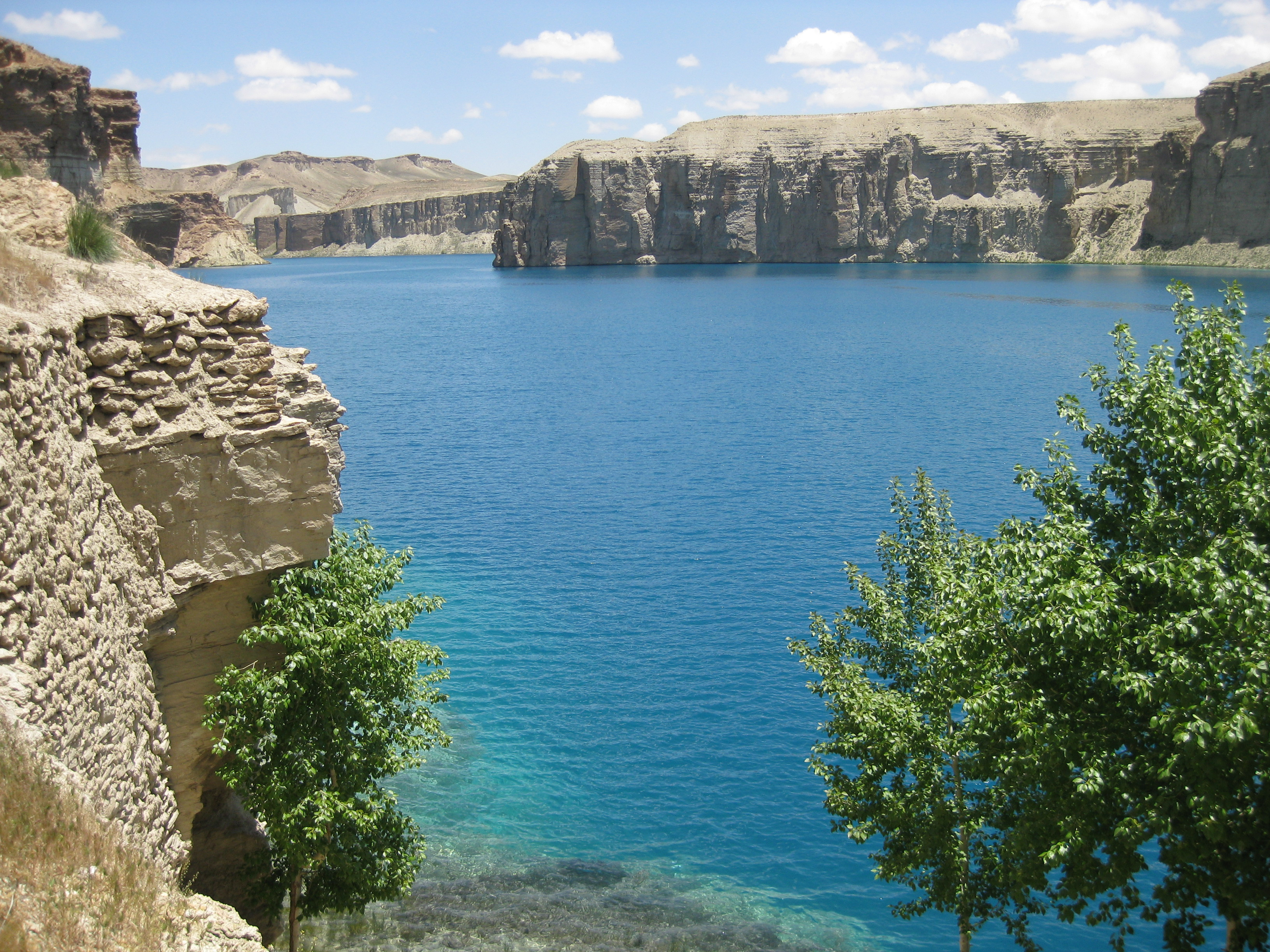
The Band-e Amir Lake

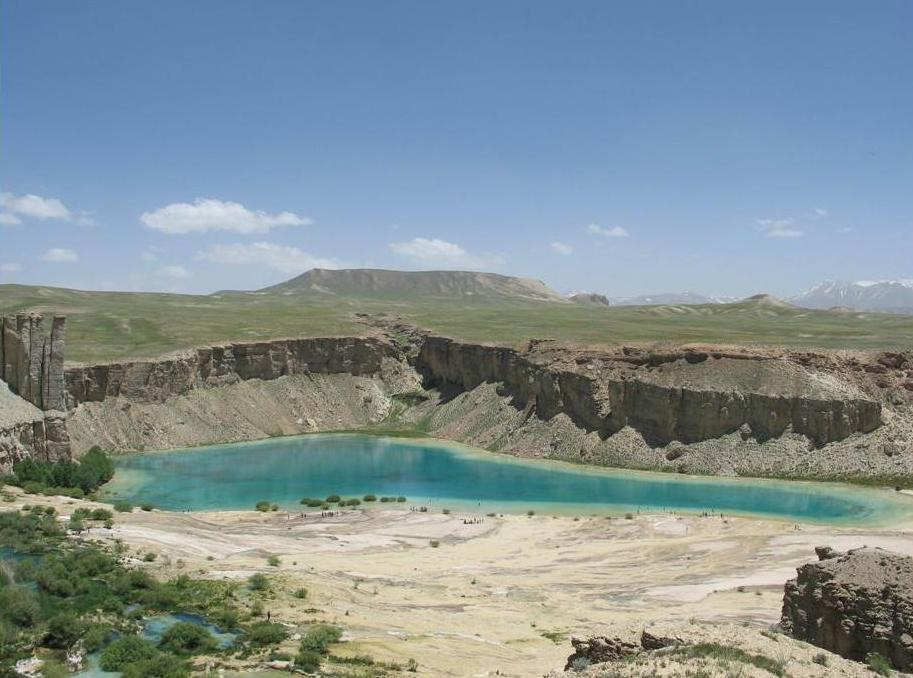
One of the Lakes at Band-e Amir Area

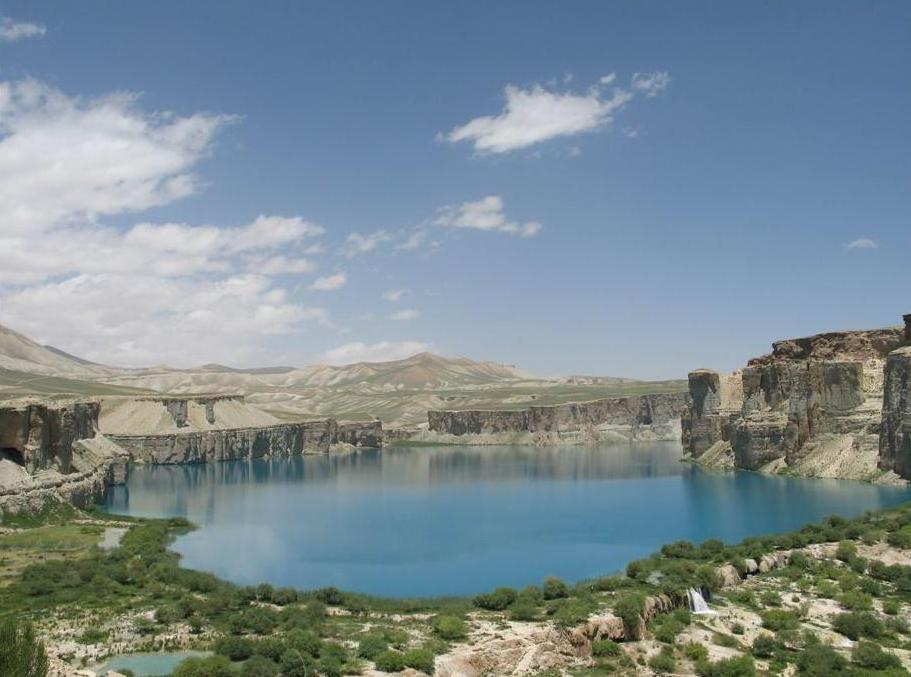
Another Lake at Band-e Amir Area

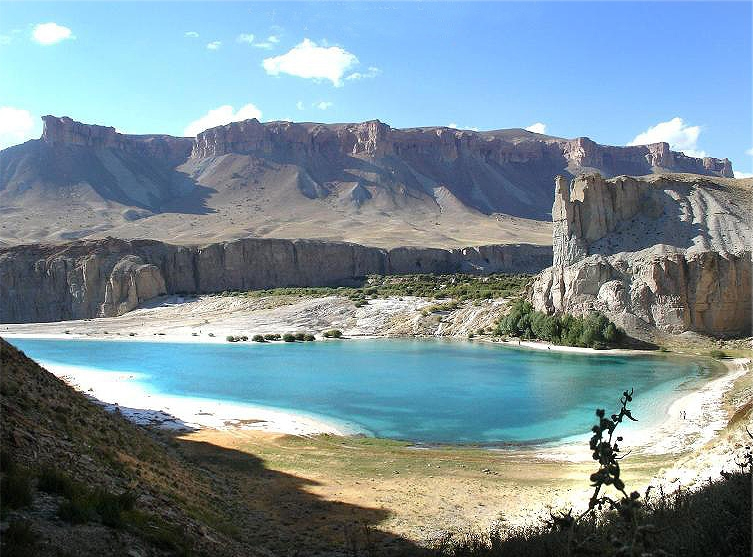
Band-e Panir

== Current status ==
The entrance and checkpoint of the Band-e Amir National Park, Afghanistan

After the formal establishment of the park in 2009, a park office with a park warden and a group of rangers was installed to manage the conservation and protection of the park's natural resources. The WCS is the only non-government organization with an office in the park. The WCS supports park staff and works with the local community to promote conservation and sustainable use of natural resources. Ecotourism is expected to decrease local economic dependency on the park's natural resources. Tourists visit Band-e-Amir primarily in the summer months when the weather is warm. A poor local economy and limited outside investment have hampered efforts to attract winter tourism.

The local people in Band-e-Amir National Park rely heavily on the park's natural resources for their livelihood. Grazing of livestock, collection of shrubs for fuel and winter fodder and rain-fed farming is still widely practiced within the park boundary. Although the illegal hunting of birds and a few mammals living in the park is formally prohibited by the park office, there is no current data to evaluate the status of wildlife and biodiversity.

In August 2023, the Taliban banned women from entering the park, with the acting Minister of Virtue and Vice, Mohammad Khaled Hanafi, alleging that women had not been observing hijab inside the park. Hanafi called on religious clerics and security agencies to forbid women from entering until a solution was found.

=== Important bird area ===
A 41,000 ha (100,000 acres) tract overlapping the national park has been designated an Important Bird Area (IBA) by BirdLife International because it supports populations of Himalayan snowcocks, Hume's larks, white-winged snowfinches, Afghan snowfinches and Eurasian crimson-winged finches. It was reported that there are over 170 bird species in the park.

== See also ==
- List of dams and reservoirs in Afghanistan
- Natural areas of Afghanistan
- Wakhan National Park
- Nuristan National Park

== Bibliography ==
- Dupree, Nancy Hatch (1977): An Historical Guide to Afghanistan. 1st Edition: 1970. 2nd Edition. Revised and Enlarged. Afghan Tourist Organization.
