= Safdar Tawakoli =

Safdar Tawakoli صفدر توکلی
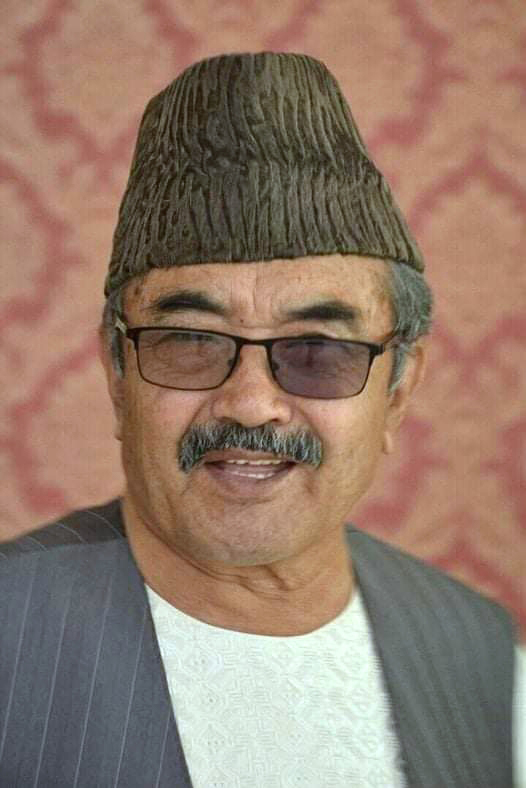
- Tawakoli in 2022

Background information
- Born: Safdar; 1942 (age 82–83); Yakawlang, Bamyan, Kingdom of Afghanistan
- Genres: Folkloric
- Instrument: Dambora

Safdar Tawakoli (Dari: صفدر توکلی; born 1942) is an ethnic Hazara musician from Afghanistan. He focuses on and plays mostly Hazara folkloric and regional traditional music based on the dambura. He was born in Yakawlang, Bamyan Province. In 2020, the Afghan government awarded him the title of "Sultan Dambura" for his unique musical style.

== Early life ==
Safdar Tawakoli was born in 1942, in Yakawlang, Bamyan, Afghanistan, to a family of moderate means. His interest in music was nurtured during his youth, but he had to overcome the conservative tradition and religious restrictions of his local culture. Despite these, he pursued his field of interest and became a devoted artist. He always admired and in some cases envied the popularity of national singers. He mastered the dambura, a regional long-necked stringed instrument popular among the Hazaras of central Afghanistan.

== Career ==
In pursuit of a career in music, he left Bamyan to run a music store in Kabul that sold cassettes. It was his hard work and talent that led him to the studios of Radio Kabul and Afghanistan's National Television, where he did many shows and sung hundreds of songs. Safdar Tawakuli became a household name in some regions and the number of his listeners increased. He became an iconic singer and was awarded with several awards and honorary medals. He has represented Afghan music in numerous international shows.

He headed the musical group of the Ministry of Cultural Affairs of Afghanistan from 1986 to 1995, for eleven consecutive years.

Like everything else, Safdar Tawakoli's artistry fell victim to the civil war during which he lost his career, his home, his beloved son—but he never lost his fame.

Tawakoli remained in Afghanistan during the Taliban period as a representative of his culture. After the fall of the Taliban, his musical number "Agar az Bamiyan o Qandahari - Hamay mo Pag biraari" became a symbol of national unity and pride for Afghanistan when it was re-sung by the prominent Afghan singer Farhad Darya. He was one of the first singers to sing on Afghanistan's National Radio immediately after the fall of the Taliban.

In 2017, the first-ever dambura music festival was held in Bamyan to honor Tawakoli's 50 years as a performer. A statue of Tawakoli was unveiled.
