= Aminullah Zubair =

Governor of Daykundi Province

Aminullah Zubair Haji Obaid
- امین الله زبیر

Governor of Daykundi
- Incumbent
- Assumed office 15 August 2021
- Prime Minister: Hasan Akhund
- Emir: Hibatullah Akhundzada
- Preceded by: Murad Ali Murad

Personal details
- Born: Farah province, Afghanistan

Aminullah Zubair (Pashto: امین الله زبیر), also known as Haji Obaid, is an Afghan Taliban politician, who is currently serving as governor of Daykundi province since August 2021.
