= Ahmad Shah Din Dost =

Governor of Ghor province

Maulvi Ahmad Shah Din Dost
- Pashto: مولوی احمد شاه دین دوست

Governor of Ghor
- In office November 2021 – Unknown
- Prime Minister: Hasan Akhund
- Emir: Hibatullah Akhundzada

Maulvi Ahmad Shah Din Dost (Pashto: مولوی احمد شاه دین دوست) is an Afghan Taliban politician and commander who is currently serving as Governor of Ghor province since November 2021.
