= Abdul Qadir Alam =

Afghan politician

Governor of Ghor Province
- In office 2004 – 2005
- Preceded by: Ibrahim Malikzada
- Succeeded by: Shah Abdul Ahad Afzali

Abdul Qadir Alam was the governor of Ghor Province in Afghanistan from 2004 to 2005. He was the second governor of the province after the fall of the Taliban.

== See also ==
- List of governors of Ghor

Preceded by Ibrahim Malikzada	Governor of Ghor; 2004–2005	Succeeded by Shah Abdul Ahad Afzali
