= List of governors of Daykundi =

This is a list of the governors of the province of Daikundi, Afghanistan.

== Governors of Daikundi Province ==
Governor	Period	Extra	Note
Sarwar Danish	28 March 2004; 22 December 2004		
Abdul Hai Neamati	22 December 2004 ???		
Mohammad Yousef	??? ???		
Asadullah Falah	??? ???		
Ezatullah Wassefi	5 May 2005; 6 May 2005		
Jan Mohammed Akbari	6 May 2005; 26 July 2006		
Qurban Ali Oruzgani	26 July 2006; 4 May 2013		
Abdul Haq Shafaq	4 May 2013; 4 June 2015		
Masooma Muradi	4 June 2015; July 26, 2017		
Mahmoud Baligh	July 26, 2017; November 22, 2018		
Sayed Anwar Rahmati	November 22, 2018; May 13, 2020		
Muhammad Zia Hamdard	May 13, 2020 July 12, 2021		
Murad Ali Murad	July 13, 2021 August 2021		
Aminullah Zubair	August 2021 Present		

== See also ==
- List of current governors of Afghanistan
