= Shah Abdul Ahad Afzali =

Governor of Ghor Province, Afghanistan

Shah Abdul Ahad Afzali was the Governor of Ghor from 2005 to 2007, being the third governor after the fall of the Taliban government. He was born in Badakhshan city of Daraim in northern Afghanistan and emigrated with many of his companions to neighbouring country Tajikistan in 1994 until 2003. He was very active in Tajikistan and created many schools and other opportunities for Afghan children and youths.

Preceded by Abdul Qadir Alam	Governor of Ghor; 2005–2007	Succeeded by Baz Mohammad Ahmadi
