= Lal wa Sarjangal =

Lal wa Sarjangal La'l Qaryeh-ye La‘l
- Town
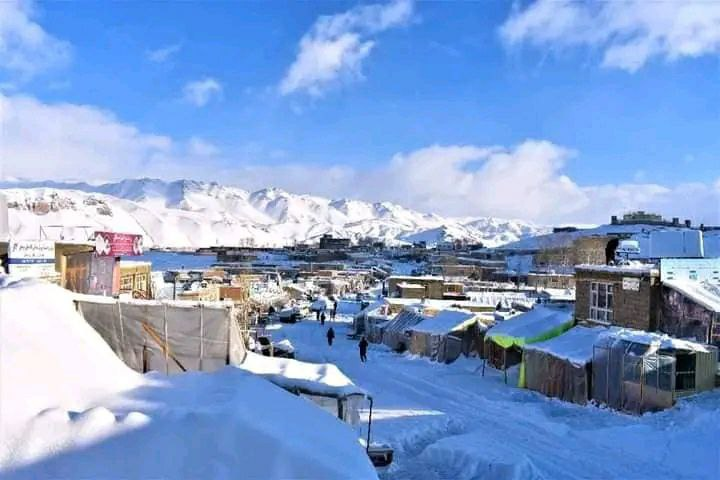
- Lal wa Sarjangal, 2023

- Location in Afghanistan
- Coordinates: 34°30′05″N 66°16′48″E
- Country: Afghanistan
- Province: Ghor
- District: Lal wa Sarjangal
- Elevation: 9,450 ft (2,880 m)
- Time zone: UTC+4:30

Lal (La'l) (Dari: لعل) sometimes called Lal wa Sarjangal (لعل و سرجنگل) is a town and the administrative center of Lal wa Sarjangal District, Ghor province in central Afghanistan.

== Demographics ==
Lal is one of the most populated areas in Ghor province. The people in this area are the Hazara people.

== Geography ==
Lal wa Sarjangal is located within the Hazarajat region in the central highlands of Afghanistan, among the Koh-i Baba mountains and the western extremities of the Hindu Kush. The area is very mountainous.

=== Climate ===
Influenced by its altitude, Lal wa Sarjangal has a boreal climate, defined as a subarctic climate (Dsc) in the Köppen climate classification system. In common with other mountainous region in the province, Lal wa Sarjangal suffers from low rainfall and severe and long winters. The wet season concentrated in winter and spring. Precipitation often falls in the form of snow which is critical for river flow and irrigation in summer.

Climate data for Lal wa Sarjangal, Ghor Province
Month	Jan	Feb	Mar	Apr	May	Jun	Jul	Aug	Sep	Oct	Nov	Dec	Year
Mean daily maximum °C (°F)	−5.4 (22.3)	−2.3 (27.9)	3.5 (38.3)	9.7 (49.5)	16.0 (60.8)	22.3 (72.1)	25.2 (77.4)	24.9 (76.8)	20.7 (69.3)	13.9 (57.0)	6.3 (43.3)	2.3 (36.1)	11.4 (52.6)
Daily mean °C (°F)	−13.4 (7.9)	−9.1 (15.6)	−2.3 (27.9)	4.0 (39.2)	8.5 (47.3)	12.7 (54.9)	15.0 (59.0)	14.2 (57.6)	9.4 (48.9)	5.0 (41.0)	−1.3 (29.7)	−6.3 (20.7)	3.0 (37.5)
Mean daily minimum °C (°F)	−21.4 (−6.5)	−15.9 (3.4)	−8.0 (17.6)	−1.7 (28.9)	0.9 (33.6)	3.0 (37.4)	4.8 (40.6)	3.4 (38.1)	−1.9 (28.6)	−3.9 (25.0)	−8.9 (16.0)	−14.9 (5.2)	−5.4 (22.3)
Average precipitation mm (inches)	24 (0.9)	44 (1.7)	43 (1.7)	68 (2.7)	37 (1.5)	4 (0.2)	0 (0)	0 (0)	0 (0)	16 (0.6)	25 (1.0)	21 (0.8)	282 (11.1)
Source: Levoyageur

== See also ==
- Hazarajat
