= Mohammad Bashir Qant Chah Abi =

Mohammad Bashir Qant Chah Abi محمد بشیر قانت چاه‌آبی
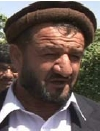

Governor of Sar-e Pol
- In office August 2008 – 25 May 2010
- Preceded by: Wakil Abdullah Khan

Personal details
- Born: Chah Ab

Mohammad Bashir Qant Chah Abi (Dari: محمد بشیر قانت چاه‌آبی) served as the Governor of Sar-e Pol from August 2008 until 25 May 2010.

Bashir is a Hizb-e Islami commander from the Chah Ab district of northern Takhar Province.

Preceded by Mohammad Eqbal Munib	Governor of Sar-e Pol; August 2008 – 25 May 2010	Succeeded by Anwar Rahmati
