= Yakawlang =

City in Bamyan Province, Afghanistan

Yakawlang یکاولنگ
- City
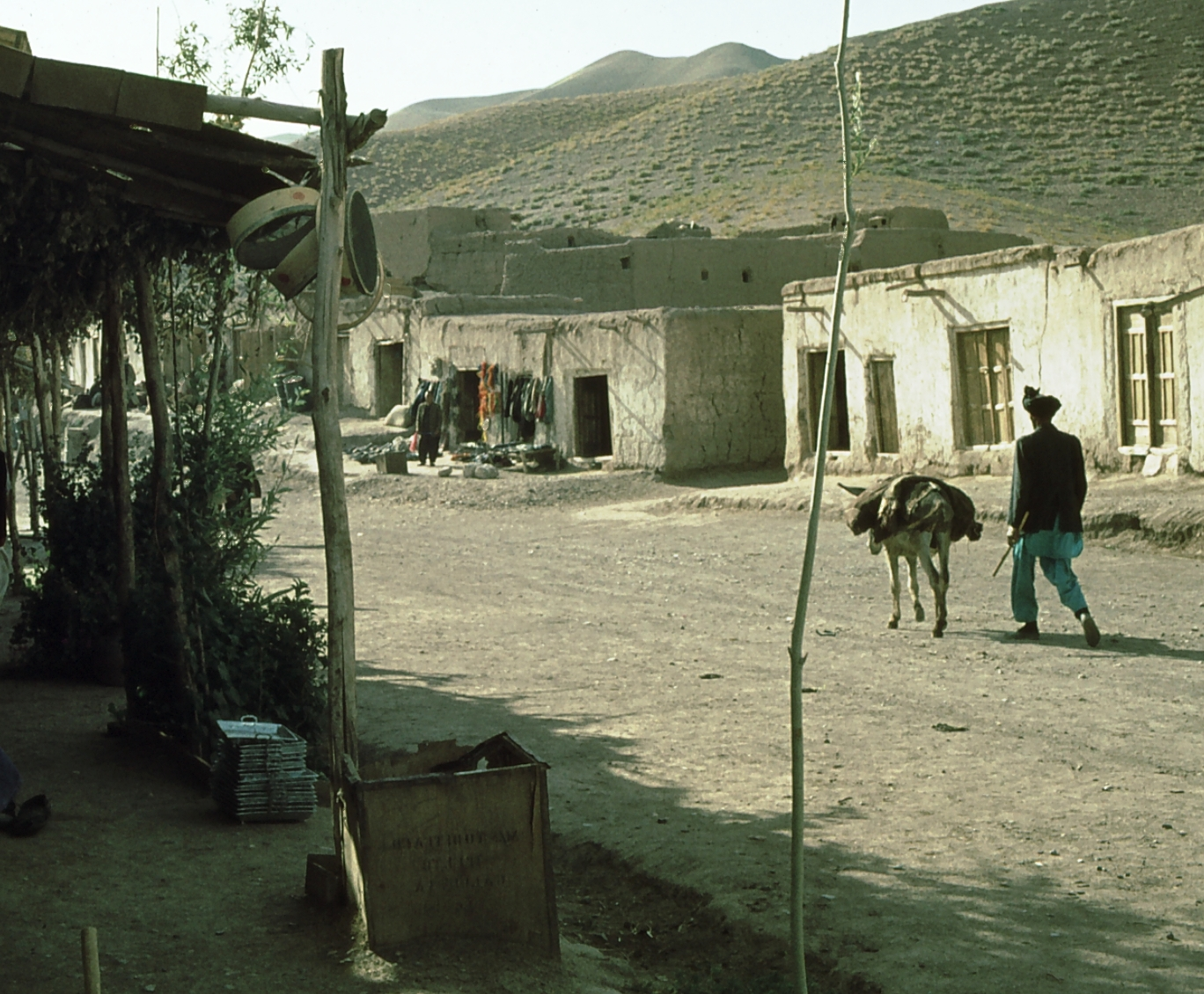

- Location in Afghanistan
- Coordinates: 34°44′N 66°58′E
- Country: Afghanistan
- Province: Bamyan
- District: Yakawlang
- Elevation: 8,481 ft (2,585 m)

Population (2011)
  - Total: 76 000
- Time zone: UTC+4:30

Yakawlang also romanized as Yakaolang (Hazaragi: یکاولنگ) was a city of 76,000 people (est. 2011) in Yakawlang District, Bamyan Province, Afghanistan. It is the capital of Yakawlang District with an altitude of 2,585 metres (8,481.0 ft). It was significantly destroyed by Taliban forces in 2000–2001.

== History ==
Yakawlang was captured from the Taliban by the United Front forces (Hezbe Wahdat and Harakat Islami) on 28 December 2000, but was recaptured by the Taliban in early January 2001. Following its recapture, there were reports of mass arrests and summary executions carried out from 8–12 January 2001. A number of aid agency personnel and a United Nations staff member were among those who were killed.

== Climate ==
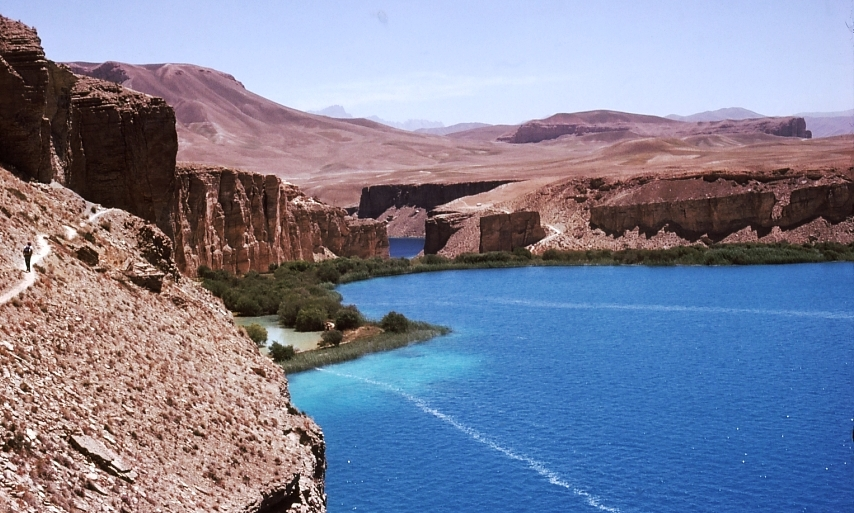
Band-e Amir

Yakawlang experiences a warm-summer humid continental climate (Dsb) under the Köppen climate classification, with warm, dry summers and cold, snowy winters.

Climate data for Yakawlang, Bamyan Province
Month	Jan	Feb	Mar	Apr	May	Jun	Jul	Aug	Sep	Oct	Nov	Dec	Year
Mean daily maximum °C (°F)	−4 (25)	−4 (25)	0 (32)	7 (45)	15 (59)	19 (66)	23 (73)	21 (70)	18 (64)	11 (52)	3 (37)	−2 (28)	9 (48)
Daily mean °C (°F)	−12 (10)	−11 (12)	−6 (21)	3 (37)	10 (50)	14 (57)	17 (63)	16 (61)	12 (54)	7 (45)	−1 (30)	−8 (18)	3 (38)
Mean daily minimum °C (°F)	−19 (−2)	−18 (0)	−12 (10)	−2 (28)	6 (43)	9 (48)	11 (52)	11 (52)	7 (45)	2 (36)	−5 (23)	−14 (7)	−2 (29)
Average precipitation mm (inches)	35 (1.4)	47 (1.9)	39 (1.5)	34 (1.3)	29 (1.1)	6 (0.2)	3 (0.1)	2 (0.1)	2 (0.1)	8 (0.3)	22 (0.9)	10 (0.4)	237 (9.3)
Source: Besttimetovisit

== See also ==
- Yakawlang District
