= Hazara culture =

Culture of the Hazara people

The ethnic Hazara people are native to and primarily inhabit the Hazarajat region of central Afghanistan; they also live in the Balochistan province of Pakistan, and elsewhere around the world where the Hazara diaspora is settled as part of the wider Afghan diaspora.

The culture of the Hazara people (Dari: فرهنگ هزاره; Hazaragi: فرهنگ آزره) is rich in heritage, with many unique cultures and traditions, and shares influences with various Central Asian and South Asian cultures. The Hazarajat region has an ancient history and was, at different periods, home to the Greco-Buddhists, Ghorid, and Ghaznavid civilizations, later the Mongols and the Timurids. Each of these civilizations left visible imprints on the region's local culture.

The Hazaras speak Dari and Hazaragi dialects and varieties of Persian, which is spoken mostly in Afghanistan. The Hazara were traditionally pastoral farmers active in herding in the central and southeastern highlands of Afghanistan. They primarily practice Islam: denominations of Shi'a with significance of Sunni and some Isma'ili.

== Clothing ==
Hazara clothing plays an important and special role in supporting the traditional, cultural and social identity of Hazaras. Hazara clothes are sewn in most parts of the country, especially in the central provinces of the country.

== Cuisine ==
Hazara cuisine is strongly influenced by the Central Asian, South Asian, and Persian cuisines.

== Music ==
=== Dambura ===
Many Hazara musicians are highly skilled in playing the dambura, a local oud instrument found in other Central Asian countries such as Kazakhstan, Uzbekistan, and Tajikistan. Some of the musicians and dambura players are, such as Sarwar Sarkhosh, Dawood Sarkhosh, Safdar Tawakoli, Sayed Anwar Azad, and others.

== Sport ==
=== Buzkashi ===
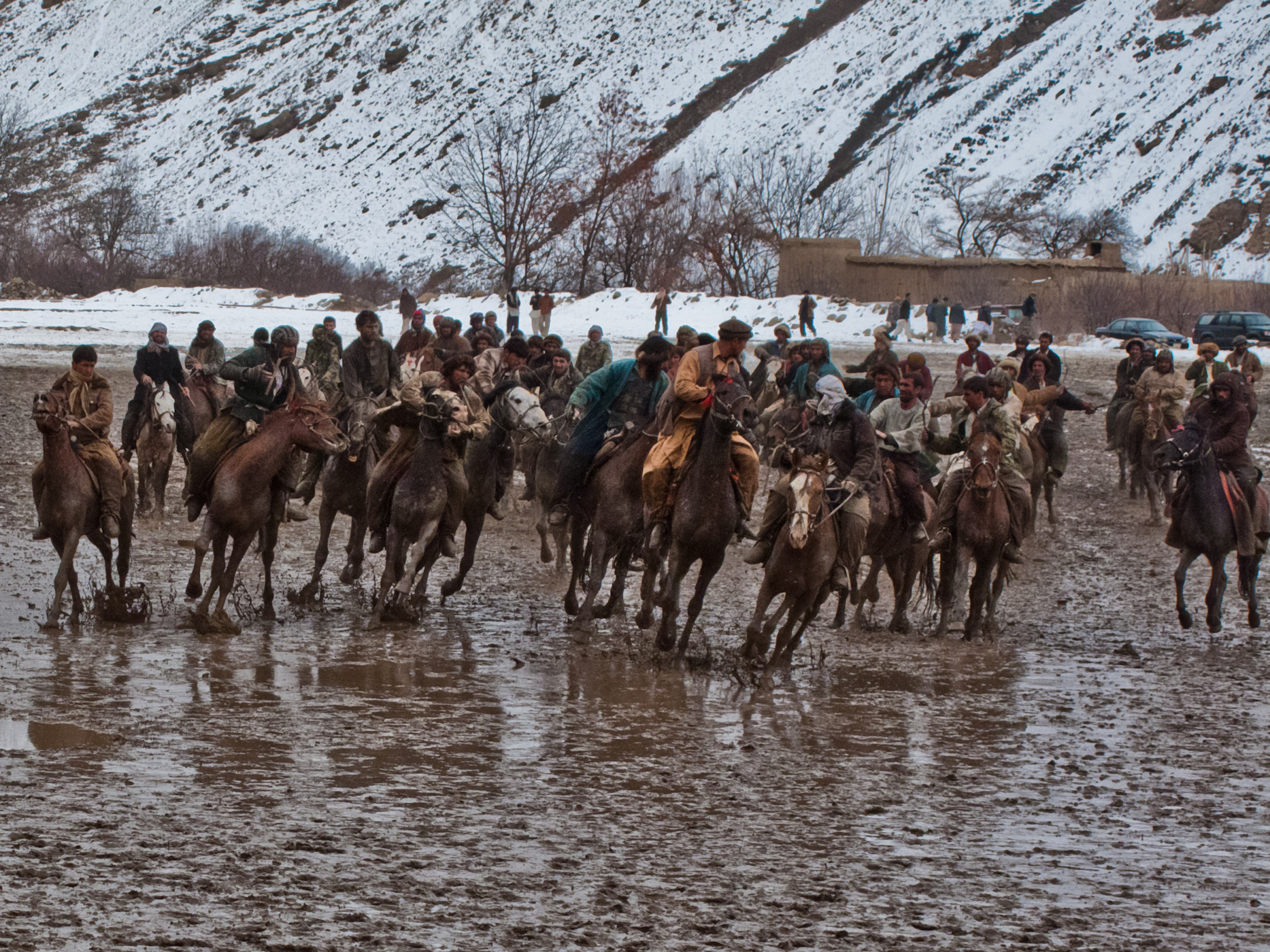
Buzkashi in Afghanistan

Buzkashi is a Central Asian sport in which horse-mounted players attempt to place a goat or calf carcass in a goal. It is the national sport in Afghanistan and is one of the main cultural sports of the Hazara people.

== Games ==
- Tirandazi

== Gallery ==
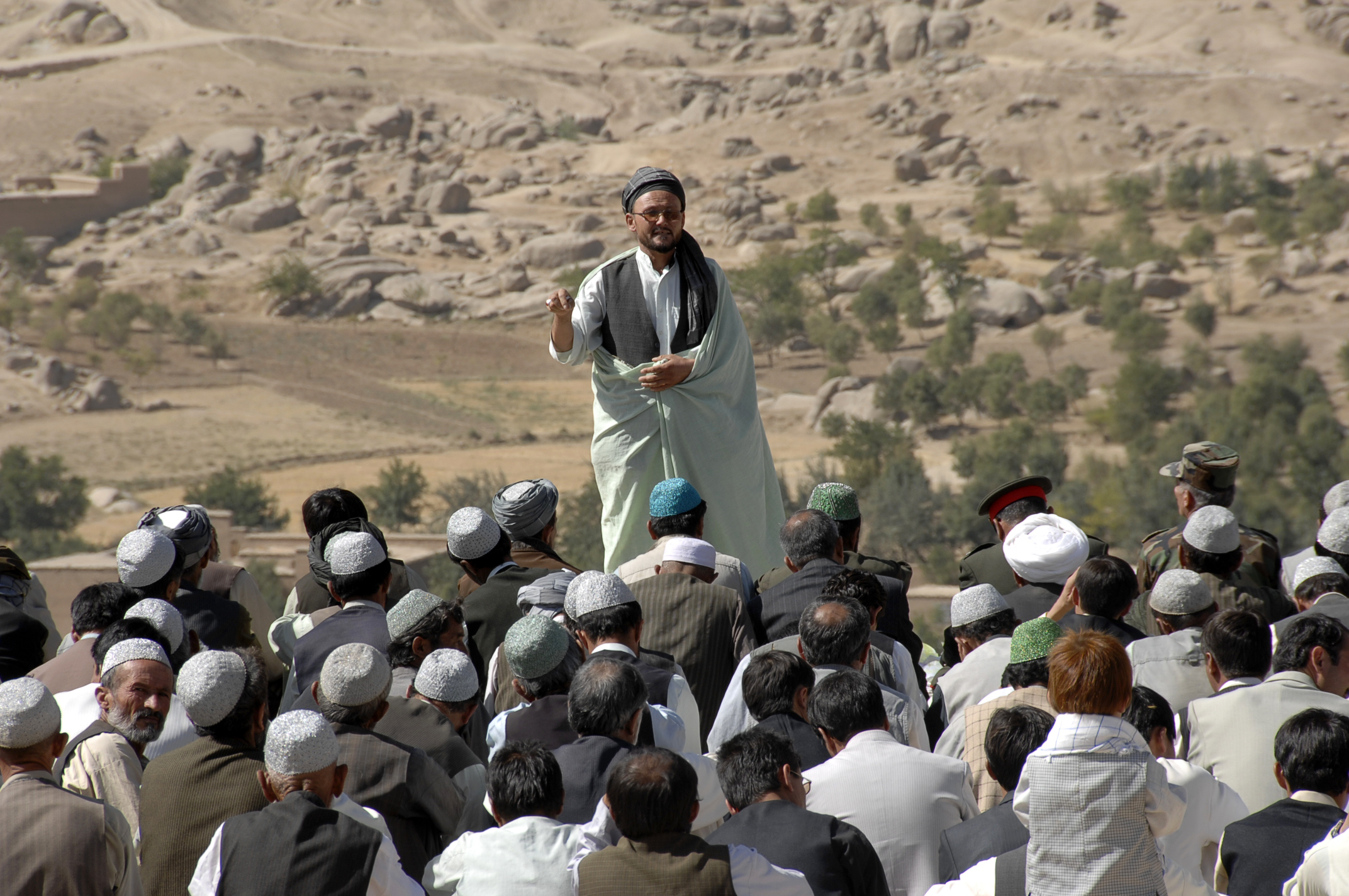
Hazara scouncil in Sept 2009, Daikundi, Afghanistan

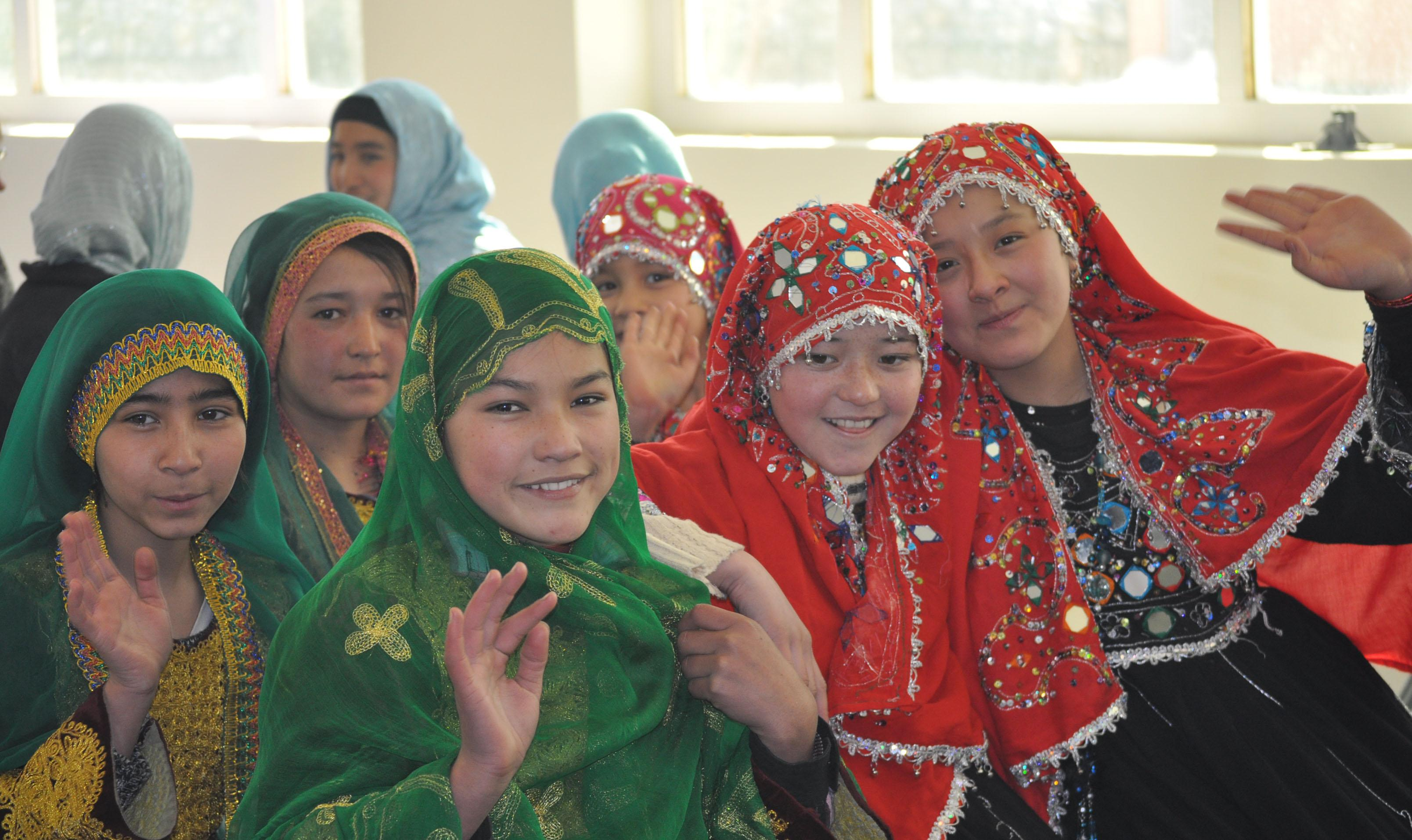
Hazara girls (right) wearing red traditional dress sitting next to Tajik and Pashtun girls in Ghazni, Afghanistan

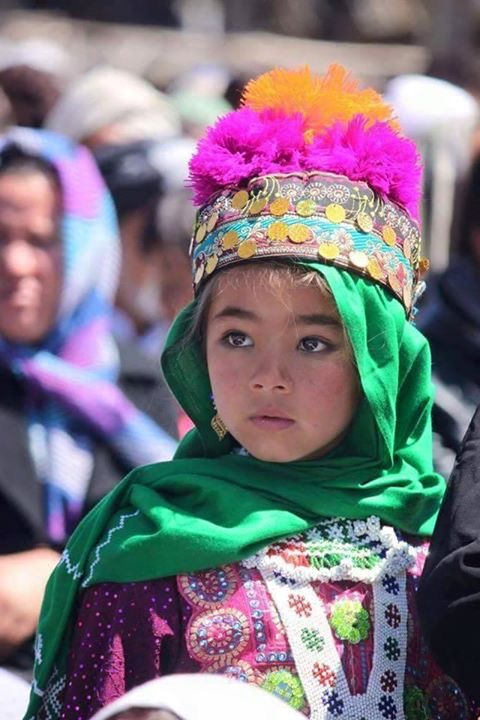
A Hazara girl in traditional Hazara clothing

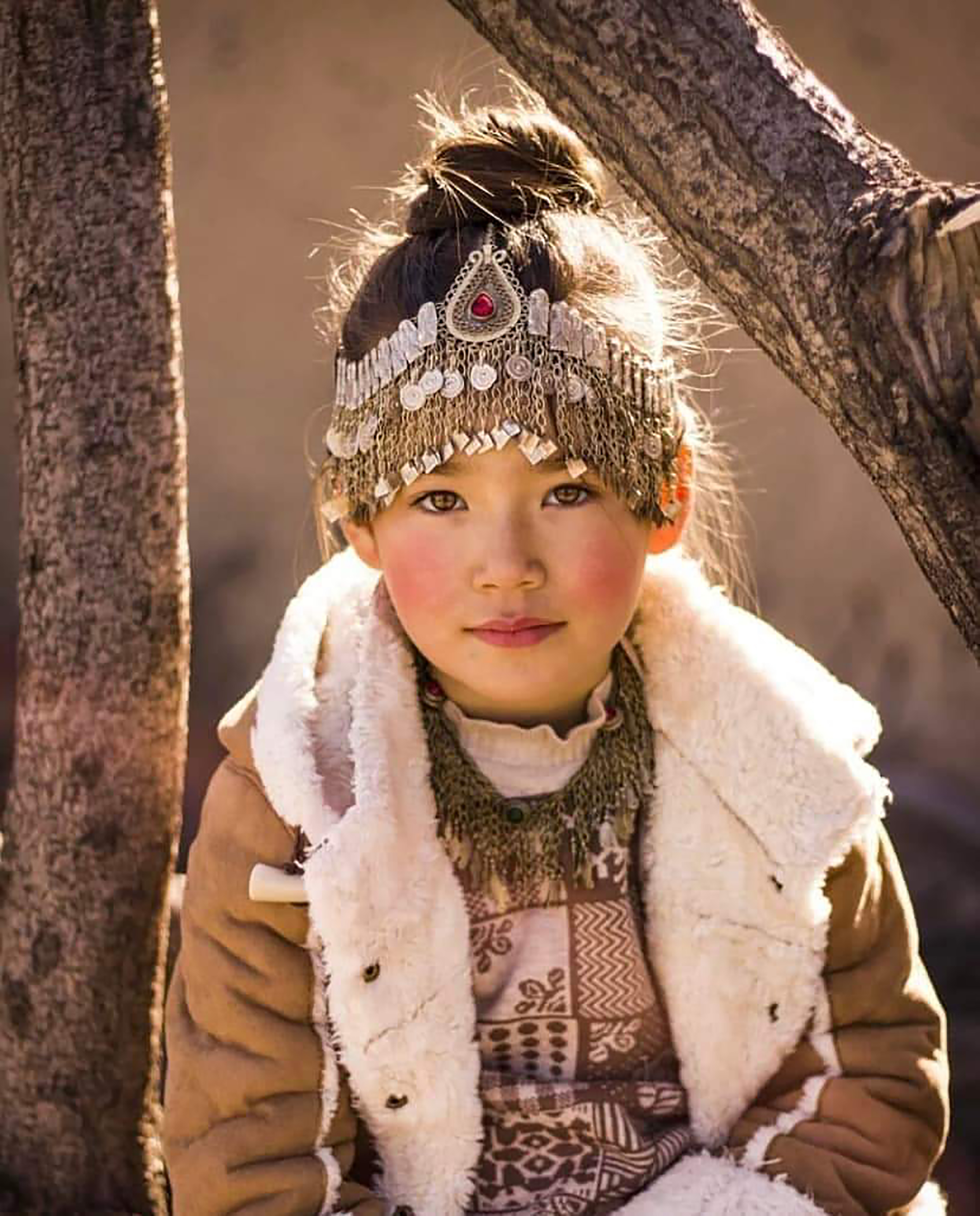
A Hazara girl in traditional Hazara clothing

== See also ==
- Culture of Afghanistan
