= Murad Ali Murad =

Afghan military officer

General Murad Ali Murad مرادعلی مراد
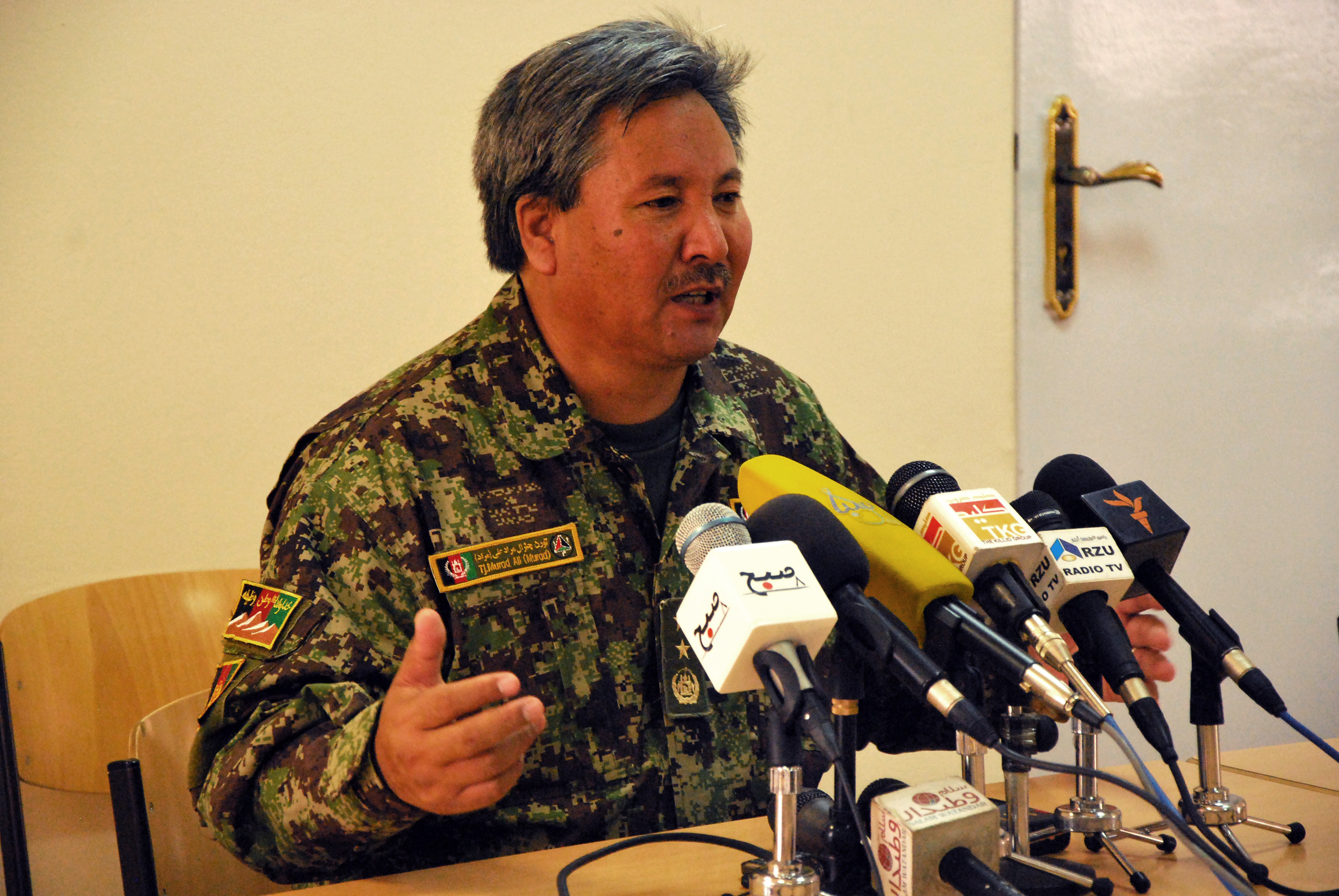
- Murad Ali Murad in 24 June 2010

Deputy Interior Minister for Security
- In office 18 May 2017 – 22 May 2018
- President: Ashraf Ghani

Governor of Daykundi
- In office 13 July 2021 – 15 August 2021
- Preceded by: Muhammad Zia Hamdard
- Succeeded by: Aminullah Zubair

Personal details
- Born: 1960 (age 65–66) La‘l wa Sar Jangal, Ghor Province, Afghanistan

Military service
- Allegiance: Democratic Republic of Afghanistan; Islamic Republic of Afghanistan
- Branch/service: Afghan National Army
- Years of service: 1980s-2020
- Rank: Lieutenant-general
- Unit: Deputy Commander of 203rd Corps; Commander of 209th Corps; Commander of Afghan Ground Forces
- Battles/wars: Soviet–Afghan War; War in Afghanistan

Lt. Gen. Murad Ali Murad (Dari: مرادعلی مراد) is a politician and military personnel in Afghanistan, previously serving as Deputy Interior Minister for Security and Governor of Daykundi.

== Functions ==
Gen. Murad has been responsible for the Afghanistan National Army since the fall of the Taliban regime in 2001 in various parts of the country. He worked as Deputy Chief of Army Staff Afghanistan of the Afghan National Army, appointed to this command since 2015 after succeeding General Sher Mohammad Karimi. He was dismissed on 22 May 2018. Murad then briefly served as the commander of the Kabul garrison. He was appointed as governor of Daykundi Province on 13 July 2021.

- Deputy Commander of 203rd Corps (Afghanistan) (2006–2007)
- Commander 209th Corps (Afghanistan) (2007–2010)
- Commander of Afghan Ground Forces (2010–2015)
- Deputy chief of staff of the Afghan National Army (ANA) (2015–2018)
- Deputy interior minister for security (18 May 2017)
