= Jafar Mahdavi =

Afghan politician (born 1978)

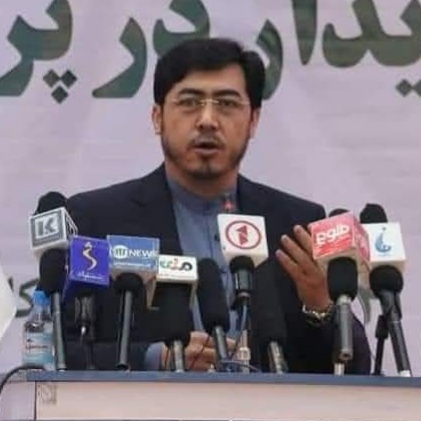

Afghanistan Parliament

Personal details
- Born: 1978 (age 47–48) Lal wa Sarjangal, Ghor, Afghanistan
- Occupation: Politician
- Ethnicity: Hazara

Jafar Mahdavi (Dari: جعفر مهدوی) is an Afghan politician. He was the representative of Kabul province during the 16th term of Afghanistan Parliament in 2010 and a member of the Enlightenment Movement of Afghanistan.

== Early life and education ==
Jafar Mahdavi was born in 1978 in Lal wa Sarjangal, Ghor, Afghanistan. He completed his university education up to his doctorate in sociology from University of Tehran in Tehran, Iran in 2005.
