= List of governors of Ghor =

This is a list of the governors of the province of Ghor, Afghanistan.

== Governors of Ghor Province ==
Governor	Period	Extra	Note
Ibrahim Malikzada	2001; 2004		
Abdul Qadir Alam	2004; 2005		
Shah Abdul Ahad Afzali	2005; 2007		
Baz Mohammad Ahmadi	2007; 2009		
Mohammad Eqbal Munib	2009; 2010		
Seema Jowenda	28 June 2015; 7 November 2015		
Ghulam Nasir Khaze	21 December 2015 – ?		
Abul Zahir Faiz Zada	? – ?		
Ahmad Shah Din Dost	November 2021 – ?		
Hayatullah Mubarak	? – present		

== See also ==
- List of current governors of Afghanistan
