= Lal wa Sarjangal District =

La'l wa Sarjangal لعل و سرجنگل
- District
- Location within Afghanistan
- Coordinates: 34°36′10″N 66°16′36″E
- Country: Afghanistan
- Province: Ghor
- Center: La'l
- Elevation: 2,800 m (9,200 ft)

Population (2012)
  - Total: 108,900
- Time zone: UTC+04:30 (Afghanistan Time)

Lal wa Sarjangal (Dari: لعل و سرجنگل) is a district in the northeast of Ghor province in central Afghanistan. The district center is the town of Lal wa Sarjangal. It was reported in 2012 that around 108,900 people resided in the district, majority of which are ethnic Hazaras.

== Notable people ==
- Murad Ali Murad
- Hassan Abdullahi, former Minister of Urban Development
- Nadir Shah Bahr, former Parliamentarian in Afghanistan
- Ruqia Nayel, former Parliamentarian in Afghanistan
- Haidar Ali Etimadi, a member of the Hezbe Wahdat
- Jafar Mahdavi, former Parliamentarian and a member of Afghan Mellat Party

== See also ==
- Districts of Afghanistan
- Hazarajat
