= Qurban Ali Urozgani =

Afghan politician (born 1958)

Qurban Ali Urozgani قربان‌علی اروزگانی
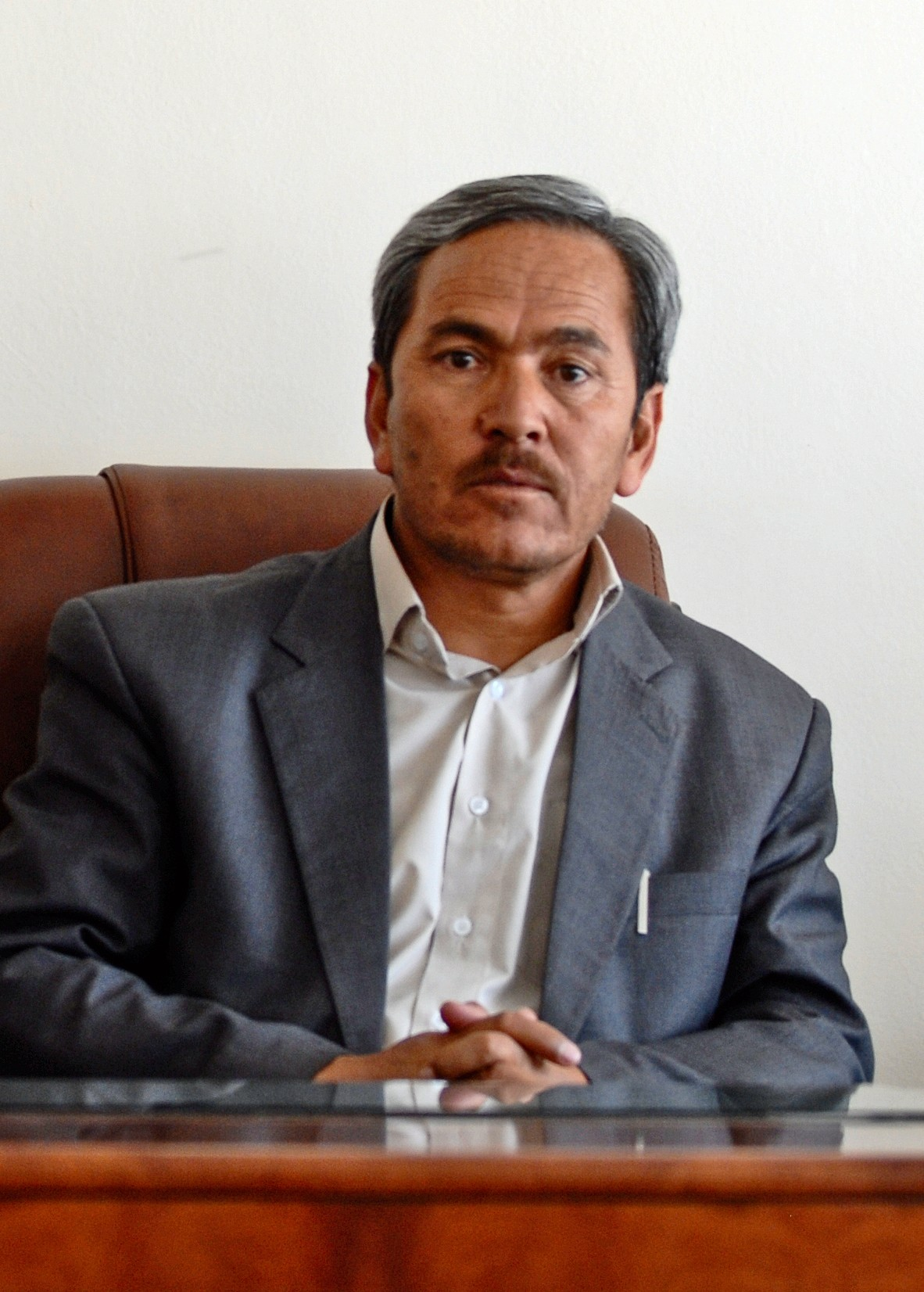
- Qurban Ali Urozgani in 2011

Governor of Daykundi
- In office 2009–2012
- Preceded by: Jan Mohammed Akbari
- Succeeded by: Abdul Haq Shafaq

Personal details
- Born: 21 March 1958 (age 68) Khas Urozgan District, Urozgan, Afghanistan
- Profession: Governor

Qurban Ali Urozgani (Dari: قربان‌علی اروزگانی) was the previous governor of Daykundi Province of Afghanistan. He was selected as governor by President Karzai in April 2010. He belongs to Hazara ethnic of Afghanistan.

== Early life ==
Urozgani was born on 21 March 1958 in Khas Urozgan District of Urozgan Province. His father, Mirza Muhammad Essa, was a government employee in Helmand Province. Urozgani graduated from Technical Agriculture High School in 1979. During the university life, he started participating in anti-Soviet political parties, for which he had to quit education.

== Political career ==
After the September 11 attacks, on the establishment of new government in Afghanistan, Urozgani was nominated as one of the people's Representative of Helmand province. In 2009, Urozgani was selected as the new governor of Daykundi Province after Jan Mohammad Akbari until 2012.

== See also ==
- List of Hazara people

== Notes ==
Preceded by Jan Mohammed Akbari	Governor of Daykundi, Afghanistan; 15 April 2010 – present	Succeeded by [Incumbent]
