= Yakawlang District =

Yakawlang یکاولنگ
- District
- Location within Afghanistan
- Coordinates: 34°58′48″N 66°57′00″E
- Country: Afghanistan
- Province: Bamyan
- Capital: Yakawlang
- Elevation: 2,714 m (8,904 ft)

Population (2011)
  - Total: 76,897

Yakawlang (Hazaragi: یکاولنگ) is district located in the northwestern part of Bamyan Province. Its population is 76,897 (2011) predominantly from the Hazara and Sadat/ Sayed ethnic group. The capital city Yakawlang (altitude 2714m) formerly held 60,000 residents, and it was destroyed by Taliban forces in 2001. Massacres of civilians by the Taliban were reported by Human Rights groups.
There is a gravel surfaced airport near the city.

The road between the provincial capital Bamyan city and Yakawlang district was asphalted in October 2012, reducing the four-hour distance to 80 minutes. The 98-kilometre road cost $70 million (3.6 billion Afghanis), the Asian Development Bank and Japan jointly funded project, and was implemented by a Korean road construction company in a period of four years.

== See also ==
- Yakawlang
- Districts of Afghanistan
- Bamyan Province
