= Arsala Jamal =

Afghan politician

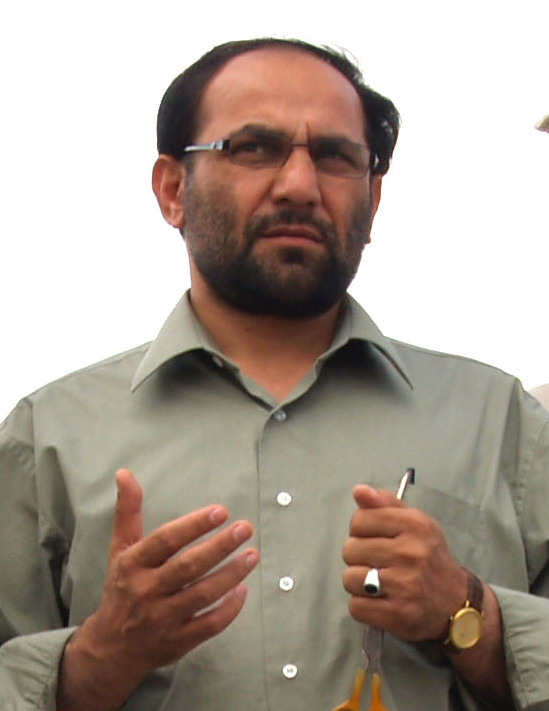

Governor of Logar Province
- In office 17 April 2013 – 15 October 2013
- Preceded by: Mohammad Iqbal Azizi
- Succeeded by: Mohammad Halim Fidai

Governor of Khost, Afghanistan
- In office August 2006 – 2008
- Succeeded by: Hamidullah Qalandarzai

Personal details
- Born: 1966 Yusufkhel District, Paktika Province, Kingdom of Afghanistan
- Died: 15 October 2013 (aged 48) Pol-e Alam, Islamic Republic of Afghanistan
- Manner of death: Assassination

Arsala Jamal (1966 – 15 October 2013) (also anglicised as Arsallah Jamal) was an Afghan government official, who served as governor of the provinces of Khost and Logar in Afghanistan. He was assassinated in a bomb attack in Logar province of Afghanistan on 15 October 2013.

== Early life and education ==
Jamal was born in Paktika Province in 1966. He received his early education in Kabul, Afghanistan. After finishing 12th grade, Jamal went to Malaysia for his higher studies.

== Career ==
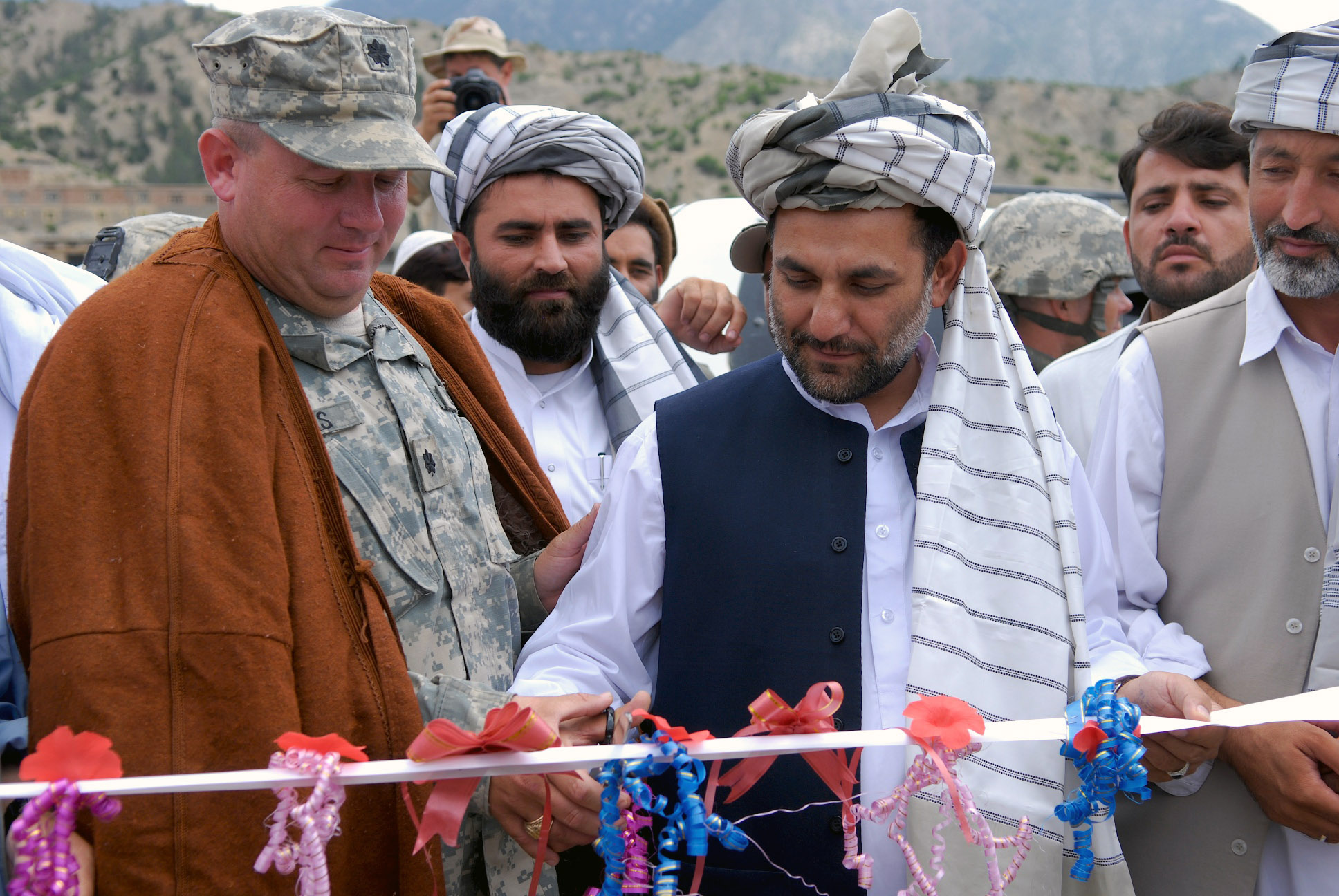
Jamal (centre right) inaugurates a school in Khost province in 2007

Jamal was appointed the vice president of the Da Afghanistan Bank (National Bank of Afghanistan) in 1992, Later he worked with the United Nations mission for Afghanistan based in Peshawar Pakistan. After the Taliban rule ended, he returned to Kabul and worked in rural development, in both the NGO and government sectors. The NGOs he worked for include CARE International and the Central Bank. He served as the water and sanitation programme coordinator and emergency response coordinator for the Ministry of Rural Reconstruction and Development.

In August 2006, Jamal was appointed the provincial governor of Khost Province, in eastern Afghanistan. Khost lies adjacent to the Waziristan tribal region of Pakistan, base to militant groups. After leaving this post, Jamal worked on President Hamid Karzai's successful re-election campaign in 2009, acting as his campaign manager. He was nominated as minister for Border Affairs and Tribal Affairs and functioned as the acting minister, but failed to be confirmed by parliament. After a period abroad in Canada (where he also held citizenship), Jamal was appointed the governor of Logar Province in April 2013, a position he held until his death. Logar is a strategically important province that lies immediately south of the capital, Kabul, and includes a major copper mine at Aynak. One of Jamal's priorities as governor was overseeing the mine's development.

Jamal was described by the BBC as "an active and competent politician with experience of dealing with tribal elders and foreign donors." He was considered a close associate of President Karzai.

== Death ==
Jamal was assassinated on October 15, 2013, in a bomb attack. He was 47. The date is the first day of Eid-al-Adha, a major Muslim festival. Jamal was delivering a speech after an Eid prayer in Logar Province's main mosque in the provincial capital of Pul-i-Alam when the bomb went off. Jamal was killed instantly. Initial reports stated that the bombing was a suicide attack. Subsequent reports are of a remotely activated device, variously stated to have been planted in a microphone or hidden underneath a table or podium. The bomb injured 15–20 others, including the mosque's imam. Five to eight of the injured are reported to be in critical condition. At least one other person is reported to have been killed.

No organisation claimed responsibility for the attack in its immediate aftermath. It is one of the first attacks of 2013 to successfully target a major government official. The motivation for the attack is unknown. The Directorate of Local Governance agency has suggested it might be linked to Jamal's efforts to develop the Aynak copper mine. The capture of Latif Mehsud in Logar earlier in October has also been suggested as a possible motivation.

Jamal had survived several previous assassination attempts, including a 2007 car bomb targeting his convoy, and two attacks in 2009 targeting his Khost office. He is the second governor of Logar to be assassinated; Abdullah Wardak was killed by a roadside bomb in 2008.

He is survived by his wife and six children who live in Canada.
