= List of governors of Wardak =

This is a list of the governors of the province of Wardak, Afghanistan.

== Governors of Wardak Province ==
| Governor | Period | Extra | Note |
|---|---|---|---|
| Muhammad Baqi Yusufzai | 1963; 1966 | under Zahir Shah | |
| Muhammad Ibrahim Abbasi | 1966; 1968 | | |
| Abdul Qadir Qazi | 1968-? | | |
| Shamsuddin Pahlawan | 1996; 2001 | under Mohammed Omar | |
| Abdul Jabbar Naeemi | March 2005; 12 May 2008 | | |
| Mohammad Halim Fidai | 24 July 2008 | | |
| Abdul Majid Khogyani | | | |
| Hayatullah Hayat | June 2015; April 2016 | | |
| Zundi Gul Zamani | 10 May 2016; 17 February 2018 | | |
| Muhammad Arif Shah Jahan | 17 February 2018 ? | | |
| Abdul Yamen Mozafaruddin | ? ? | | |
| Rahimullah Mahmood | August 2021; 7 November 2021 | victorious governor under the Islamic Emirate of Afghanistan | |
| Muhammad Amin Jan | 7 November 2021; 1 September 2025 | under the Islamic Emirate of Afghanistan | |
| Khairullah Khairkhwa | 1 September 2025; Present | under the Islamic Emirate of Afghanistan | |

== See also ==
- List of current governors of Afghanistan

== Notes ==
Bibliography:

- Adamec, Ludwig W. (1975). Historical and Political Who's Who of Afghanistan. Graz: Akademische Druck- u. Verlagsanstalt. ISBN 9783201009218.
