= Mining in Afghanistan =

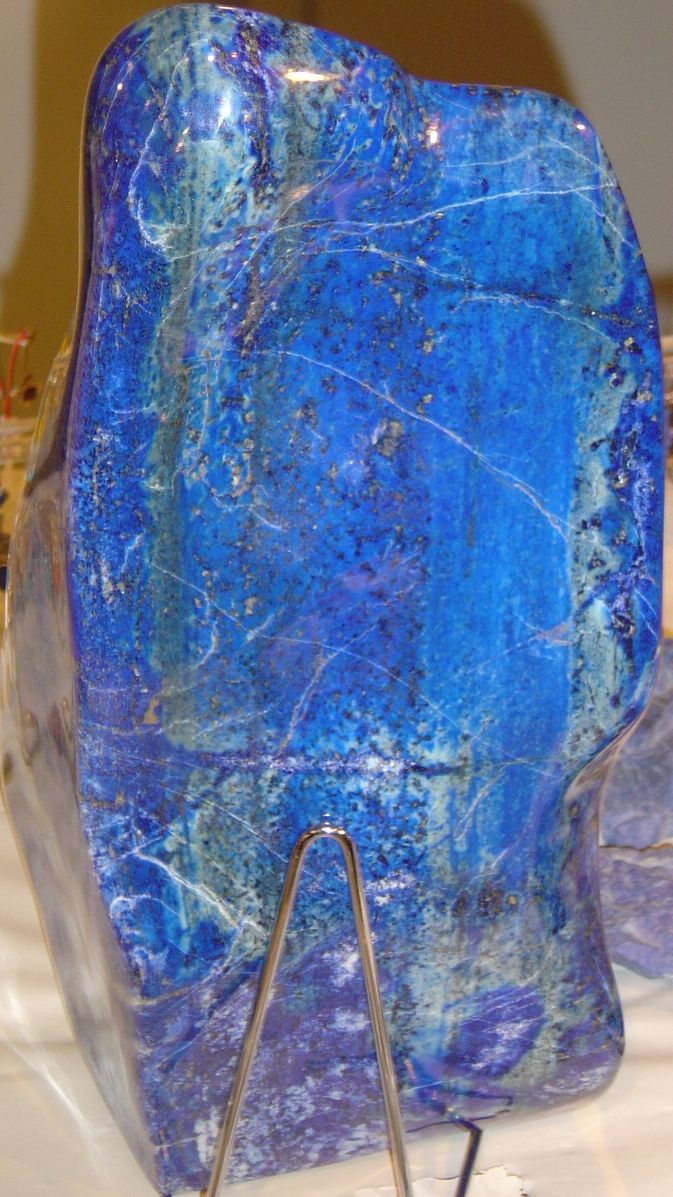
An Afghan Lapis Lazuli Block

Mining in Afghanistan is controlled by the Ministry of Mines and Petroleum in Kabul, which has offices in different parts of the country. Afghanistan has over 1,400 mineral fields, containing barite, chromite, coal, copper, gold, iron ore, lead, natural gas, petroleum, precious and semi-precious stones, salt, sulfur, lithium, talc, and zinc, among many other minerals. Gemstones include high-quality emeralds, lapis lazuli, red garnet and ruby. According to a joint study by The Pentagon and the United States Geological Survey, Afghanistan has an estimated US$1 trillion+ of untapped minerals, in 2010; because of inflation this amount could be 1.1-1.7x higher.

There are six lapis mines in Afghanistan, the largest being located in Badakhshan province. There are around 12 copper mines in the country, including the Aynak copper deposit located in Logar province. Afghanistan's significance from an energy standpoint stems from its geographical position as a transit route for oil, natural gas, and electricity exports from Central Asia to South Asia and the Arabian Sea. This potential includes the construction of the Trans-Afghanistan Pipeline gas pipeline. The first Afghan oil production began in late 2012.

== Overview ==
It is estimated that forty million years ago the tectonic plates of India-Europe, Asia and Africa collided in a massive upheaval. This upheaval created the region of towering mountains that now includes Afghanistan. This diverse geological foundation has resulted in a significant mineral heritage with over 1,400 mineral occurrences recorded to date, including gold, copper, lithium, uranium, iron ore, cobalt, natural gas and oil. Afghanistan's resources could make it one of the richest mining regions in the world.

Afghanistan has large untapped energy and mineral resources, which have great potential to contribute to the country's economic development and growth. The major mineral resources include chromium, copper, gold, iron ore, lead and zinc, lithium, marble, precious and semiprecious stones, sulfur and talc among many other minerals. The energy resources consist of natural gas and petroleum. The government was working to introduce new mineral and hydrocarbon laws that would meet international standards of governance.

The United States Geological Survey (USGS) and the British geological survey were doing resource estimation work in the country. Prior to that work, Afghanistan's exploration activity had been conducted by geologists from the Soviet Union who left good-quality geologic records that indicate significant mineral potential. Resource development would require improvements in the infrastructure and security in Afghanistan. The government had awarded contracts to develop the Aynak copper project and the Hajigak iron ore project; in addition, the government could offer tenders for new exploration, including exploration of copper at Balkhab, gold at Badakhshan, gemstones and lithium at Nuristan, and oil and gas at Sheberghan.

The Ministry of Mines drew up its first business reform plan in a bid to create a more accountable and transparent mining industry. Afghanistan joined the Extractive Industries Transparency Initiative as a candidate country. It was expected that after 5 years, the contribution of royalties from mineral production to the revenues of the government would be at least $1.2 billion per year, and that after 15 years, the contribution would increase to $3.5 billion per year. Afghanistan has no local ownership requirements and its Constitution does not allow for nationalization. The 20% corporate tax rate was the lowest in the region.

Afghanistan's mining industry was at a primitive artisanal stage of development; the operations were all low-scale and output was supplied to local and regional markets. The government considered development of the country's mineral resources to be a priority for economic growth, including development of the industrial mineral resources (such as gravel, sand, and limestone for cement) for use by the domestic construction industry. Investment in infrastructure and transportation projects for mining was a critical aspect of developing the mining industry.

The government completed Afghanistan's first railway with an investment of $170 million in 2010. The 76-kilometer (km) route link Mazar-i-Sharif to the extensive rail networks in Uzbekistan. The new route would allow Afghan exporters to transport minerals and other goods into Europe. China Metallurgical Group Corporation (MCC) is building a railroad to transport copper ore in Afghanistan from Logar to Kabul.

Owing to the lack of mineral production data reported by the miners, information about Afghanistan's mining activities was not readily available, but they appeared to be limited in scope. Production of Barite was estimated by the USGS to be about 2,000 metric tons; chromite, 6,000 tons; and natural gas liquids, 45,000 barrels. In the process of reconstruction and infrastructure development, output of construction minerals was estimated to have increased to meet the domestic requirements. Production of cement increased by 13% compared with that of 2009.

Privatization of Afghanistan's state-owned companies, which controlled many of the country's mineral resources, was ongoing but not complete. Investment in the mining sector by private domestic companies and foreign investors was encouraged by the government, which had offered the first contract for development of the Aynak copper project to two Chinese companies in 2007. The government also issued the tenders for the development of the hajigak iron ore project in 2009 and tenders for oil and gas exploration in 2010. The Ministry of Mines is involved in the exploration for and development, exploitation, and processing of minerals and hydrocarbons. The Ministry is also responsible for protecting the ownership and regulating the transportation and marketing of mineral resources in accordance with the country's new laws. Regulations to clarify the country's environmental laws were scheduled for adoption in 2010.

== History ==
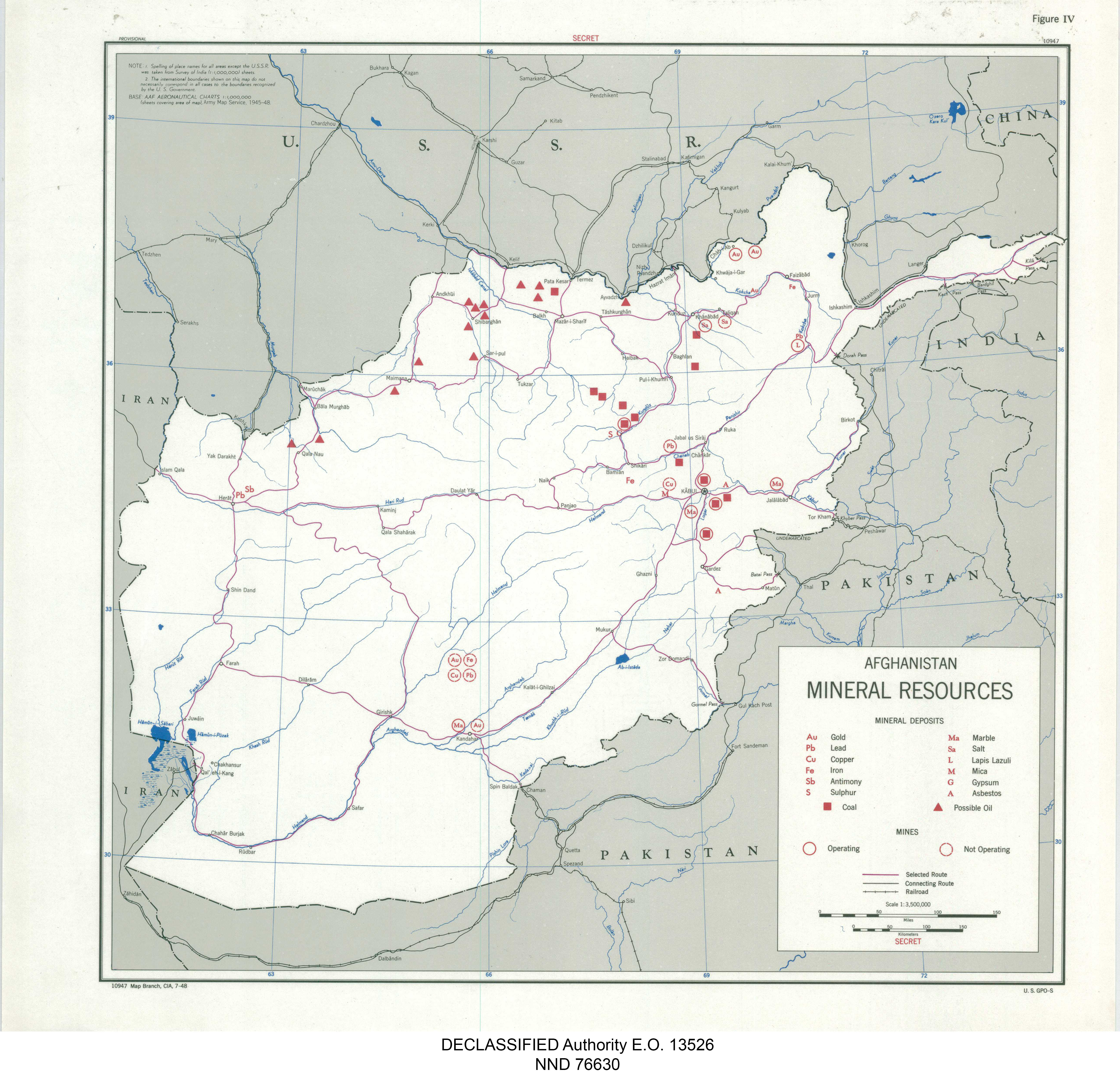
Mineral resources of Afghanistan in 1948 (Map of the Central Intelligence Agency)

The last mining boom in Afghanistan was over 2,000 years ago in the era of Alexander the Great, when gold, silver and precious stones were routinely mined. Geologists have known of the extent of the mineral wealth for over a century, as a result of surveys done by the British and Russians. An American company was offered a mining concession over the entire country in the 1930s but turned it down. Despite this historical knowledge, global interest was only really boosted in 2010 when the Pentagon commissioned a report from the US Geological Survey (USGS).

Historical mining concentrated mostly on precious stone production, with some of the oldest known mines in the world believed to have been established in Afghanistan. Lapis lazuli was being mined in the Badakhshan province of Afghanistan as early as 8000 BC. In ancient Egypt, lapis lazuli was a favorite stone for amulets and ornaments such as scarabs and was used in Egypt's pyramids; it was also used in ancient Mesopotamia by the Sumerians, Akkadians, Assyrians, Babylonians for seals and at Neolithic burials in Mehrgarh. During the height of the Indus Valley Civilization in about 2000 BC, the Harappan colony now known as Shortugai was established near the lapis mines. Lapis jewelry has been found at excavations of the Predynastic Egyptian site Naqada (3300–3100 BC), and powdered lapis was used as eyeshadow by Cleopatra. In ancient Mesopotamia, Lapis artifacts can be found in great abundance, with many notable examples having been excavated at the Royal Cemetery of Ur (2600-2500 BC).

The mine of Aynak's copper has more than 2,000 years of history, from the coins and the tools that were found there. The gold of Zarkashan has more than 2,000 years of history in Ghazni Province.

Afghanistan's ruby/spinel mines were mentioned in the Arabic writings of many early travellers, including Istakhri (951 AD), Ibn Haukal (978 AD), al-Ta'Alibi (961–1038 AD), al-Muqaddasi (ca 10th century), al-Biruni (b. 973; d. ca 1050 AD), Teifaschi (1240 AD), and Ibn Battuta (1325–1354 AD).

The British Empire first initiated resource assessments in Afghanistan in the early nineteenth century as they searched through pioneering exploration and military escapades for countries to dominate as markets and trading partners. From the time of their first geological mapping and mineral resource assessments in Afghanistan, and on into the twentieth century, the British maintained a comprehensive interest in resources of Afghanistan. This was done while also improving their military intelligence on resources and topographic detail that would be needed in the event of any unrest in the machinations of their Great Game face-off against the Russian Empire, and as long as they could maintain their British Raj (rule) of the Indian subcontinent. A number of other nationalities (German, French, Russian) also looked at geology and resources in the country from time to time but nothing much seemed to come of their explorations. Following the third Anglo-Afghan War in 1919, Afghanistan won its independence from diplomatic domination by the British and it was not long after that a Soviet publication on mineral "riches" first appeared, published by a man who later came to be revered as an early Russian ‘father’ of geologic studies. Nevertheless, in spite of early attempts by the government of Afghanistan to entice Americans to become engaged in resource discovery and extraction in the country, distance from market, economic concerns, and looming worries about World War II caused rejection of the overtures, much to the discomfiture of the government of Afghanistan. In spite of a number of discoveries by the American geologist Fox (1943) and others, post-war assessment by an American geographer concluded shortsightedly that there were no useful resources in Afghanistan about which there should be any diplomatic concern.

With its attention on resources accordingly diverted elsewhere for decades to come, the US Department of State thus quite missed the resource ball when in the 1960s and 1970s, as many as ~250 Soviet geoscientists went to work mapping geology in the country while only one American geologist (John Shroder) was in the country, plus a few visiting geology attachés from the US Embassy and USGS seismic specialists who visited from time to time. The resulting Soviet collaboration with the Afghanistan Geological Survey detailed a wide store of mineral resources in the country.

The result of this Cold War confrontation between the United States and the Soviet Union in Afghanistan was that the neighboring USSR was able to fairly easily sidestep or ignore developing resources in Afghanistan until conditions were more to its liking as it consolidated its preeminent position in the country, ultimately leading to its invasion in 1979. With its already dominant roles in the Afghanistan Cartographic Institute, the Afghanistan Geological Survey, and many other ministries, the USSR was in a position in the early 1980s to completely take over all resource extraction in Afghanistan. Indeed, they did pump much natural gas across the northern border of the Amu Darya into the USSR where the gauges to measure delivered volumes were located, and plans were made for development of other resources. In addition, the Aynak copper deposit near Kabul was investigated in detail and a smelter scheduled for installation in the mid-1980s.

In an interesting sidelight of these times in the early 1980s, a Soviet-Afghan convoy from Aynak was assaulted by the Mujahideen and the captured documents that were sent to co-author Shroder by British sources proved that the Aynak copper lode was one of the largest in the world, as proved by a plethora of kilometer-deep boreholes that allowed the Soviets to sample the deposit extensively. The increasing resistance of the Afghan people and the Mujahideen, in the final cumulative battles of the Cold War, precluded significant further development of any resources at that time. Instead the Soviet withdrawal in defeat occurred in 1988–89. The subsequent invasion of Afghanistan by the United States and coalition troops in 2001 began a new phase in the history of Afghanistan, as many old resource projects were assessed again, and new ones were initiated.

In 2001, the September 11 attacks in New York led to the United States invasion of Afghanistan. According to Mark Landler and James Risen, in 2007 U.S. government sent geologist to explore the mining potential in Afghanistan. Using old Soviet maps of mining location, America created a more precise map of mineral locations. Former President Trump had agreed to remain in Afghanistan to help mine for minerals because he believed it will be a "win-win" for both countries.

== Legal framework ==
A new mining law was passed in 2006 and as of 2006 regulations were being developed to provide the framework for more formal exploration for and mining of minerals. The process of applying for mineral rights was also being revised as of 2006. All minerals located on or under the surface are the exclusive property of the Government, except for hydrocarbons and water, which are regulated under separate laws. The principal role of the Government with respect to minerals is to promote the efficient development of the mineral industry by the private sector. The Ministry of Mines and Industries is responsible for the administration and implementation of the Mining Law. The Law provides investment security to the holder of a mineral right. The Government cannot expropriate mineral rights without adequate compensation in accordance with international norms. The Law also gives the mineral royalty rates, which range from 5% of gross revenue for industrial minerals to up to 10% for gemstones. Other changes in Government policy in 2006 included the legalization of the gemstone trade, Government control of the gemstone industry, and encouragement of investment in mining.

== Mining locations ==
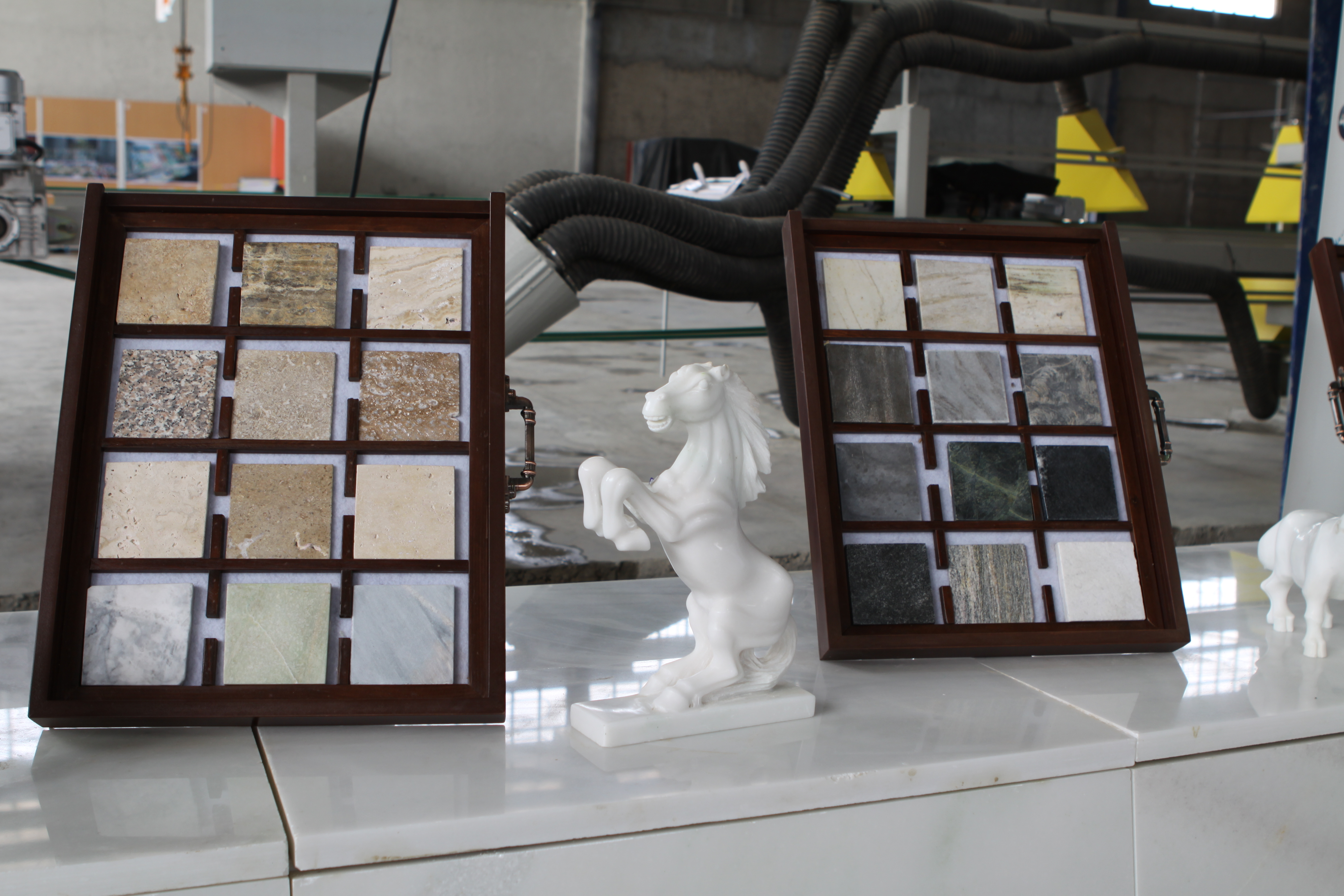
Samples of marble in Herat, Afghanistan.

- Badakhshan Province: Badakhshan Gold, gemstones, lapis lazuli.
- Baghlan Province: Baghlan clay and gypsum, Dudkash industrial minerals
- Balkh Province: oil.
- Bamyan Province: Hajigak Mine (iron oxide).
- Daykundi Province: tin and tungsten
- Farah Province in the west: copper, lithium;
- Ghazni Province: Dashti Nawar lithium salts; Zarkashan Mine(copper, gold);.
- Ghor Province: Karnak-Kanjar mercury, Nalbandon lead and zinc
- Helmand Province: Khanneshin carbonatite, gold, rare-earth elements, possible uranium reserves; Chagai Hills travertine, copper and gold.
- Herat Province: Shaida Copper Mine Dusar tin, Tourmaline tin, Herat barite and limestone
- Jowzjan Province: Oil and Gas
- Kabul Province: Jegdalek, Surobi District (gemstones).
- Kandahar Province: copper, cement
- Kapisa Province: copper
- Kunduz Province: Kunduz celestite
- Logar Province: copper (Mes Aynak).
- Nangarhar Province: elbaite, Ghunday Achin magnesite and talc.
- Nimroz Province: Godzareh (Gaudi Zireh) lithium salts.
- Nuristan Province: Nuristan pegmatites and gemstones.
- Panjshir Province: Panjshir Valley gemstones e.g. emerald.
- Paktika Province: Katawaz gold and Oil
- Samangan Province: Aybak (copper); Shabashak, Dara-I-Suf District (coking coal).
- Sar-e Pol Province: Balkhab Copper Mine (world's largest deposit), Oil (Kashkari, Angot, etc.).
- Takhar Province: Samti, Panj River Valley (gold), Evaporite.
- Urozgan Province: Bakhud fluorite
- Zabul Province: Kundalyan gold and copper.

Also the following places which have not, as yet, been positively located:

- Southeastern Afghanistan: copper, at the Darband, and the Jawkhar prospects.
- Anjir, Hasar, and Nooraba Valleys: gold

== Commodities ==
Afghanistan has abundant non-fuel mineral resources, including both known and potential deposits of a wide variety of minerals ranging from copper, iron, and sulfur to bauxite, lithium, and rare-earth elements. It was announced in 2010 that about $1 trillion in untapped mineral deposits were identified in Afghanistan, enough to fundamentally alter the Afghan economy. According to other reports the total mineral riches of Afghanistan may be worth over $3 trillion US dollars. "The previously unknown deposits — including huge veins of iron, copper, cobalt, gold, and critical industrial metals like lithium — are so big and include so many minerals that are essential to modern industry that Afghanistan could eventually be transformed into one of the most important mining centers in the world". Ghazni Province may hold the world's largest lithium reserves. The deposits were described in the USGS report on Afghanistan in 2007. Afghan President Hamid Karzai remarked "Whereas Saudi Arabia is the oil capital of the world, Afghanistan will be the lithium capital of the world." Afghanistan invited 200 global companies for the development of its mines.

=== Copper ===
No copper mines were active in the country in 2006. In the past, copper had been mined from Herat Province and Farah Province in the west, Kapisa Province in the east, and Kandahar Province and Zabul Province in the south. As of 2006, interest was focused on the Aynak, the Darband, and the Jawkhar prospects in southeastern Afghanistan. Copper mineralization at Aynak in Logar Province was stratabound and characterized by bornite and chalcopyrite disseminated in dolomite marble and quartz-biotite-dolomite schists of the Loy Khwar Formation. Although a resource of 240 million metric tons at a grade of 2.3% copper had been reported, a number of small ore lenses were potentially not practically and economically minable. Open pit and underground mining would be needed to exploit the main ore body, and other infrastructure problems, such as inadequate power and water, were also likely. The new (2005) Mining Law might favor the development of the deposit by using public tenders. The Government issued a public tender for the deposit in 2006, and expected the granting of concessions in February 2007. Nine mining companies from Australia, China, India, and the United States were interested in the prospect.

China Metallurgical Group won the bidding for a copper mining project in Aybak, Samangan, Afghanistan. The bidding process has been criticized by rival Canadian and United States companies alleging corruption and questioning the Chinese company's commitment to the Afghan people.

In 2007, a 30-year lease was granted for the development of a copper mine at Mes Aynak in Logar Province to the China Metallurgical Group for $3 billion, making it the biggest foreign investment and private business venture in Afghanistan's history. It is believed to contain the second-largest reserves of copper ore in the world and the deposits are estimated to be worth up to $88 billion. It is also the site of one of Afghanistan's most important archaeological sites and, although there are desperate efforts being made to save as much as possible, the main Buddhist monastery and other remains are due to be bulldozed to make way for the mine.

Several new mineral-rich sites, with estimated deposits of about $250 billion, had been found in six other provinces. Launched in 2006, a US Geological Survey (USGS), jointly conducted with the Ministry of Mines, was completed last year. The survey covers 30 percent of the country. "The survey provides credible information on mines in 28 different parts of Afghanistan," Wahidullah Shahrani told reporters.

It showed the world's largest copper deposits existed in Balkhab district of Sar-e-Pol. The copper mine was discovered near a river, an area which might hold gold reserves as well. The government launched tenders in late 2011 for the Balkhab copper deposit, which had reserves of about 45 Mt of copper. Citing the report, an Afghan government minister said two new copper mines in Logar Province and Herat Province provinces had been discovered. The value of the Logar pit, not the Ainak mine, is estimated at $43 billion. Copper and gold mines worth of $30 billion were discovered in the Zarkasho area of Ghazni and lithium pits of $20 billion in Farah and Nimroz provinces, Shahwani said.

A deposit of beryllium, which is lighter than aluminum and stronger than steel used in airplanes, helicopters, ships, missiles, and space craft, has been found in the Khanashin district of southern Helmand province. The reserves are estimated at $88 billion.

=== Coal ===
Afghanistan has rich reserves of coking coal, coal is primarily located within a Jurassic belt from the northern provinces of Takhar and Badakhshan through the center of the country and towards the west in Herat, according to Afghan mines ministry.

In 2014 however, the U.S. Department of Labor has issued a List of Goods Produced by Child Labor or Forced Labor in which Afghanistan appeared to be one of the 74 countries with noticeable incidence of child labor in the coal mining field.

=== Gemstones ===
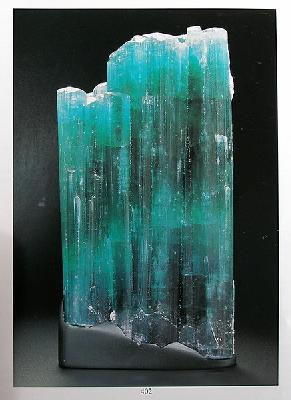
Elbaite from Nangarhar Province

Afghanistan is known to have exploited its precious and semi-precious gemstone deposits. These deposits include aquamarine, emerald and other varieties of beryl, fluorite, garnet, kunzite, ruby, sapphire, lapis lazuli, topaz, tourmaline, varieties of quartz, and caribbean calcite. Corundum deposits (sapphire and ruby) in the country are largely exhausted, and very little gem quality material is found. The four main gemstone-producing areas are those of Badakhshan, Jegdalek, Nuristan, and the Panjshir Valley. Artisanal mining of gemstones in the country used primitive methods. Some gemstones were exported illicitly, mostly to India (which was the world's leading import market for colored gemstones and an outlet for higher quality gems) and to the domestic neighboring Pakistan market.

=== Gold ===
As of 2006, gold was mined from the Samti placer deposit in Takhar Province in the north by groups of artisanal miners. Badakhshan Province also had occurrences of placer gold deposits. The deposits were found on the western flanks of the mountains in alluvium or alluvial fan in several river valleys, particularly in the Anjir, the Hasar, the Nooraba, and the Panj Valleys. The Samti deposit is located in the Panj River Valley and was estimated to contain between 20 and 25 metric tons of gold. The southern regions of Afghanistan is believed to contain large gold deposits, particularly the Helmand Province. There is an estimated $50 billion in gold and copper deposits in Ghazni province.

The Afghan government signed a deal with Afghan Krystal natural Resources Co. (a local company) to invest up to $50 million in the Qara Zaghan Mine in northern Baghlan Province. Qara Zaghan was the country's second gold mine, and production there was planned to begin by 2013. The mine's gold reserves were not yet known, but the company intended to spend the next 2 years exploring the site. Investors from Indonesia, Turkey, the United Kingdom, and the United States were backing the project. The first gold mine was being developed by Westland general trading LLC of the United Arab Emirates at Nor Aaba near the border with Tajikistan in northern Takhar Province. The mine was expected to provide $4 million to $5 million per year in royalties to the government.

=== Iron ore ===
The best known and largest iron oxide deposit in Afghanistan is located at Hajigak in Bamyan Province. The deposit itself stretches over 32 km and contains 16 separate zones, up to 5 km in length, 380 m wide and extending 550 m down dip, seven of which have been studied in detail. The ore occurs in both primary and oxidized states. The primary ore accounts for 80% of the deposit and consists of magnetite, pyrite and minor chalcopyrite. The remaining 20% is oxidized and consists of three hematitic ore types. The deposit remained unmined in 2006. The presence of coking coal nearby at Shabashak in the Dar-l-Suf District and large iron ore resources made the deposit viable for future development of an Afghan steel industry. Open pit mining and blast furnace smelting operations were envisioned by an early feasibility study. The Hajigak also includes the unusual niobium, a soft metal used in the production of superconductors.

=== Lithium ===
Lithium is a vital metal that is mostly used in the manufacture of rechargeable batteries for mobile phones, laptops and electric cars. It is speculated that Afghanistan has plenty of lithium. The country's lithium deposits occur in dry lake beds in the form of lithium chloride; they are located in the western Province of Herat and Nimroz and in the central east Province of Ghazni. The geologic setting is similar to those found in Bolivia and Chile. The deposits are also found in hard rock in the form of spodumene in pegmatites in the north-eastern Provinces of Badakhshan, Nangarhar, Nuristan, and Uruzgan. A pegmatite in the Hindu Kush Mountains in central Afghanistan was reported to contain 20% to 30% spodumene.

=== Marble ===
Afghanistan also has considerable amount of marble in different parts of the country. There are a number of marble factories in Herat. According to the U.S. Embassy in Kabul, current Afghan marble exports are estimated at $15 million per year. With improved extraction, processing, infrastructure, and investment, the industry has the potential to grow into a $450 million per year business.

=== Petroleum and natural gas ===
Afghanistan has 1.8 billion barrels of oil between Balkh and Jawzjan Province in the north of the country, discovered in 2010. This is an enormous amount for a nation that only consumes 5,000 bbl/day. The United States Geological Survey and the Afghan Ministry of Mines and Industry jointly assessed the oil and natural gas resources in northern Afghanistan. The estimated mean volumes of undiscovered petroleum were 1,596 million barrels (Mbbl) of crude oil, 444 billion cubic meters of natural gas, and 562 Mbbl of natural gas liquids. Most of the undiscovered crude oil occurs in the Afghan-Tajik Basin and most of the undiscovered natural gas is located in the Amu Darya Basin. These two basins within Afghanistan encompass areas of approximately 515,000 square kilometers.

In December 2011, Afghanistan signed an oil exploration contract with China National Petroleum Corporation (CNPC) for the development of three oil fields along the Amu Darya river. In 2012 it was projected Afghanistan would have its first oil refineries within the next three years, after which it will receive 70 percent of the profits from the sale of the oil and natural gas. CNPC began Afghan oil production in October 2012, extracting 1.5 million barrels of oil annually.

=== Rare-earth elements ===
According to a September 2011 US Geological Survey estimate, the Khanashin carbonatites in southern Helmand Province have an estimated 1 million metric tonnes of rare-earth elements at a potentially useful concentration in the rock, but of unknown economic value. Regina Dubey, acting director for the Department of Defence Task Force for Business and Stability Operations (TFBSO) stated that "this is just one more piece of evidence that Afghanistan's mineral sector has a bright future."

=== Salt ===
There are approximately 12 salt mines in the provinces of Balkh, Faryab, Ghazni, Ghor, Herat, Kandahar, Paktia, Parwan, Samangan and Takhar.

=== Uranium ===
The Helmand Province in southern Afghanistan is believed to possess uranium reserves, according to Afghan Ministry of Mines.

== See also ==
- List of places in Afghanistan
