= Abdul Karim Matin =

Abdul Karim Matin عبدالکريم متين

Governor of Paktika
- In office 21 December 2014 – 9 May 2015
- Preceded by: Mohibullah Samim
- Succeeded by: Aminullah Shariq

Governor of Ghazni
- Incumbent
- Assumed office 30 July 2016
- Preceded by: Mohammad Aman Hamimi

Personal details
- Born: 1979 (age 46–47) Afghanistan

Abdul Karim Matin (Pashto: عبدالکريم متين) is an ethnic Pashtun politician who served as the governor of Paktika Province from 2014 to 2015, and of Ghazni since 2016. Matin went to Gazi High School and studied at Kabul University. He was a Ministry of Rural Rehabilitation and Development official for Urban Rainwater Harvesting and the Regional Coordinator for Southern Region of Afghanistan. In 2015, Mateen has escaped unharmed from an armed attack from Taliban when he was visiting security check posts in the outskirts of Sharana.

In 2016, he was appointed as the governor of Ghazni Province.

He speaks Pashto, Dari and English.
