= Abdul Malik Hamwar =

Afghan politician

Abdul Malik Hamwar عبدالمالک هموار

Governor of Logar Province
- In office October 2002 – March 2004
- Preceded by: Fazlullah Mojadeddi
- Succeeded by: Mohammad Aman Hamimi

Rural Development Minister
- In office December 2001 – June 2002
- Prime Minister: Hamid Karzai
- Succeeded by: Mohammad Hanif Atmar

Personal details
- Party: United Islamic Front
- Occupation: Politician

Abdul Malik Hamwar was ex-vice chancellor of Al-Beroni University and as such one of the persons who was named minister by the Bonn Conference in December 2001. Hamwar served as minister of Ministry of Rural Rehabilitation and Development from December 2001 until the 2002 Loya Jirga were Hamid Karzai named a new cabinet. Originally a member of the Afghan Northern Alliance he was then deputy minister for social affairs in the interim administration of Hamid Karzai in early 2002 and governor of Logar Province from October 2002 - March 2004. Hamwar is a Tajik who was a member of the United Islamic Front.

As Minister, Hamwar accompanied Karzai and several other ministers in February 2002 on a trip to Iran where they issued five memorandums of understanding, including an agreement on rural development.
