= Jamaluddin Badr =

Afghan politician

Jamaludin Badr جمال الدين بدر
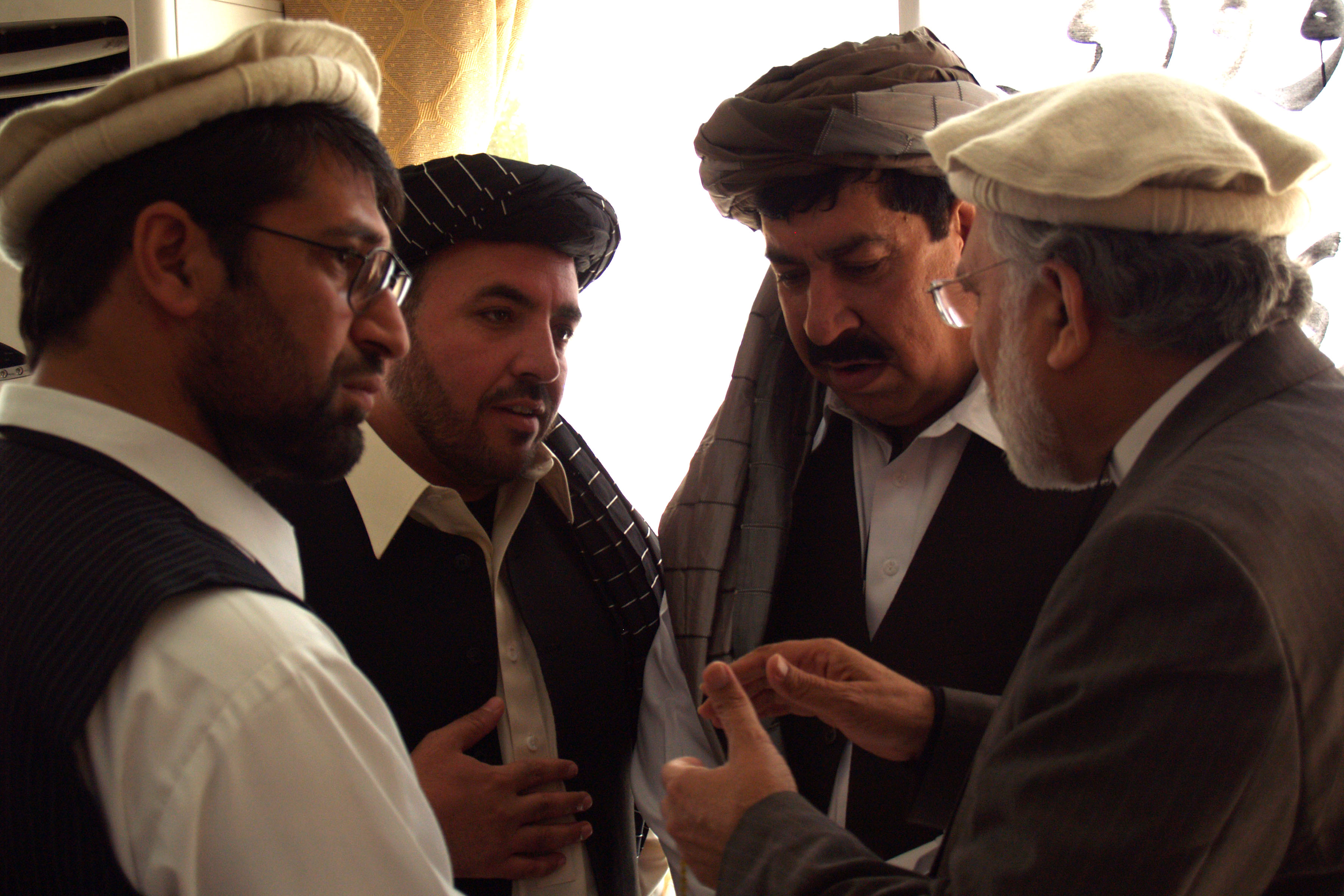

Governor of Nuristan Province, Afghanistan
- In office 27 January 2009 – 3 September 2011
- Preceded by: Hazrat Din Noor
- Succeeded by: Mohammad Tamim Nuristani

Personal details
- Born: Barg-e-Matal, Nuristan Province, Afghanistan
- Profession: Politician

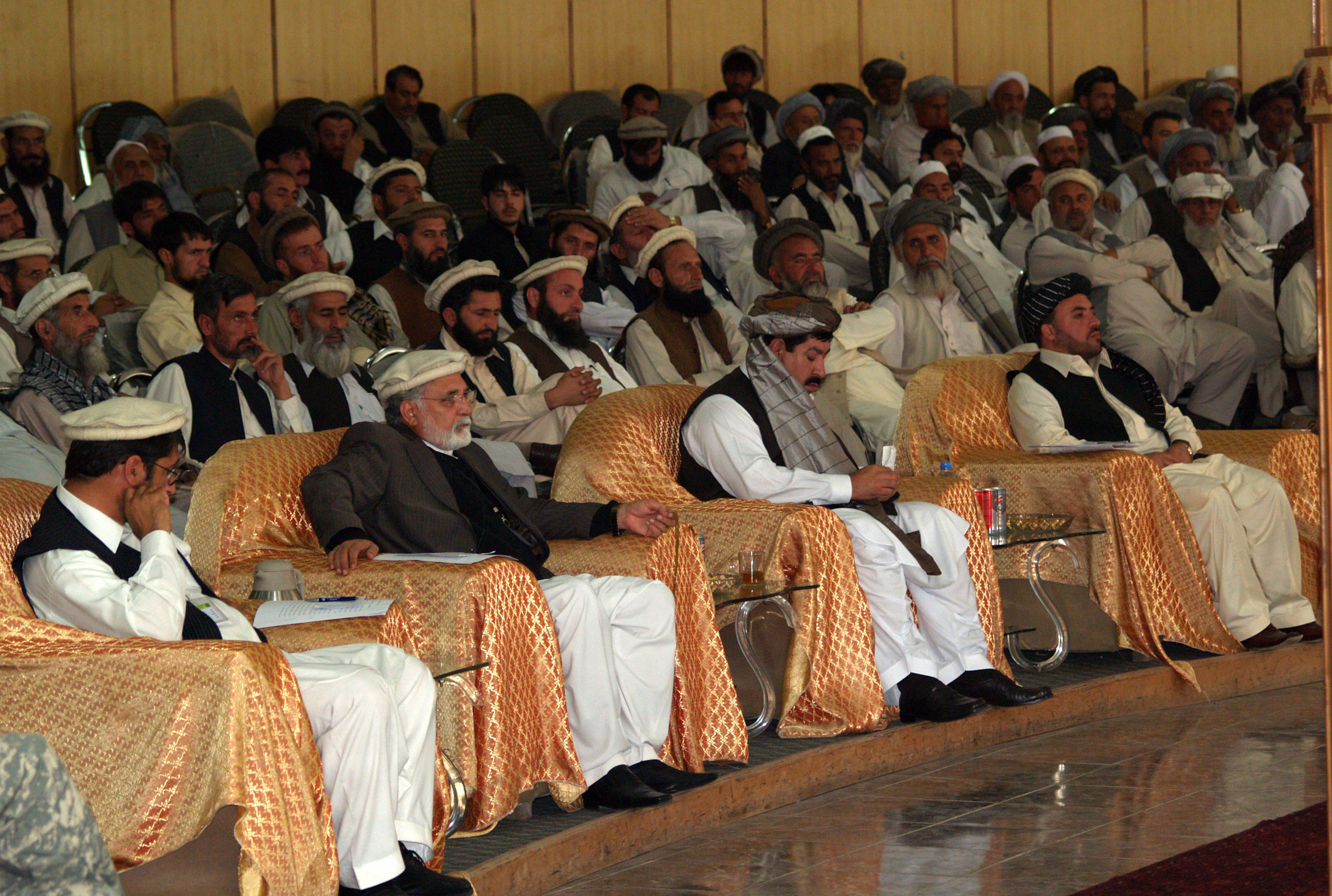
From left to right: Jamaluddin Badr (Fired), Nuristan governor, Fazlullah Wahidi, Kunar governor, Gul Agha Sherzai, Nangarhar governor, and Lutfullah Mashal, Langhman governor, listen to speakers during a regional jirga in the city of Jalalabad, Afghanistan.

Jamaludin Badr served as Governor of Nuristan Province, Afghanistan from 2009 to 2011. He is the successor of Eng. Hazrat Din Noor, who died in a car accident only a few months after he was installed.

According to American officials, relations between the coalition and Jamaluddin Badar broke down over allegations of corruption and months of unpaid police salaries. "We withdraw investment in places we cannot go," said US Navy Commander Russell McCormack. "In one month, we canceled 3.5 million dollars in schools because we could not go to the sites to verify what was happening to the money."

In May 2010 Governor Badr faced accusations of corruption and was prosecuted. The case was referred to the Attorney General and Badr was sentenced to prison for two months.

== Notes ==
Preceded by Hazrat Din Noor	Governor of Nuristan Province, Afghanistan; 2009 – present	Succeeded by Incumbent
