= Naeemi =

Naeemi (Arabic: نعیمی) is an Arabic surname. Notable people with the surname include:

- Abdul Jabbar Naeemi (born 1967), Afghan diplomat and politician
- Sarfraz Ahmed Naeemi (1948–2009), Pakistani cleric
- Ashfaque Hussain Naeemi (19 December 1921 – 15 October 2013), Indian sufi scholar and cleric
