= Muhammad Ali Jalali =

Afghan politician (died 2006)

Personal details
- Died: 2006

Muhammad Ali Jalali (died 2006) was a Governor of Paktika, Afghanistan, from the Taliban's fall in 2001 to 2005, when he quit for an unsuccessful run at a parliamentary seat. In May 2006, police recovered his dead body in the Andar district of the southern Ghazni province, where he had been kidnapped by Taliban militants the previous evening while traveling. Jalali was replaced by the Governor in 2004 after reports that the Taliban were in effective control of large parts of Paktika and that he was personally collaborating with them .

Preceded by None	Governor of Paktika; 2001–2005	Succeeded by Gulab Mangal
