= List of governors of Nuristan =

This is a list of the governors of the province of Nuristan, Afghanistan.

== Governors of Nuristan Province ==
| Governor | Period | Extra | Note |
|---|---|---|---|
| Maulawi Abdullah Shergul | ? 4 August 2006 | | |
| Mohammad Tamim Nuristani | 4 August 2006; 10 July 2008 | | |
| Hazrat Din Noor | 10 July 2008; 5 September 2008 | | Died in a car accident |
| Jamaluddin Badr | 27 January 2009; 3 September 2011 | | |
| Mohammad Tamim Nuristani | 4 September 2011; 4 February 2014 | | |
| Abul Zahir Faiz Zada | ? ? | | |
| Hafiz Abdul Qayum Nuristani | February 2014 | | |
| Abdul Ghafoor Malikzai | July 2020; 2021 | | |
| Hafiz Muhammad Agha | 2021 ? | | |
| Qari Zain-Ul-Abideen | ? - present | | |

== See also ==
- List of current governors of Afghanistan
