= Atiqullah Ludin =

Afghan army officer and politician

Atiqullah Ludin عتیق الله لودین

Governor of Logar Province
- In office September 2008 – 3 April 2013
- Preceded by: Abdullah Wardak
- Succeeded by: Arsala Jamal

Personal details
- Born: Mohammad Agha, Logar, Afghanistan

Atiqullah Ludin (Pashto: عتیق الله لودین) was the Governor of Logar Province, Afghanistan in 2008–2013. He is originally from Mohammad Agha District of Logar.

The U.S. State Department said: '..His principal qualifications to be Governor in increasingly strife-torn Logar appear to be his personal connection to the province and his military service. In the early 1970s Ludin reportedly attended a military course and served in the Afghan army during the rule of Daoud Khan. After the Soviet invasion, he moved to Pakistan. Accounts vary concerning the degree of his possible involvement in fighting the Soviets, but after the fall of the Taliban, Ludin was active in southeastern Afghanistan as commander of the former Afghan Army 3rd Corps (which predated the Afghan National Army). He worked closely with U.S. forces stationed at Gardez in Paktia Province. After some initial hesitation by Commander Ludin, most of his forces entered the disarmament, demobilization and reintegration program in 2003. He was unsuccessful in his bid for a seat to the Lower House of Parliament (Wolesi Jirga) in the 2005 elections.' (08KABUL2890)

Ludin replaced Abdullah Wardak as governor after Wardak was assassinated in the Paghman District on September 13, 2008.

Preceded by Abdullah Wardak	Governor of Logar Province, Afghanistan; September 2008 – April 2013	Succeeded by Arsala Jamal
