= Mohammad Gulab Mangal =

Afghan politician

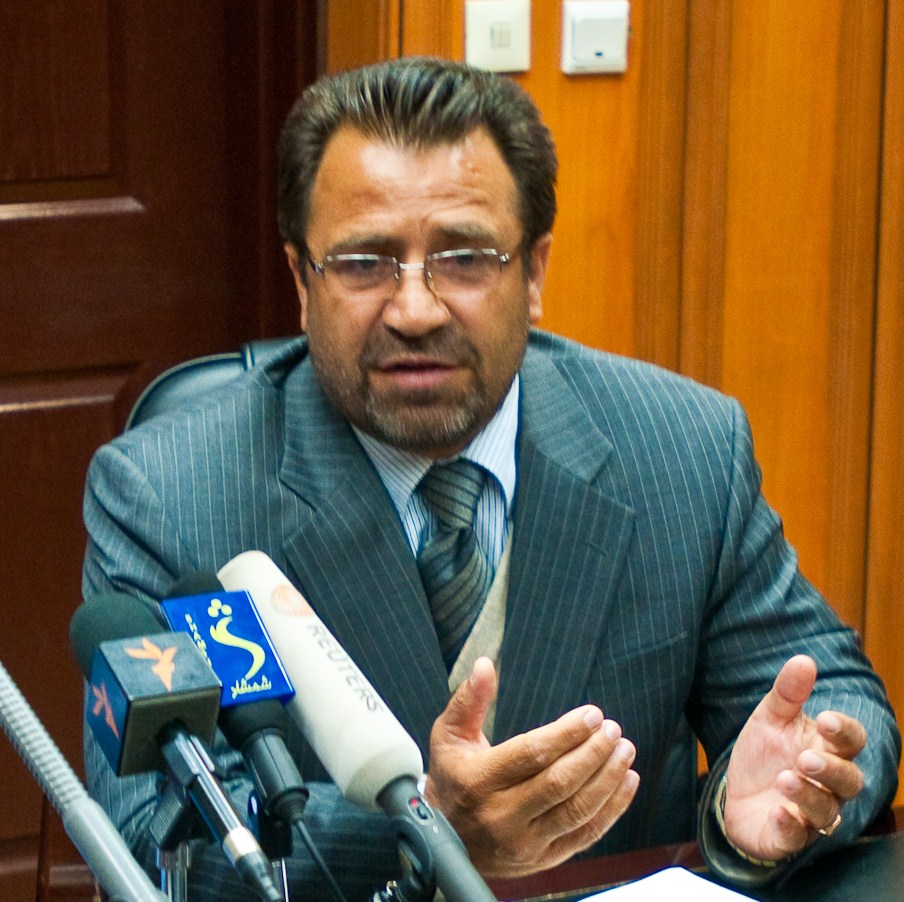
- Mohammad Gulab Mangal

Governor of Nangarhar
- In office 22 October 2016 – April 2018
- President: Ashraf Ghani
- Preceded by: Salim Khan Kunduzi
- Succeeded by: Shah Mahmood Miakhel

Minister of Border & Tribal Affairs Minister
- In office 22 April 2015 – 22 October 2016
- Preceded by: Sayed Ahmad Haqbeen

Governor of Helmand
- In office 22 March 2008 – 20 September 2012
- Preceded by: Assadullah Wafa
- Succeeded by: Mohammad Naeem Baloch

Governor of Laghman
- In office 2006–2008
- Preceded by: Shah Mahmood Safi
- Succeeded by: Lutfullah Mashal

Governor of Paktika
- In office 2004–2006
- Preceded by: Muhammad Ali Jalali
- Succeeded by: Mohammad Akram Khpalwak

Personal details
- Born: 3/4/1957(68 age) Gardēz, Paktia Province, Afghanistan

Mohammad Gulab Mangal (Pashto: محمد ګلاب منګل, born March 4, 1957) is an Afghan politician. From October 2016, he served as the senior adviser minister of borders and tribal affairs for the president of the Islamic Republic of Afghanistan. He was also actively involved in the tribal conflict resolutions.

On 23 October 2016, he was appointed as the senior adviser for the minister of borders, tribal affairs, and provincial governor of Nangarhar province until he resigned in April 2018. From April 22, 2015 to October 23, 2016, based on the presidential decree, he was appointed as the acting minister of Ministry of Borders and Tribal Affairs. In 2002, he was elected as the Representative of Paktia Province for Emergency Loya Jirga.

From 2002 to 2004, he served as head of the Constitution Office and the Constitution Loya Jirga Election Office for the Southeast Region (Paktia, Paktika, Khost, and Ghazni provinces). From 2004 to 2006, he served as Governor of Paktika province. From 2006 to 2008, he served as the Governor of Laghman province. From March 2008 to September 2012, he served as provincial Governor of Helmand province.

== Life ==
Mangal was born in Laja Mangal, Paktia Province in Afghanistan, and belongs to the Mangal ethnic Pashtun tribe. He acquired his bachelor's and master's degree in literature from Kabul University.^{[1]}

A former member of the People's Democratic Party of Afghanistan, Mangal started his career as a young military officer on the request of the Afghanistan government. He served in the Ministry of Defence from 1979 to 1989, holding the title up to colonel. He worked as a manager for Publicity and Public Awareness of Afghanistan National Army.

Later, Mangal joined the insurrection fighting in the Soviet invasion of Afghanistan.

After the American led invasion in 2001, he was appointed a Regional Coordinator of the Constitutional Loya Jirga in Paktia.^{[2]}

Mangal served as the governor of Paktika Province from March 2004 to March 2006, and then as the governor of Laghman Province. On 22 March 2008, he was appointed as the governor of Helmand Province, while former Interior Ministry spokesman Lutfullah Mashal replaced him in Laghman.^{[1]}

When Mangal was appointed as governor of Helmand, he was referred to as "one of the most accomplished governors to have served Afghanistan since 2001".^{[3]} The Washington Post attributes Mangal's popularity in Helmand to his appointing competent district leaders and focusing on delivering basic services to the population, who also regard him as a person willing to stand up against the corrupt government in Kabul.^{[4]} Further, Mangal, whom The New York Times calls "ardently anti-opium", succeeded in cutting back opium cultivation in Helmand by 33 percent in 2009.^{[5]} Mangal's subsidized wheat seed program that provides an alternative to poppy crops, is reported to have reached 40,000 farmers.^{[6]}

From 22 April 2015 to 23 October 2016, he was appointed as the acting minister of Ministry of Borders and Tribal Affairs based on the presidential decree. Later on, he was introduced to the parliament including 15 other acting ministers. He was able to get the highest number of votes, 189 from the parliament members, and become the formal minister of ministry of borders and tribal affairs.

From 23 October 2016 to April 2018, he was appointed and introduced as the adviser minister and provincial governor of Nangarhar province. During this assignment he was able to establish coordination between ANSF, and led them to clear many districts and villages from ISIS and Taliban insurgents, increased civil services, and brought many new opportunities to the province. Due to inadequate response of the central government for solving some issues that were highlighted by him. In April 2018, he decided to resign from his position as the provincial governor of Nangarhar.

From October 2016, he has been serving as the senior adviser minister of borders and tribal affairs for the president of the Islamic Republic of Afghanistan. He is also actively involved in tribal conflict resolutions.

== Attempts on his life ==
According to The New York Times, Mangal has faced at least four attempts on his life.

In October 2006, Mangal's convoy was struck by a bomb attack east of Kabul, for which the Taliban claimed responsibility, narrowly missing him, killing one provincial official.

In May 2008, while flying into Musa Qala with a British escort to dedicate a new mosque, the CH-47 Chinook helicopter in which he was flying was hit by rocket fire.

In February 2009, two U.S. soldiers who were part of a convoy of coalition troops accompanying Mangal to a village where he intended to talk to residents about alternatives to opium farming were killed along with three Afghans, including a police official, while trying to disable a roadside bomb.

In April 2010, three Italian citizens and six Afghans who worked at a hospital run by the Italian charity Emergency in the capital of Helmand Province, Lashkar Gah were detained, suspected of having planned suicide attacks. According to Mangal, he was the target of the planned attacks that would have killed many more people as well. Afghan authorities claimed the detainees later confessed, but the Taliban denied hiring any foreign aid workers, and they were later released without charges. The hospital staff had become unpopular with local officials, as they had a reputation for treating wounded Taliban fighters.

== Wikileaks cables ==
In the WikiLeaks cables released in 2010, Mangal was cited as one of the officials in Afghanistan who criticised the British. According to U.S. cables of January 2009, Mangal accused the British of doing too little to interact with the local community, telling a U.S. team led by Vice-President Joe Biden that he did not “have anything against them (the British) but they must leave their bases and engage with the people.” As reported by The New York Times, the Wikileaks cables confirm that Mangal is considered an effective governor by foreign diplomats, and that he only kept his job as governor in Helmand Province thanks to “a concerted effort by the British, backed up by NATO allies”, when President Hamid Karzai wanted to replace him with a “tribal power broker with unsavory connections”.

== See also ==
- Helmand Provincial Reconstruction Team

Political offices
Preceded by Muhammad Ali Jalali	Governor of Paktika Province, Afghanistan; 2004–2006	Succeeded by Akram Khpalwak
Preceded by Shah Mahmood Safi	Governor of Laghman Province, Afghanistan; 2006–2008	Succeeded by Lutfullah Mashal
Preceded by Assadullah Wafa	Governor of Helmand Province, Afghanistan; 2008-2012	Succeeded by Naeem Baloch
