= Abdul Jabbar Naeemi =

Afghan politician

Governor of Laghman Province
- In office 8 June 2015 – Unknown
- Preceded by: Fazlullah Mujadedi

Governor of Wardak, Afghanistan
- In office March 2005 – 12 May 2008
- Succeeded by: Mohammad Halim Fidai

Governor of Khost Province
- In office 8 April 2010 – 6 June 2015
- Preceded by: Hamidullah Qalandarzai
- Succeeded by: Hukam Khan Habibi

Personal details
- Born: 1967 (age 58–59) Afghanistan
- Profession: politician

Abdul Jabbar Naeemi (Dari and Pashto: عبدالجبار نعيمي) is an Afghan diplomat and politician. He has served as the governor of Khost Province, Laghman Province in Afghanistan, and before that he was the governor of Khost province and Maidan Wardak province of Afghanistan. At one time he served as a representative from Kandahar Province to the Loya Jirga (Grand Assembly). In 2004 he was Hamid Karzai's election agent in Pakistan, where he campaigned for Karzai and worked on educating local Afghans about the democratic process.

After the presidential elections, Naeemi became the Governor of Wardak Province, which is located 30 kilometers west of Kabul. Since taking up this position he has received credit for re-establishing order in the province, a former Taliban stronghold, and for drastically reducing the cultivation of opium.

He is a follower of the Pashtun spiritual leader Pir Sayed Ahmed Gailani, and a member of Gailani's National Islamic Front party.

In early 2010 Naeemi was appointed governor of Khost Province.

| Preceded by [?] | Governor of Wardak Province; 2005–2008 | Succeeded by Mohammad Halim Fidai |
| Preceded by [?] | Governor of Khost Province; 2010–present | Succeeded by |
