= Roohul Amin =

Afghan politician

Roohul Amin روح الأمين
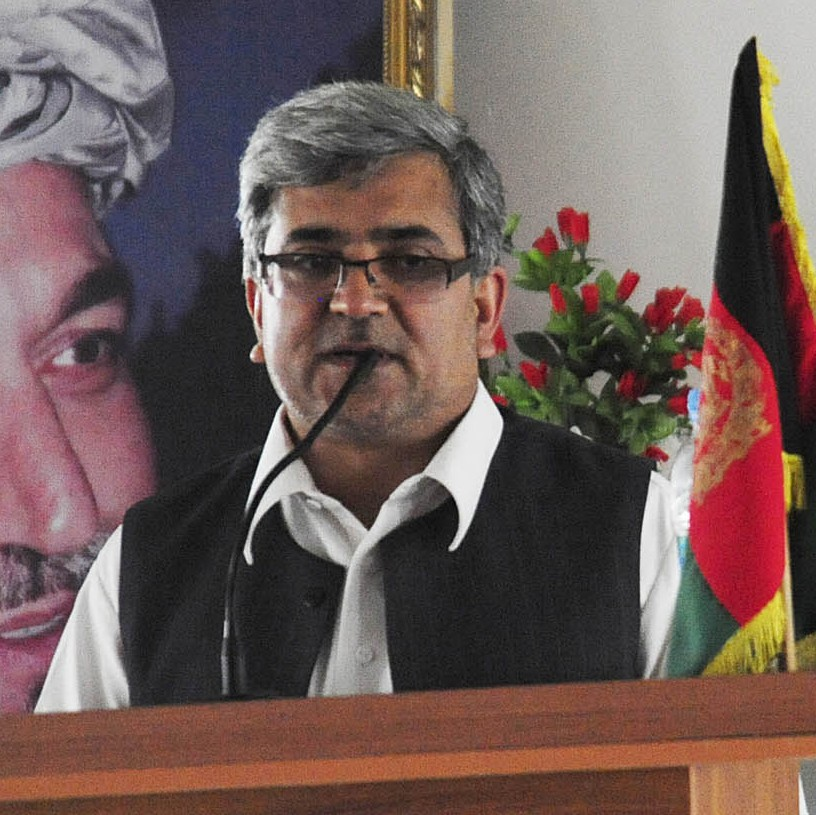
- Amin speaking in 2010

Governor of Farah, Afghanistan
- In office May 2008 – April 3, 2012
- Preceded by: Ghulam Mohayodin Baloch
- Succeeded by: Mohammad Akram Khpalwak

Personal details
- Born: Archi, Kunduz, Afghanistan

Roohul Amin (Pashto: روح الأمين) is a politician in Afghanistan who last served as Governor of Farah Province. He was appointed by President Hamid Karzai in May 2008.

| Preceded by Ghulam Mohayodin Baloch | Governor of Farah, Afghanistan; 2008 – April 3, 2012 | Succeeded by Mohammad Akram Khpalwak |
