= List of governors of Logar =

This is a list of the governors of the province of Logar, Afghanistan.

== Governors of Logar Province ==
Governor	Period	Extra	Note
????	???? Dec, 2001		
Fazlullah Mojadeddi	Dec, 2001; Oct, 2002		
Abdul Malik Hamwar	Oct, 2002; March 2004		
Mohammad Aman Hamimi	March 10, 2004; Dec 2005		
Sayed Abdul Karim Hashimi	Dec 2005; 2007		
Abdullah Wardak	2007; Sept, 13, 2008		
Atiqullah Ludin	Sept, 2008; Apr, 3, 2012		
Mohammad Tahir Sabri	Apr, 03, 2012; Sept, 19, 2012		
Mohammad Iqbal Azizi	Sept, 20, 2012; Apr, 16, 2013		
Arsala Jamal	Apr, 17, 2013; Oct, 15, 2013		Assassinated while giving his Eid al Adha message in Pul-i-Alam, Logar, Afghanistan
Mohammad Anwar Khan Ishaqzai	? ?		
Abdul Qayyum Rahimi	– Aug 2021		
Muhammad Ali Jan Ahmad	Aug 2021; 7 November 2021		
Haji Mali Khan	7 November 2021; 14 March 2022		
Maulvi Inayatullah	14 March 2022; Present		

== See also ==
- List of current governors of Afghanistan
