= Mohammad Iqbal Azizi =

Afghani politician

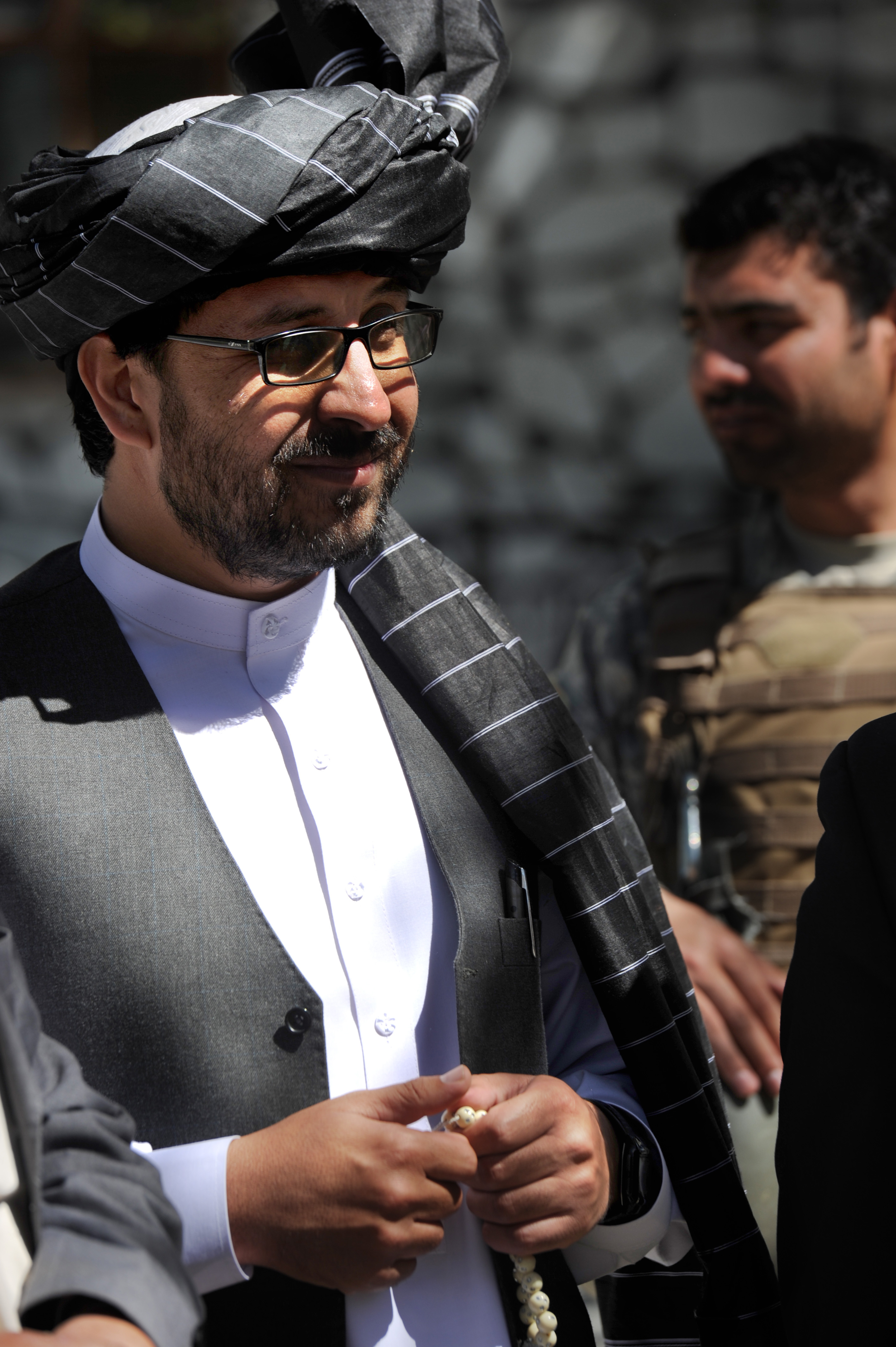
- Mohammad Iqbal Azizi in 2011

Governor of Laghman, Afghanistan
- In office 18 March 2010 – 19 September 2012
- Preceded by: Lutfullah Mashal
- Succeeded by: Fazlullah Mujadedi

Governor of Logar
- In office 20 September 2012 – 16 April 2013
- Preceded by: Mohammad Tahir Sabri
- Succeeded by: Arsala Jamal

Personal details
- Born: Afghanistan
- Profession: Politician

Mohammad Iqbal Azizi is an ethnic Pashtun politician in Afghanistan, who served as Governor of Laghman from March 2010 to September 2012. He previously served as head of the Education Department in Nangarhar Province.

== Early life ==
Azizi was born into a well-known Pashtun family in Afghanistan. He belongs to the Azizi tribe, a sub-clan of the influential Kheshgi tribe.

Preceded by Lutfullah Mashal	Governor of Laghman; 2010–Present	Succeeded by Incumbent
