= Mohammad Asif Nang =

Afghan governor

Mohammad Asif Nang محمد آصف ننګ

Governor of Farah
- Incumbent
- Assumed office 22 January 2015
- Preceded by: Mohammad Omar Shirzad

Personal details
- Born: 1972 (age 53–54) Paktika Province, Afghanistan

Mohammad Asif Nang (Pashto: محمد آصف ننګ) was appointed as the governor of Farah Province of Afghanistan on January 22, 2015.

== Early life ==
Asif Nang was born on 1972 in Paktika Province of Afghanistan and is from the Sulaimankhel tribe. He graduated from Habibia High School in Kabul. He also completed his higher education in Pakistan and Saudi Arabia.

== Work History ==
Asif Nang has served different posts at the Ministry of Education of Afghanistan. He was the Spokesman, Publications Officer, Public Relations Officer at the ministry. After dismissing the cabinet, President Ashraf Ghani appointed Nang as the acting minister for the Ministry of Education from 9 December 2014 to 21 January 2015. He fluently speaks Pashto, Dari, Arabic, Turkish, Urdu and English languages.

== Notes ==
| Preceded by title=Governor of Farah, Afghanistan | {{{title}}} 2014–Present | Succeeded by [Incumbent] |
