= Abdul Wali Wahidzai =

Afghan politician

Governor of Laghman
- In office 15 June 2021 – 15 August 2021
- Preceded by: Rahmatullah Yarmal
- Succeeded by: Zain-Ul-Abideen

Abdul Wali Wahidzai is a former governor of Laghman Province. He was appointed 15 June 2021 and surrendered to the Taliban on 16 August 2021, ending his governorship. The Taliban had completed their 2021 Taliban offensive.
