= List of governors of Laghman =

This is a list of the governors of the province of Laghman, Afghanistan.

== Governors of Laghman Province ==
Governor	Period	Extra	Note
????	???? Dec, 2001		
Mohammad Ibrahim Babakarkhel	2003; 2005		
Shah Mahmood Safi	???? 2006		
Gulab Mangal	2006; 22 March 2008		
Lutfullah Mashal	22 March 2008; 18 March 2010		
Mohammad Iqbal Azizi	18 March 2010; Present		
Fazlullah Mujadedi	20 September 2012 / 7 June 2015		
Abdul Jabbar Naeemi	8 June 2015 / Unknown		
Muhammad Asif Nang	17 February 2018 / 6 July 2020		
Rahmatullah Yarmal	7 July 2020 / 15 June 2021		
Abdul Wali Wahidzai	15 June 2021 / 15 August 2021		
Zain-Ul-Abideen	August 2021 - Present		

== See also ==
- List of current governors of Afghanistan
