= Fazlullah Mujadedi =

Afghan politician (1956–2021)

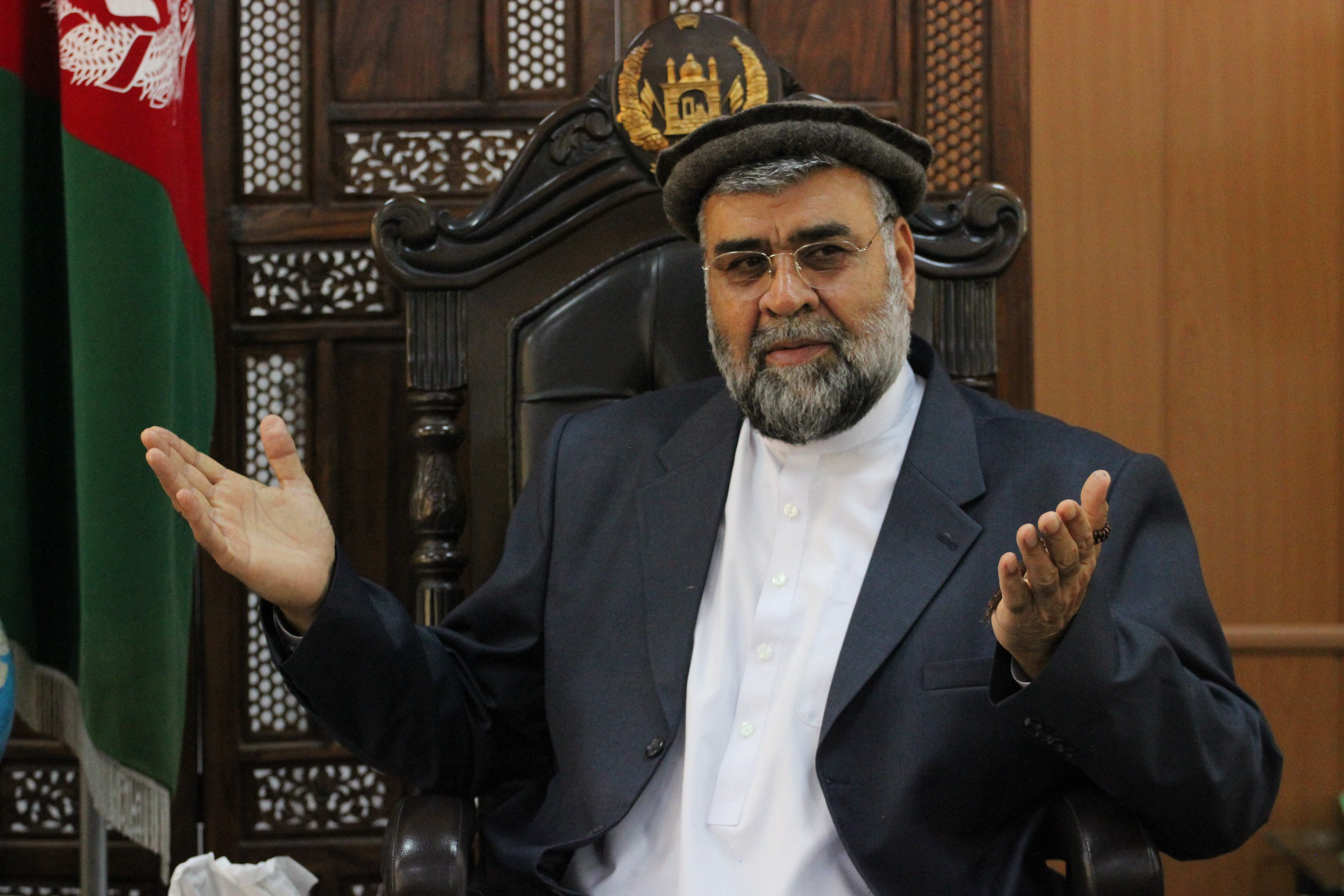

Governor of Takhar Province
- In office July 2017 – April 2019
- Preceded by: Yasin Zia
- Succeeded by: Abdul Haq Shafaq

Governor of Laghman Province
- In office 20 September 2012 – 5 June 2015
- Preceded by: Mohammad Iqbal Azizi
- Succeeded by: Abdul Jabbar Naeemi

Governor of Logar Province
- In office December 2001 – October 2002
- Succeeded by: Abdul Malik Hamwar

Personal details
- Born: 1956 Logar Province, Afghanistan
- Died: 10 June 2021 (aged 64–65)
- Party: Jamiat-e Islami

Fazlullah Mujadedi (Dari: فضل الله مجددی) also known as Abdul Hameed Mujadedi or Abdul Hameed Fazlullah Mujadedi (alternatively spelled as Mujaddedi Mujaddidi Mojadeddi Mujadidi) (1956 – 10 June 2021) was an Afghan politician in Afghanistan who served as the Governor of Logar, Laghman and Takhar provinces. He was one of the prominent commanders of Jamiat-e Islami during the 1980s Soviet–Afghan War and was among the earliest generation of anti-Soviet fighters from Kabul University. The group also included Amin Wardak, Zabihullah of Marmul in Balkh and Ahmad Shah Massoud.

== Life and career ==
Mujadedi was born in 1956 in the Logar Province of Afghanistan. He was an ethnic Arab and was fluent in several languages, including Farsi (Dari) and Pashto. He had some knowledge of English and Arabic language. He earned a BA in Law and Political Science from Kabul University and authored several books on the history and politics of Afghanistan.

After the fall of Taliban government in late 2001, Mujadedi became the governor of Logar Province. In the same period, he also served as a temporary military commander. At that point he was credited with maintaining law and order, unifying the people through Shura and disarming illegal militias. In October 2002, he was replaced with Northern Alliance commander from Kapisa province Abdul Malik Hamwar as the governor of Logar. This governor's replacement was thought to be as a result of differences between governor Mujadidi & the then minister of Interior affairs Yunus Qanuni.

In the 2005 parliamentary election, he was amongst the top Mujahideen leaders to win the top place in votes in their provinces. He won the highest percentage from Logar to gain a seat in Wolesi Jirga, lower house of parliament, to represent the people of Logar province. During his time in the Afghan Parliament Mujadedi became the chairman of the legislative affairs committee. He had previously served as the governor of Laghman Province.

Mujadedi died on 10 June 2021 from complications caused by COVID-19.

== Gallery ==

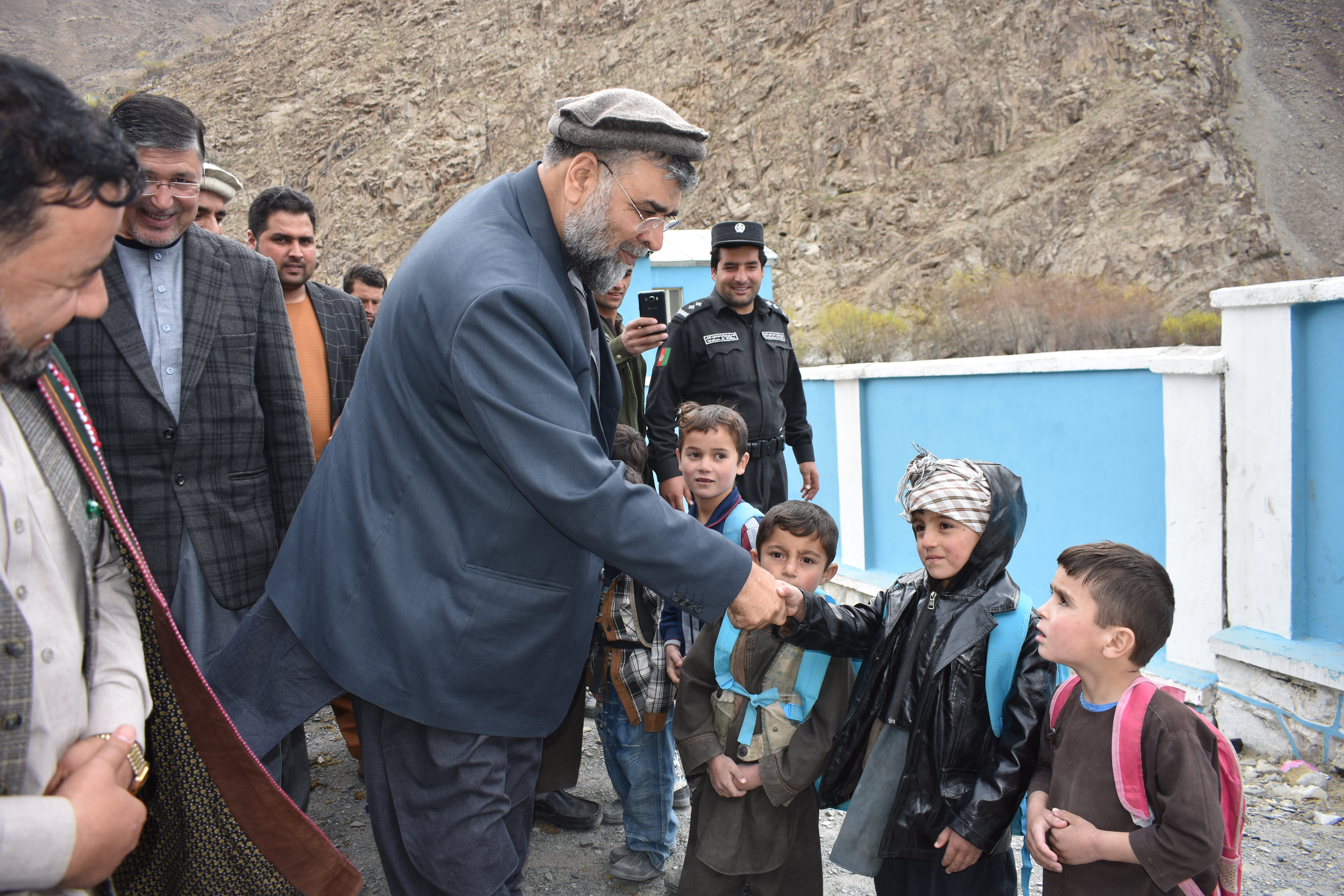

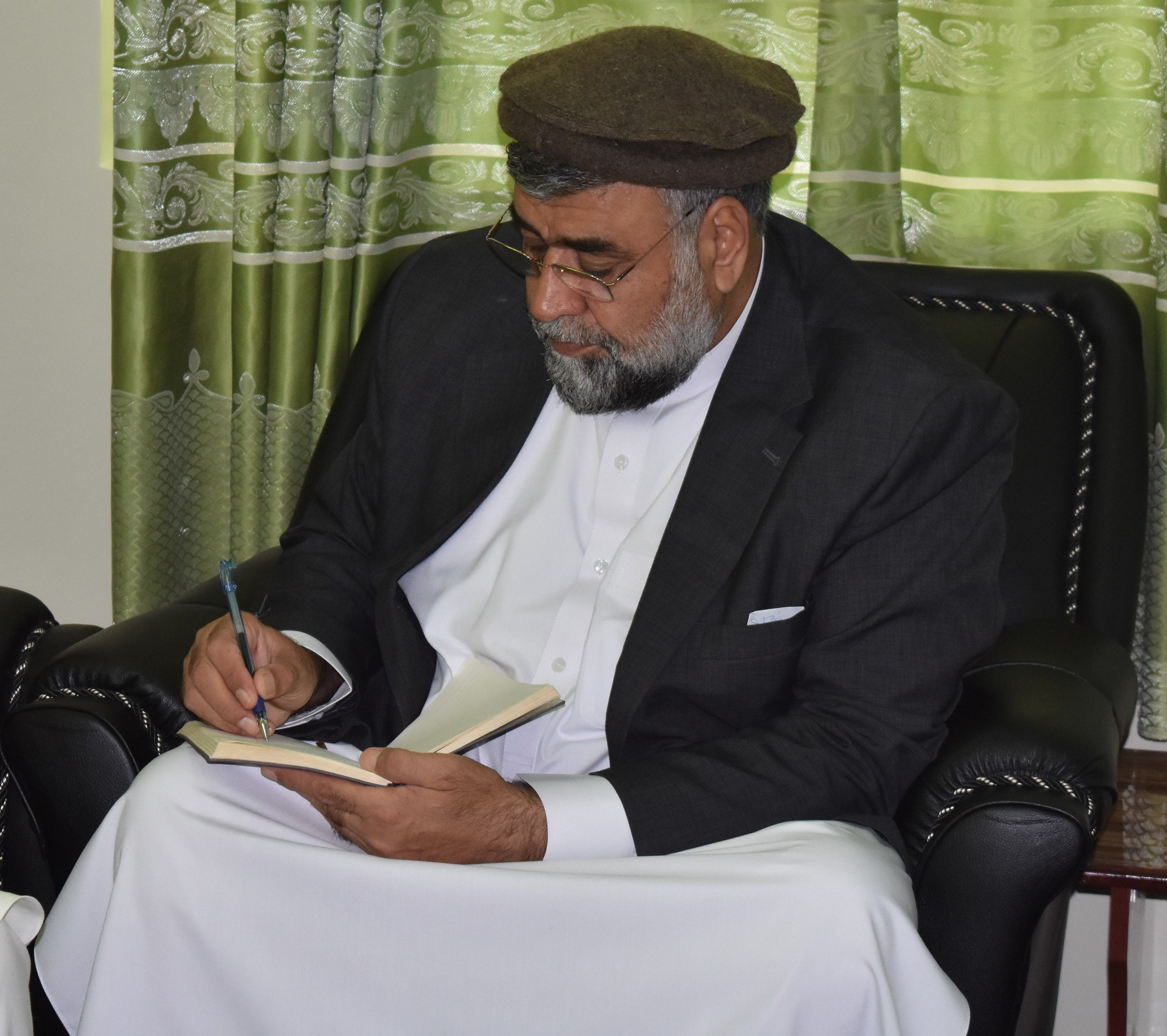

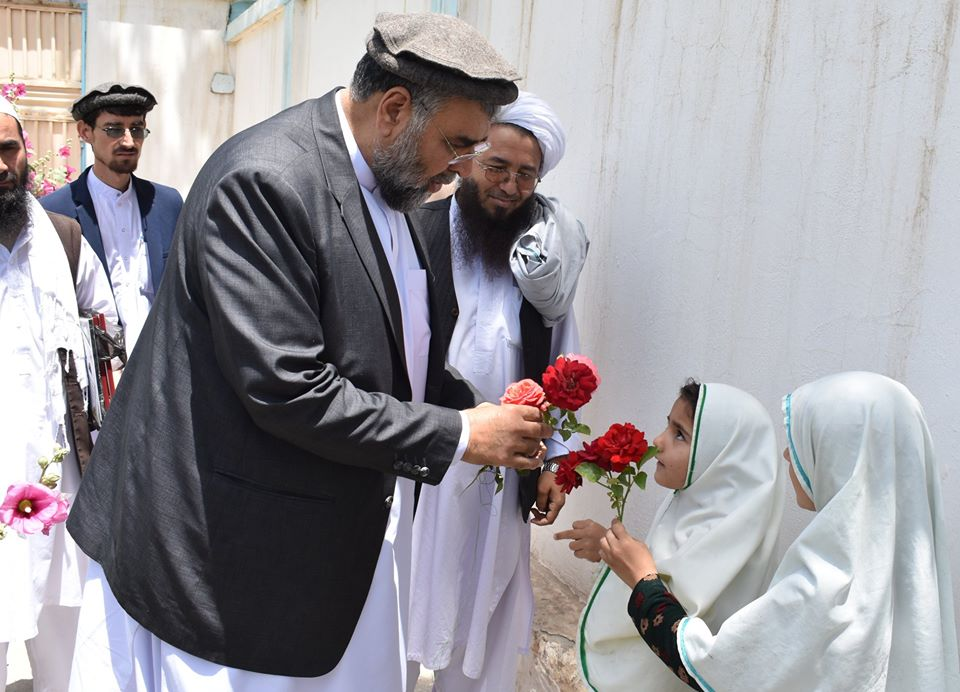

Preceded by None	Governor of Logar Province, Afghanistan; December 2001 – March 2004	Succeeded by Mohammad Aman Hamimi
