= List of governors of Khost =

This is a list of the governors of the province of Khost, Afghanistan.

== Governors of Khost Province ==
Governor	Period	Extra	Note
Abdul Baqi Haqqani	between 1996-2001	Under the IEA (1996-2001), in this period he has also served as Governor of Paktika	
Abdul Hakim Taniwal	29 March 2002-???		
Merajuddin Patan	April 2004-????		
Arsala Jamal	August 2006 – 2008		
Hamidullah Qalandarzai	2008; September 2009		
Tahir Khan Sabari (acting)	September 2009; March 2010		
Abdul Jabbar Naeemi	March 2010; Unknown		
Mohammad Sadiq Patman	7 July 2020 ??		
Mohmand Katawazai			
Mohammad Nabi Omari	August 2021; Present		

== See also ==
- List of current governors of Afghanistan
