= Sayed Abdul Karim Hashimi =

Afghan politician

Sayed Abdul Karim Hashimi سید عبدالکریم هاشمی

Governor of Logar Province
- In office December 2005 – July 2007
- Preceded by: Mohammad Aman Hamimi
- Succeeded by: Abdullah Wardak

Sayed Abdul Karim Hashimi is an Afghan politician. He is a former Governor of Logar Province, he served from December 2005 to July 2007.

Preceded by Mohammad Aman Hamimi	Governor of Logar Province, Afghanistan; December 2005 – July 2007	Succeeded by Abdullah Wardak
