= Mohammad Akram Khpalwāk =

Afghan Politician

Mohammad Akram Khpalwak
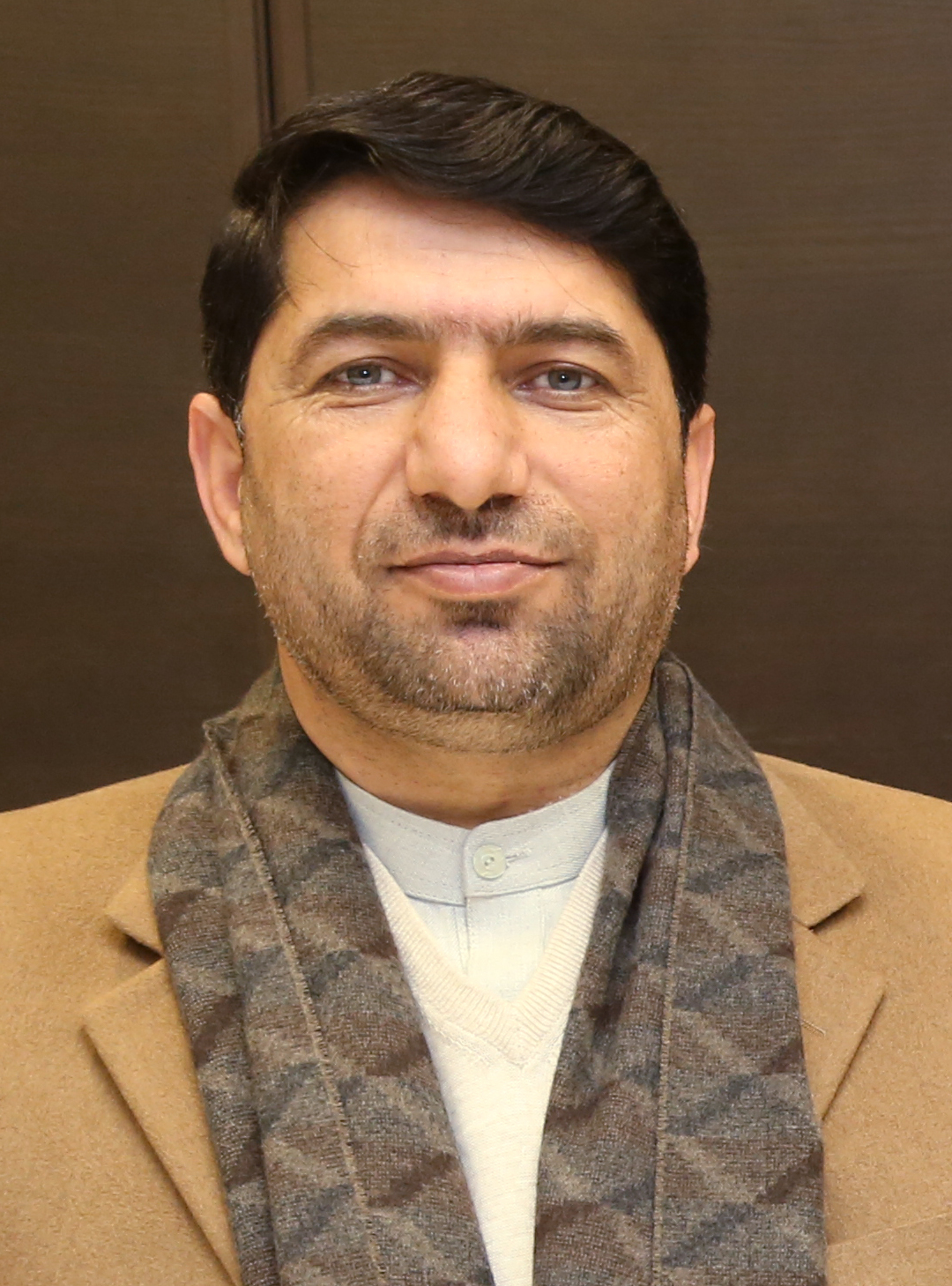
- Khpalwāk in 2018

Governor of Farah, Afghanistan
- In office 3 April 2012 – 1 December 2014
- Preceded by: Roohul Amin
- Succeeded by: Muhammad Omar Shirzad

Governor of Paktika, Afghanistan
- In office March 15, 2006 – April 20, 2010
- Preceded by: Gulab Mangal
- Succeeded by: Mohibullah Samim

Personal details
- Born: Afghanistan

Mohammad Akram Khpalwāk (Pashto: محمد اکرم خپلواک) is a politician in Afghanistan who was Governor of Farah province from 3 April 2012 to 1 December 2014. Between March 2006 and April 2010, he served as Governor of Paktika province.

Khpalwak attended the Kabul University Medical School. He became a leader of the Afghanistan Youth Society. He was appointed a representative of the Loya Jirga, the appointed body that drafted the new constitution prior to the first elections to the new Wolesi Jirga. He ran for a seat in the Wolesi Jirga, but earned only a small fraction of the popular vote. In April 2017, Khpalwak succeeded the recently deceased Ahmed Gailani as chairman of the Afghan High Peace Council.

Preceded by Roohul Amin	Governor of Farah; 3 April 2012 – 1 December 2014	Succeeded by Muhammad Omar Shirzad
Preceded by Gulab Mangal	Governor of Paktika; 15 March 2006 – 20 April 2010	Succeeded by Mohibullah Samim
