= List of governors of Farah =

This is a list of the governors of the province of Farah, Afghanistan.

== Governors of Farah Province ==
Governor	Period	Extra	Note
Abdul Hai Neamati	- February 2004		First governor installed after the fall of the Taliban
Bashir Baghlani	February 2004; Summer 2004		Replaced Abdul Hai
Assadollah Falah	Summer 2004; 23 March 2005		
Izzatullah Wasifi	March 2005; 30 August 2006		Was a governor on 2 June 2006.
Abdul Ahmad Stanikzai	30 August 2006; January 2007		
Mohayoddin Baluch	January 2007; May 2008		
Roohul Amin	May 2008; 3 April 2012		
Mohammad Akram Khpalwak	3 April 2012; 1 December 2014		
Muhammad Omar Shirzad	2014; 2015		
Mohammad Asif Nang	22 January 2015		
Muhammad Arif Shah Jahan	2017; January 28, 2018		
Abdul Basir Salangi	January 28, 2018 ?		
Taj Mohammad Safi	? ?		
Hizbullah Afghan	August 2021; 6 November 2021		
Noor Mohammad Rohani	7 November 2021; Present		

== See also ==
- List of current governors of Afghanistan
