= Naeem Baloch =

Afghan politician

Naeem Baloch نعيم بلوڅ
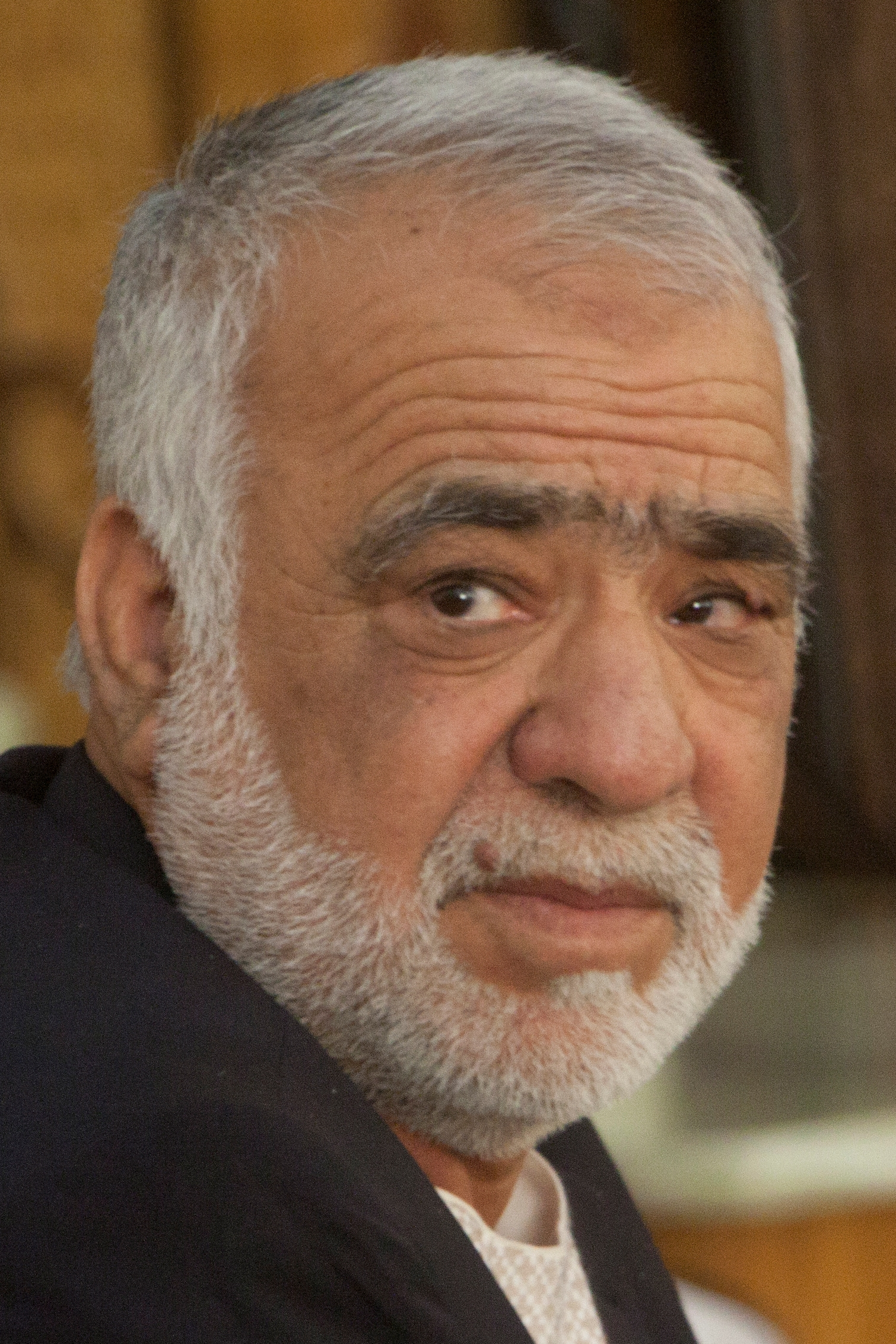

Governor of Helmand Province
- In office 27 April 2012 – 2015
- Succeeded by: Mirza Khan Rahimi

Personal details
- Born: Helmand, Afghanistan
- Party: Independent
- Education: Helmand University
- Profession: Political

Naeem Baloch served as the governor of the Helmand Province in Afghanistan from 2012 until 2015. Prior to that, he worked as an Afghan intelligence officer in the Helmand Province.

Political offices
Preceded by Mohammad Gulab Mangal	Governor of Helmand Province, Afghanistan; 2012-2015	Succeeded by Mirza Khan Rahimi
