= Bashir Baghlani =

Afghan politician (1931–2007)

Governor of Farah, Afghanistan
- In office February 2004 – Summer 2004
- Preceded by: Abdul Hai Neamati
- Succeeded by: Asadullah Falah

Personal details
- Born: 1931
- Died: 28 April 2007 (aged 75–76)
- Party: Hezbi Islami

Bashir Baghlani (1931–2007), born Mohammad Yousuf, was a politician in Afghanistan affiliated with a variety of factions throughout the 1980s, 1990s, and 2000s, who filled such positions as Governor of Baghlan Province and later Farah Province.

== Early life ==
Baghlani was born in 1931, the son of an immigrant from Tajikistan who had been a chairman of a kolkhoz in that country.

== Political career ==
In the early 1980s, Baghlani was affiliated with the leftist militant group Settam-e-Melli. He served as governor of Baghlan Province and was a member of the Hezb-e Islami Gulbuddin. Baghlani, previously a key Taliban ally in Baghlan, was arrested by the Taliban government on 27 July 2000, accused of making deals with the Northern Alliance.

After the fall of the Taliban, Baghlani replaced Abdul Hai Neamati as Governor of Farah Province in 2002.

Baghlani died of a heart attack on 28 April 2007.

== Name ==
He took the name of Mohammed Bashir Baghlani when he was appointed Minister of Justice under Babrak Karmal's Presidency in the 1980s.

Preceded by Abdul Hai Neamati	Governor of Farah, Afghanistan; 2004–2004	Succeeded by Asadullah Falah
