= Izzatullah Wasifi =

Afghanistani politician (born 1958)

Ezatullah Wasifi

Governor of Farah, Afghanistan
- In office March 2005 – August 2006
- Preceded by: Asadullah Falah
- Succeeded by: Abdul Ahmad Stanikzai

Personal details
- Born: 15-7-1958

Izzatullah (Ezatullah, Ezzatullah) Wasifi (b. July 15, 1958) is a politician in Afghanistan. He served as the chief of General Independent Administration of Anti Corruption since January 2007. As anti-corruption chief Wasifi leads an 84-person staff. Part of their responsibility is addressing Afghanistan's problems with opium.

== Early life ==
Wasifi is reported to have been a childhood friend of the President Hamid Karzai. His father, Azizullah Wasifi, was the Minister of Agriculture under King Mohammed Zahir Shah. He belongs to the Alakozai tribe of Pashtun group. Wasifi earned a degree from the Punjab Agricultural University in India.

== Life in the United States ==
Wasifi's family left Afghanistan after the Soviet invasion in 1979. They lived in Pakistan for a short time and around 1983 immigrated to the United States. Wasifi's first job in there was working as a waiter in a restaurant in Maryland, which happens to be owned by Qayum Karzai, Hamid Karzai's brother.

== Drug conviction ==
Wasifi served three years and eight months in a prison after a drug conviction in Las Vegas, Nevada, in 1987. He acknowledged the conviction, but disputed the circumstances.

According to the Associated Press a: "...review of criminal records in Nevada and California revealed that the 48-year-old Wasifi was arrested at Caesars Palace on July 15, 1987, for selling 650 grams (23 ounces) of heroin." The Associated Press reported that he had tried to sell 650 grams of heroin to and undercover detective for $65,000. The drugs had a street value of US$2 million. His ex-wife, Fereshteh Behbahani, who now works for California Environmental Protection Agency and lives in Los Angeles, was sentenced to three years' probation.

Wasifi acknowledged that he was arrested on July 15, 1987, his 29th birthday. According to his account he and his wife were on their honeymoon. According to his account his wife had purchased some cocaine in the hotel bar—an amount for personal use, and the pair were arrested when she returned to their hotel room.

Wasifi suggested that his drug use was a youthful indiscretion that should mar his later political career than the youthful drug use of United States President George W. Bush.

"Even George Bush has a record. He was arrested, same shit as me. There’s no difference between him and me."

The appeal Wasifi filed with the Parole Board offered a third account. In his appeal American drug enforcement officials agreed to release Wasif and Behbahani, without charge, if they lead them to higher-level drug dealers. USA Today reported:

According to Wasifi's written plea at his appeal, police had wanted him to work undercover for them, and they freed the couple without any type of bond after their initial arrest.

Wasifi told his Parole Board he could not find his original dealer and that he: "...did not know anyone in the drug underworld." He further said he was unaware that he had been indicted in September 1987, two months after his initial arrest and release, and had not been attempting to flee when they were arrested for "unlawful flight" in March 1988. He and his wife Behbahani were arrested for "unlawful flight".

== Pizza franchise owner ==
Between 1994 and 1999 Wasifi and his brother Bashir owned a franchise of Ameci Pizza & Pasta.

== Return to Afghanistan ==
Wasifi returned to Afghanistan in 2001, following the Taliban's ouster.

== Governor of Farah Province ==
Karzai appointed Wasifi the Governor of Farah Province. Accounts from Western officials generally agree that his leadership was ineffective. He made no real efforts to control Afghanistan's poppy harvest in his province.

== Appointment to head the General Independent Administration of Anti Corruption ==
Karzai appointed Wasifi to head the General Independent Administration of Anti Corruption in March 2007. The appointment raised some controversy, because of the twenty-year-old US drug conviction.

Preceded by Asadullah Falah	Governor of Farah, Afghanistan; 2005– 2006	Succeeded by Abdul Ahmad Stanikzai
