= Mohammad Agha District =

Mohammad Agha District د محمد آغه ولسوالی
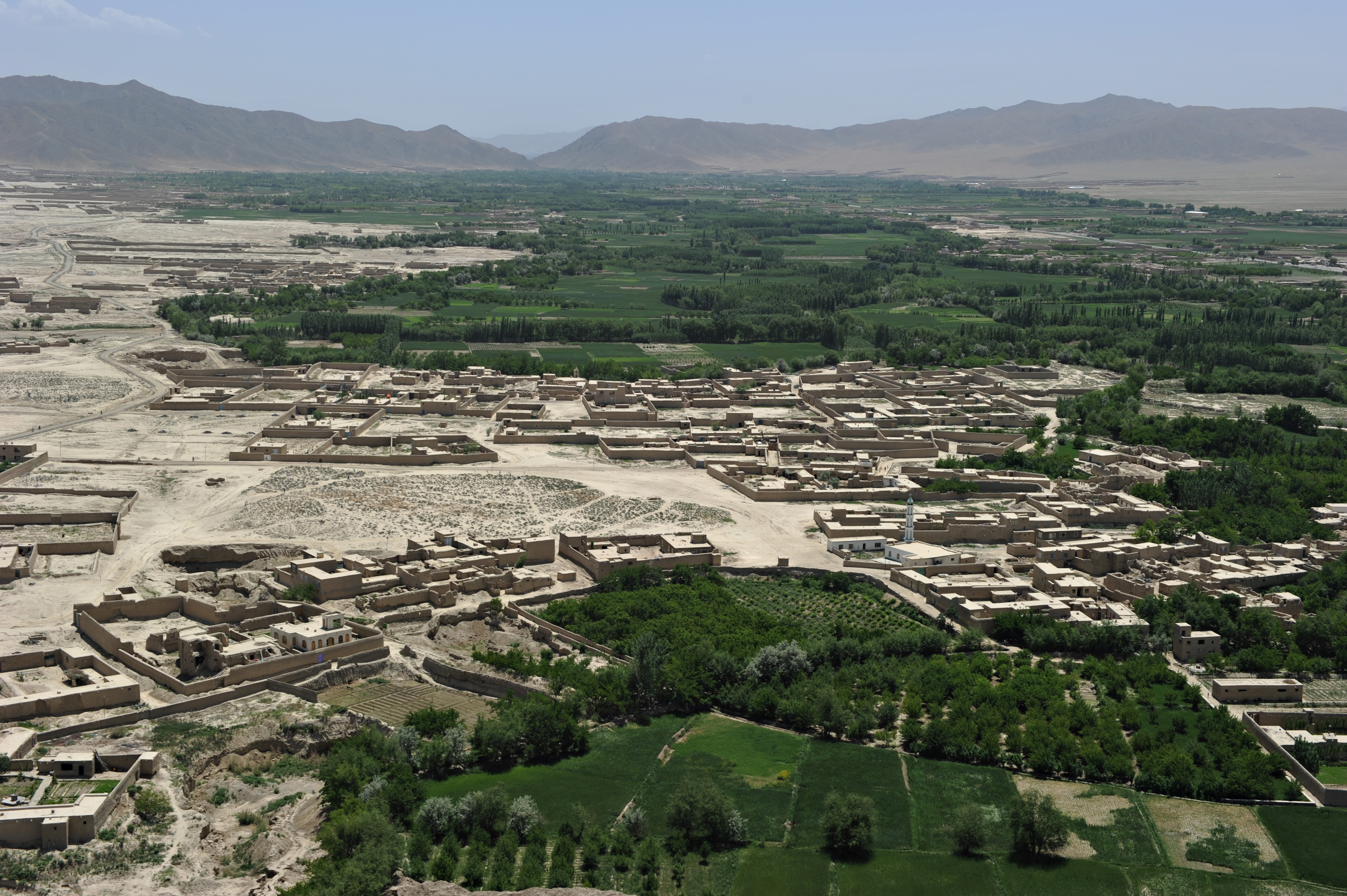
- An aerial view of Mohammad Agha District, Logar Province

- Location in Afghanistan
- Coordinates: 34°10′36″N 69°13′16″E
- Country: Afghanistan
- Province: Logar Province
- District: Mohammad Agha District

Population (1990)
  - Total: 57,690
- Time zone: UTC+4:30 (IRST)
  - Summer (DST): UTC+5:30 (IRDT)

Mohammad Agha District (Pashto: د محمد اغه ولسوالی) is a district of Logar Province, Afghanistan. It lies just south of Kabul Province. The district capital is Mohammad Agha. The Afghan government plans to build a new international airport in this district.

== Geography ==
Mohammad Agha district is located in the northern part of Logar Province, 35 km from Kabul City or a one-hour drive, at an altitude of 1,875 mt.

The District consists of 18 Zones ( Zarghun Shar, Deh Naw, Moghol Khail, Qala Shekhak, Qala Ahmad Zai, Mohammad Agha, Zayed Abad, Safed Sang, Kotubkhel, Gomaran, Abbazak, Surkh Abad, Dewalak, Surkhab, Burg, Abparan, Dashtak and Karezes), 8 main villages and 15 sub-villages.

== Demographics ==
As of 1990 Ethnic Pashtuns form about 60% of the district's population with the remaining 40% being Tajiks.

== Education ==
Zarghun Shar is the largest village with 80% male educated and 40% female educated. The famous high schools are Zarghun Shar High School, Mohammad Agha High School, Deh Naw High School Emal Khan Baba High School All the government schools in the district are taught in the Pashto language primarily with a subject in Persian. It has been this way for decades since the majority of the population are Pashtuns. The private schools now that are being built in the province vary in the main language taught.

== Political issues and security ==
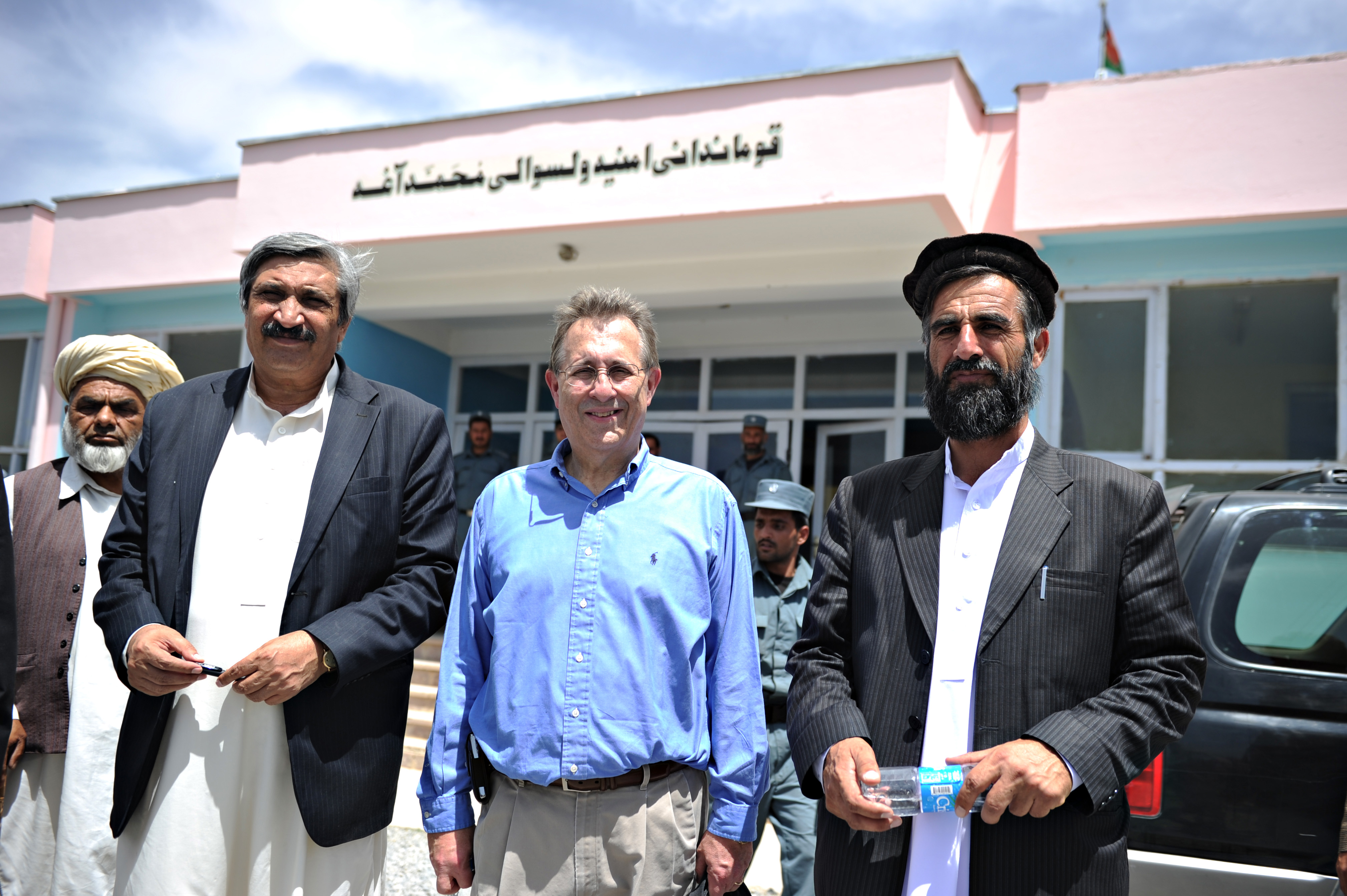
From left to right: Atiqullah Ludin, Gover of Logar province; and property village is pacha saheb Deputy U.S. Ambassador Earl Anthony Wayne; Hammid, the district governor of Mohammad Agha.

Mohammad Agha has been severely affected by conflict, mainly during the 1980s Soviet–Afghan War. Around 85% of its houses have been destroyed and a large-scale displacement took place. Many refugees returned at the beginning of the 1990s, but were again displaced by the fighting between the Mujaheddin and later on between the Taliban and the Jamiat Party.

In November 2009 a bomb facilitator was captured by ISAF team in Qal' eh-ye Shayhee along with several other suspected militants.

== See also ==
- Districts of Afghanistan
