= Abdullah Mukhtar =

Governor of Paktika Province

- Pashto: مولوي عبدالله مختار

Governor of Paktika
- Incumbent
- Assumed office 7 November 2021
- Prime Minister: Hasan Akhund
- Emir: Hibatullah Akhundzada
- Preceded by: Muhammad Isa Yaseen

Maulvi Abdullah Mukhtar (Pashto: مولوي عبدالله مختار) is an Afghan Taliban politician who is currently serving as Governor of Paktika Province since 7 November 2021.
