= Mohammad Tamim Nuristani =

Afghan politician, businessman (born 1962)

Mohammad Tamim Nuristani محمد تمیم نورستاني

Governor of Nuristan Province, Afghanistan
- In office 4 August 2006 – 10 July 2008
- Preceded by: Maulawi Abdullah Shergul
- Succeeded by: Hazrat Din Noor
- In office 4 September 2011 – 4 February 2014
- Preceded by: Jamaluddin Badr
- Succeeded by: Hafiz Abdul Qayum

Personal details
- Born: 1962 (age 63–64) Nuristan, Afghanistan

Mohammad Tamim Nuristani (Pashto: محمد تمیم نورستاني) is a businessman and politician from Nuristan Province of Afghanistan. Mohammad Tamim was the previous governor of Nuristan Province and replaced by Hafiz Abdul Qayyum.

Nuristani studied in Germany and later worked in the restaurant business in Brooklyn and California. He is a member of the Kata tribe.
