= Abdul Hai Neamati =

Afghan politician

Governor of Farah, Afghanistan
- In office 2002 – February 2004
- Preceded by: Taliban
- Succeeded by: Bashir Baghlani

Personal details
- Party: Jamiat-e Islami

Abdul Hai Neamati is a politician in Afghanistan who served as the first Governor of Farah Province after the Taliban government was ousted in late 2001. He was an ally of Ismail Khan and a member of the Jamiat-e Islami party.

Preceded by Taliban -	Governor of Farah, Afghanistan; 2002 – 2004	Succeeded by Bashir Baghlani
