= Muhammad Amin Jan =

Afghan Taliban politician

Haji Muhammad Amin Jan Kuchi
- Pashto: حاجي محمد امین جان کوچی

Governor of Ghanzni
- Incumbent
- Assumed office 7 April 2023
- Prime Minister: Hasan Akhund
- Emir: Hibatullah Akhundzada
- Preceded by: Rahimullah Mahmood

Haji Muhammad Amin Jan Kuchi (Pashto: حاجي محمد امین جان کوچی) is an Afghan Taliban politician who is currently serving as Governor of Ghazni Province since 7 April 2023.
