= Shah Mahmood Safi =

Afghan politician

Shah Mahmood Safi was the Governor of Laghman in Laghman Province located in eastern Afghanistan.
