= Mohibullah Samim =

Governor of Paktika, Afghanistan

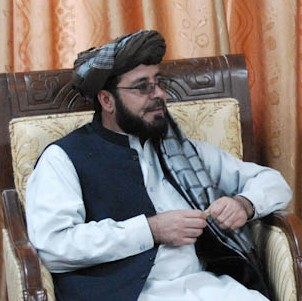
- Mohibullah Samim in 2010

Personal details
- Born: 1965 (age 60–61) Waghaz District, Ghazni Province, Afghanistan

Mohibullah Samim (born 1965) is a politician with a diverse background. He holds a master’s degree in International Relations, complementing his bachelor’s degree in linguistics. Before the Taliban takeover in Kabul, Afghanistan, he served as the Minister of Borders and Tribal Affairs. On 20 April 2010, he assumed the role of Governor of Paktika.

Samim, an ethnic Pashtun born in the Waghaz district of southern Ghazni province, has contributed to various roles, including director of information and culture in Ghazni province and sub-governor in two districts of Ghazni province.

In a message to the Taliban, he advocated for dialogue and unity, expressing his commitment to working for the well-being of the people of Paktika province.

Preceded by Mohammad Akram Khpalwak	Governor of Paktika; 14 September 2020 – present	Succeeded by Incumbent
