= Mohammad Aman Hamimi =

Mohammad Aman Hamimi محمد امان حمیمی

Governor of Logar Province
- In office March 2004 – December 2005
- Preceded by: Fazlullah Mojadeddi
- Succeeded by: Sayed Abdul Karim Hashimi

Mohammad Amam Hamimi is a former Governor of Logar Province in Afghanistan. He was governor from 10 March 2004 to December 2005. He was succeeded by Abdul Karim Matin as Ghazni governor in 2016.

Preceded by Fazlullah Mojadeddi	Governor of Logar Province, Afghanistan; March 2004 – December 2005	Succeeded by Sayed Abdul Karim Hashimi
