= Hamidullah Qalandarzai =

Afghan politician

Governor of Khost, Afghanistan
- In office 2008 – September 2009
- Preceded by: Arsala Jamal
- Succeeded by: Tahir Khan Sabari (acting)

Personal details
- Born: Surkh-Rōd District, Nangarhar Province

Hamidullah Qalandarzai (Pashto: حمیدالله قلندرزی) was born in Surkh Rod district of Nangarhar Province, Afghanistan. He is the former governor of Khost Province, replacing Arsala Jamal.

== Early life ==
Qalandarzai was born to an ethnic Pashtun family and completed his primary education at Rahimi Primary School in Surkh Rod district of Nangarhar. In 1984, he graduated from Nangarhar High School. In the same year he was admitted to the Faculty of Engineering of Nangarhar University and graduated with a degree in engineering in 1989.

== Work life ==
- 1989 up to 1992 he was a professor in the Faculty of Engineering at Nangarhar University.
- From December 1992 he worked with the Afghan Development Association (ADA) in different position and different location of Afghanistan.
- May 2000 up to March 2004 he worked as a regional manager with ADA in southern and northern regional offices.
- Hamidullah was appointed as the Deputy Minister of Administration with the Ministry of Communications in Kabul on 20 March 2005.
- 2008/2009, he was appointed as the governor of Khost Province.
