= Lutfullah Mashal =

Afghan politician (born 1971)

Lutfullah Mashal لطف الله مشعل
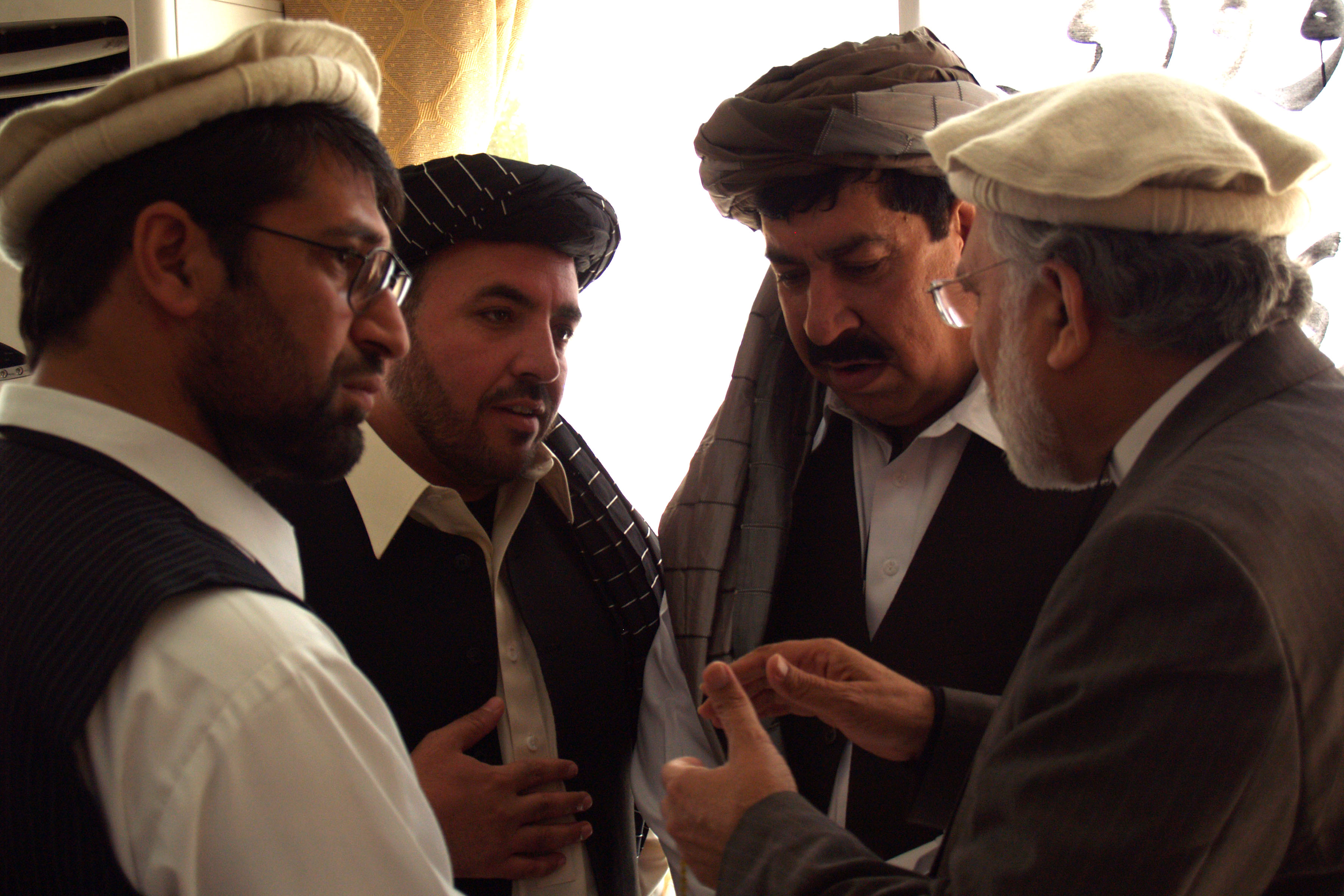
- Lutfullah Mashal (second from left with turban) in 2009

Governor of Laghman
- In office 22 March 2008 – 18 March 2010
- Preceded by: Gulab Mangal
- Succeeded by: Mohammad Iqbal Azizi

Personal details
- Born: 1971 (age 54–55) Kabul, Afghanistan

Lutfullah Mashal (Pashto: لطف الله مشعل) is a politician in Afghanistan who last served as spokesman for the National Directorate of Security (NDS). Prior to that he was Governor of Laghman province. He is also a writer and a poet.

== Biography ==
Lutfullah Mashal was born in the Shah Shaheed area of Kabul city on 1971. He graduated from the University of Peshawar in 1994 with a master's degree in English literature.

From 2003 to 2005, Mashal served as a senior spokesperson and adviser in the Ministry of the Interior. After receiving a scholarship from Kent University, he moved to Britain where he obtained a master's degree in Political Science and International Conflict Analysis. He is the author of several books in Pashto and English and was a reporter for the American newspaper The Christian Science Monitor from 2001 to 2002. Mashal has also appeared on major news channels reporting/discussing terrorism, taliban and radical insurgents in Afghanistan/south Asia. Mashal has written extensively on Al-Qaeda and the emergence of Taliban and radical Islamist groups in Afghanistan. He has also researched on the drugs factor in the conflict of Afghanistan.

Mashal was governor of the Laghman province from 2008 to 2010 and was replaced by Mohammad Iqbal Azizi. In 2011, he was appointed as Spokesperson and Special Assistant to the DG of the National Directorate of Security of Afghanistan NDS.

== Books ==
- "De Lmar Pa Latoon" - د لمر په لټون
- The Drugs Factor in the Conflict of Afghanistan
