= List of governors of Paktika =

This is a list of the governors of the province of Paktika, Afghanistan.

| Governor | Term | References |
|---|---|---|
| Abdul Baqi Haqqani | 1996–2001 | (Note: Under the IEA (1996-2001), in this period he has also served as Governor of Khost) |
| Mohammad Ali Jalali | 2002– 2004 | |
| Mohammad Gulab Mangal | 2004–2006 | |
| Mohammad Akram Khpalwak | March 2006 – 2009 | |
| Abdul Qayum Katawazi | January 2009 – 2010 | |
| Mohibullah Samim | 21 April 2010 – 22 December 2014 | |
| Abdul Karim Matin | 22 December 2014 – 24 August 2021 | |
| Muhammad Isa Yaseen | 24 August 2021 – 7 November 2021 | |
| Abdullah Mukhtar | 7 November 2021 – | |

== See also ==
- List of current governors of Afghanistan
