= Zarkashan Mine =

Mine in Ghazni, Afghanistan

Zarakshan Mine
- Zarakshan Mine
- Coordinates: 32°54′11″N 67°41′55.2″E
- Country: Afghanistan
- Province: Ghazni Province
- District: Gelan District
- Elevation: 6,506 ft (1,983 m)

Zarkashan is a mine located approximately 225 km south-west of Kabul in the Ghazni Province, Afghanistan. Ghazni city is approximately 93 km north of the project area. The German Geological survey conducted a reconnaissance survey in the mid-1960s and the Soviets and the Afghanistan Geological Survey (AGS) conducted exploration in the late 1960s and early 1970s. The mine is estimated to contain up to 7500 kilograms of gold.

Recently the USGS assessment of the mineral potential in Afghanistan included ongoing compilation of historic German and Soviet mapping, geophysics data, drilling, and sampling data, and incorporation into a GIS database using Esri products. There are many ancient open pits and underground workings that show that this area has been mined in the past. The grades obtained by the Soviet and AGS exploration team show that the skarn mineralization has a core of relatively high gold grades with a halo of lower grades. Four borehole lines were collected by Soviet geologists along the main channel of the Zarkashan River and initial results suggested deposits containing up to 500 mg per cubic meter.

Road access to the site from Kabul is on Highway A01, which is a paved highway. Power can potentially be brought in from the nearby grid at Ghazni, or from a dedicated self-supplied source.
