= Abdullah Wardak =

Afghan politician (1954/55–2008)

Abdullah Wardak عبدالله وردک
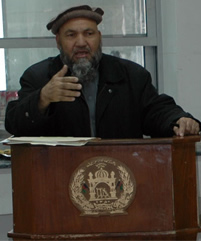
- Abdullah Wardak speaks to the newest police graduates during a graduation ceremony. ( 21 February 2008 forward operating base Shank, Afghanistan.)

Governor of Logar Province, Afghanistan
- In office 19 July 2007 – 13 September 2008
- Preceded by: Sayed Abdul Karim Hashimi
- Succeeded by: Atiqullah Ludin

Personal details
- Born: 1954 or 1955 Saydabad District, Maidan Wardak Province, Kingdom of Afghanistan
- Died: 13 September 2008 Paghman, Kabul Province, Islamic Republic of Afghanistan

Mohammad Jan Abdullah Wardak (1954 or 1955 – 13 September 2008) was an Afghan politician and former Mujahideen commander. He served as a government minister and Governor of Logar Province.

== Early life and biography ==
Abdullah Wardak, an ethnic Pashtun, was born in 1954 or 1955 in Saydabad District, Maidan Wardak Province, Afghanistan.

During the Soviet occupation of Afghanistan he fought as a Mujahideen. He was aligned with Abdul Rasul Sayyaf's Islamic Union for the liberation of Afghanistan party. When the Taliban came to power he fought against them as part of the Northern Alliance. He fought alongside the American forces in 2001, helping to overthrow the Taliban regime.

In December 2001, following the Bonn Agreement, Abdullah Wardak was appointed Minister of Martyrs and Disabled in the Afghan Transitional Administration of Hamid Karzai. He held the position until a new cabinet was selected in December 2004, following the presidential election. In July 2007 he was appointed Governor of Logar Province, replacing Sayed Abdul Karim Hashimi, who was perceived as being ineffective on counter-insurgency measures.

In January 2005 Abdullah Wardak visited Evansville, Indiana and spoke at the Bethel Temple Community Church. He spoke about the war in Afghanistan and how he was helping the church to open a school, an orphanage and a home for widows in Kabul. He received the key to the city from Mayor Jonathan Weinzapfel.

== Assassination ==
On the morning of 13 September 2008 Abdullah Wardak left his residence in Paghman, Kabul Province and was being driven to his office. His vehicle was targeted in a remote control mine detonation while crossing a dry riverbed. The car was destroyed and Abdullah Wardak, his driver and two bodyguards were killed. The attack happened around 08:00 local time, approximately 300 yards from Abdullah Wardak's home. Taliban spokesman Zabiullah Mujahid said the bomb had been remotely detonated by two Taliban insurgents.
Abdullah Wardak was the second provincial Governor to be assassinated by the Taliban. The first was the Governor of Paktia Province, Hakim Taniwal in September 2006.
President Hamid Karzai condemned the assassination by "terrorists" and was said to be "deeply saddened" he described Abdullah Wardak as a "true son of Afghanistan". Zemarai Bashary a spokesman for the Interior ministry said "The Governor has been martyred".

On 14 September 2008 Abdullah Wardak's funeral was held at the mosque in Pajak village, Paghman District, he was buried in the grounds of his home. The funeral was held amid tight security and attended by government officials and members of the United National Front.

Preceded by Sayed Abdul Karim Hashimi	Governor of Logar Province, Afghanistan; July 2007 – September 2008	Succeeded by Atiqullah Ludin
