= Zain-Ul-Abideen =

Governor of Laghman Province

Qari Zain-Ul-Abideen Abid
- Pashto: قاري زین العابدین

Governor of Laghman
- Incumbent
- Assumed office August 2021
- Prime Minister: Hasan Akhund
- Emir: Hibatullah Akhundzada
- Preceded by: Abdul Wali Wahidzai

Qari Zain-Ul-Abideen (Pashto: قاري زین العابدین) is an Afghan Taliban militant commander who has been Governor of Laghman province in the internationally unrecognized Taliban regime since August 2021.
