= Aynak =

Coordinates: 34°15′58″N 69°18′18″E

Aynak (Pashto: عینک) is a place in Afghanistan's Logar province, about 30 km south-southeast of Kabul. It is the site of a large copper deposit.

== See also ==
- Mes Aynak
