= Mohammad Halim Fidai =

Afghan politician, activist and journalist

- Born: December 28, 1970 (age 55); Sharana, Paktika Province, Kingdom of Afghanistan

Mohammad Halim Fidai is an Afghan politician, civil society activist and a prominent journalist. He was a Governor of Paktia Province beginning in July 2020, and was previously governor of Khost, Logar, and Wardak. Fidai is an independent politician, and when first appointed governor of Wardak in 2008 he was the youngest of the 34 governors of Afghanistan.

After the fall of Kabul on August 15, 2021, Fidai was evacuated by NATO and he is now living as an immigrant and is an exile in Germany with his family.

The Spiegel Magazine has recently profiled him and had a detailed and comprehensive interview with him while he is in Germany.

He is the prominent opponent of the current Taliban regime and is highly critical of their policies.
