= Teshkan =

Teshkan may refer to:

- Teshkan, Afghanistan
- Teshkan Bridge, bridge across the Kokcha River, Afghanistan
- Teşkan, Azerbaijan
- Teshkan Rural District, Iran
