= 2014 Badakhshan mudslides =

Mudslides in Afghanistan

- Location of Badakhshan Province in Afghanistan
- Date: 2 May 2014 (UTC+04:30)
- Location: Argo District, Badakhshan Province, Afghanistan; 37°00′57″N 70°21′50″E
- Deaths: 350 (UN mission in Afghanistan); 2,100 (Governor of Badakhshan, Shah Waliullah Adeeb); 2,700 (International Organization for Migration)

On 2 May 2014, a pair of mudslides occurred in Argo District, Badakhshan Province, Afghanistan. The death toll is uncertain, the number of deaths is believed to be at least 350 and no more than 2,700. Around 300 houses were buried and over 14,000 were affected. Rescuers responding to the initial mudslide were struck by a second mudslide, which further hampered rescue efforts.

== Mudslide ==
On 2 May, there were two mudslides in the Argo District of Badakhshan Province, Afghanistan, occurring on the side of a mountain; affecting the village of Aab Barik/Hobo Barik. The initial mudslide struck between 11:00 and 13:00. It occurred on a Friday, a day of worship in Afghanistan when many families would have been at home rather than work. Fellow villagers tried to rescue those stuck after the primary mudslide, but a second mudslide occurred which trapped or killed a "large proportion" of potential rescuers. The consecutive slides "levelled" the village, and left the area under 10 to 30 metres (33 to 98 ft) of mud. A week before the mudslides, there had been torrential rain and flooding in northern Afghanistan. There was a risk of further mudslides.

== Casualties ==
The mudslides affected 1000 houses and buried 300, about one-third of all the houses in the village, under "thousands of tons of soil and rocks", which formed "a wave of mud that destroyed everything in its path".

Initial reports said 350 people were killed and 2,500 were missing. After the scope of the disaster became clear, the death toll was increased to an estimated 2,100 the next day by Badakhshan government officials. However, Gul Mohammad Bedar, the deputy provincial governor of Badakhshan, later said: "The first figure that we announced was obtained from local people, not from our technical team. We think the death toll will not rise beyond 500." The UN said that 350 were confirmed dead and it was unlikely to find more bodies due to the "catastrophic nature" of the mudslide.

== Rescue efforts ==
A company of Afghan military soldiers was sent to the region to assist rescuers, and the American-led coalition in Afghanistan said they were "ready to support if requested". Another nearby village was evacuated after fears of further mudslides. Rescue workers lacked some necessary equipment, hampering their work. The fear of a third landslide also hampered the rescue team operation. Rescue operations were discontinued May 4 with officials citing safety concerns, and the lack of equipment, but were resumed after relatives complained about the government's decision to halt the operation.

== Reactions ==
The governor of Badakhshan Province said that the mudslides were "massive and it's beyond human ability to take all the dead bodies out [...] This is a disaster and a tragedy". He further stated that clearing out the bodies would be impossible so the site should be left as a mass grave. He also appealed for more shovels to dig people out.

Afghan President Hamid Karzai stated that he is "deeply saddened by the loss of lives and financial damage". U.S. President Barack Obama said: "Our thoughts are with the people of Afghanistan who are facing a terrible tragedy [...] We stand ready to help our Afghan partners to face this disaster".

A memorial ceremony took place on 3 May 2014.
