= Ḥazrat-e Saʽid =

Ḥazrat-e Saʽid Ḩaẕrat-e Saʽīd
- Location in Afghanistan
- Coordinates: 36°27′53″N 70°46′27″E
- Country: Afghanistan
- Province: Badakhshan Province
- District: Yamgan
- Time zone: + 4.30

Ḥazrat-e Saʽid is a village in Badakhshan Province in north-eastern Afghanistan. It is located on the Kokcha River and is on the road to Jurm, about ten miles north of Garghamu.
