= Nasir Khusraw =

11th-century Persian Isma'ili poet, scholar, philosopher, and missionary

- ناصرخسرو
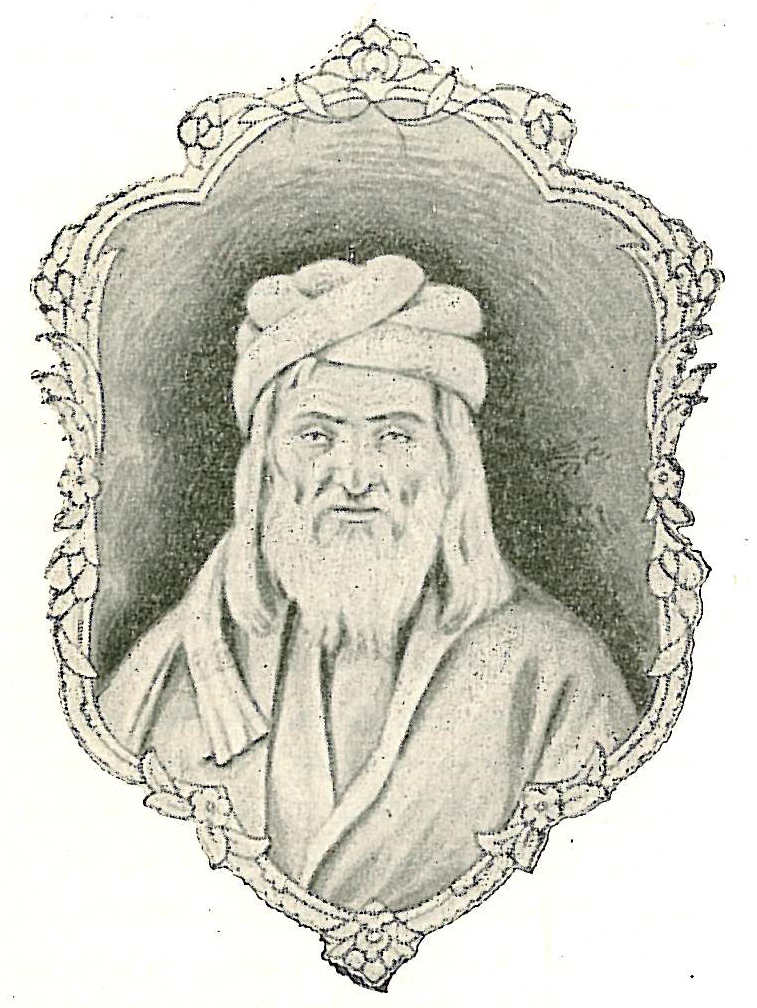
- Depiction by Abbas Rassam Arjangi, 1961
- Title: Proof (ḥujja) of Khurasan

Personal life
- Born: 1004 Qubadiyan, Khurasan, Ghaznavid Empire (present-day Tajikistan)
- Died: 1072–1088 Yumgan, Badakhshan (present-day Afghanistan)
- Resting place: Tomb of Nasir Khusraw Balkhi, Balkh, Afghanistan
- Notable work(s): Safarnama; Diwan

Religious life
- Religion: Isma'ili Shi'a Islam

Senior posting
- Teacher: Al-Mu'ayyad fi'l-Din al-Shirazi
- Influenced by: Al-Mu'ayyad fi'l-Din al-Shirazi Abu Ya'qub al-Sijistani
- Influenced: Isma'ilis of Badakhshan

Abu Mo'in Nasir ibn Khusraw ibn Harith Qubodiyani Balkhi, known as Nasir Khusraw (Persian: ناصرخسرو; 1004 – between 1072–1088), was an Persian-speaking Isma'ili poet, philosopher, traveler, and missionary (da'i and later Ḥujjah of Imam al-Mustansir Billah) for the Isma'ili Fatimid Caliphate. He was born in Qubodiyon, Khorasan and died in Yamgan, Badakhshan. His resting place is in Balkh, Afghanistan.

Despite being one of the most prominent Isma'ili philosophers and theologians of the Fatimids and the writer of many philosophical works intended for only the inner circle of the Isma'ili community, Nasir is best known to the general public as a poet and writer who ardently supported his native Persian tongue as an artistic and scientific language. All of Nasir's philosophical Isma'ili works are in Persian, a rarity in the Isma'ili literature of the Fatimids, which primarily used Arabic.

Nasir was a key figure in the spread of Isma'ilism in Central Asia. He is with great reverence called "Pir" or "Shah Sayyid Nasir" by the Isma'ili community of Badakhshan (split between Afghanistan and Tajikistan) and their branches in northern Pakistan, who all consider him to be their founder.

== Name ==
Nasir Khusraw's full name was Abu Mu'in Hamid al-Din Nasir ibn Khusraw ibn Harith al-Qubadiyani al-Marvazi, which he would generally refer to himself by in his prose philosophical works. In his book Safarnama, he mostly calls himself "Nasir", and in his poetry he mostly uses the pen-name "Hujjat", a title meaning "proof", which he had received by the Isma'ili missionary organisation in Cairo. In his poetry he also sometimes use the names of "Nasir" and "Khusraw", the latter being a Persian name, which according to historian Dr C. Alice Hunsberger "would certainly have been a point of great pride to this defender of Persian culture and language." His name is also transliterated as Nasir-i Khusraw and Naser-e Khosrow.

== Life ==
Nasir is the subject of many tales, including a fake autobiography that bears his name and has been passed around between Isma'ilis and non-Isma'ilis for many centuries. The writings of Nasir that are still in existence offer insightful information about his life and philosophy. Yet, it appears that the majority of these manuscripts were censored to remove any references to Isma'ilism by antagonistic Sunni scribes. A native Persian, Nasir was from a family of government bureaucrats and landowners. He most likely adhered to the Twelver Shi'ism form of Islam before his conversion to Isma'ilism. He was born in 1004 in Qubadiyan, a neighborhood of the city of Balkh, which was part of the Marw province in the Khurasan region. The area was then controlled by the Ghaznavids, a culturally Persianised dynasty of Turkic slave origin.

Nasir supposedly started his career as a scribe before moving to the city of Marw to work as a financial administrator. He was allowed entry to the court at Balkh until 1040, when Khurasan was conquered by the Seljuks. He retained his office under the Seljuks, whose co-founder Chaghri Beg ruled Khurasan. Around the age of 41, Nasir underwent a tremendous and sudden change in his spirituality, which drastically altered the direction of his life. According to Nasir, the incident had the characteristics of a dream. He subsequently resigned from his office and converted to Isma'ilism.

In December 1045, Nasir decided to embark on a prolonged journey with the ultimate goal of performing a pilgrimage to Mecca. In March 1046, along with his brother Abu Sa'id and an Indian attendant, he started his journey, which would first end after nearly seven years. From Khurasan, he travelled west, passing through northern and western Iran, Armenia, and Asia Minor. He then descended to Syria, Palestine, and then Arabia, where he performed his pilgrimage. On August 1047, he went to Cairo in Egypt, which served as the capital of the Isma'ili Fatimid Caliphate. In Cairo, Nasir was taught Isma'ili teachings, law, and administration by prominent scholars. He met al-Mu'ayyad fi'l-Din al-Shirazi (died 1087), who was by then the chief Fatimid Da'i. He became Nasir's teacher, instructing him in enigmatic Isma'ili concepts and philosophy.

Nasir was raised to the position of dā‘ī "missionary", and appointed as Hujjat Khorasan, though the hostility he encountered in the propagation of these new religious ideas after his return to Greater Khorasan in 1052 A.D. and Sunnite fanaticism compelled him at last to flee. After wandering from place to place, he found refuge in Yamgan (about 1060 A.D.) in the mountains of Badakhshan, where he spent the last decades of his life, gathering a considerable number of devoted adherents, who have handed down his doctrines to succeeding generations.

Nasir-i Khusraw explained that through revelation (tanzil), intellectual matters were transformed into a state that could be understood by humankind. Esoteric interpretation (ta’wil) is necessary to revert them to their original intellectual state. He also said that one must not be satisfied with the exoteric form but look for the person who can explain the original esoteric meaning to them. In saying this he alluded to the Imam of the Time.

He died in Yamagan in present-day northern Afghanistan. He was buried in a small mausoleum on a small hill in the present-day village of Hadrat-i Sayyid (also called Hadrat-i Sa'id), on the eastern side of the Koksha Valley in present-day Afghanistan. According to an engraved inscription on the structure, it was renovated in 1697.

== Works ==
- Safarnama (Persian: سفرنامه)

Safarnama (The Book of Travels) is his most famous work. He visited dozens of cities in about seven years (March 6, 1046 – October 23, 1052) and wrote comprehensively about them, including details about colleges, caravanserais, mosques, scientists, kings, the public, the population, the area of the cities, and, of course, his interesting memories. After 1000 years, his Safarnama is still readable for Persian-speaking people.

- Diwan (Persian: دیوان)

Among his other works, most of the lyrical poems in his Diwan were composed in his retirement. Their chief topics are a positive praise of Ali, his descendants, and al-Mustansir in particular, along with outcries against Khorasan and its rulers, who had driven him from his home. It also explores his immense satisfaction with the quiet solitude of Yumgan, and his despondency again in seeing himself despised by his former associates and excluded from participation in the glorious contest of life. He writes that scattered through all these alternating outbursts of hope and despair, there are lessons of morality, and solemn warnings against the tricks and perfidy of the world, the vanity of all earthly splendour and greatness, the folly and injustice of men, and the hypocrisy, frivolity, and viciousness of fashionable society and princely courts in particular.

- Gushayish va Rahayish (Persian: گشایش و رهایش)

Another work of Nasir Khusraw is the Persian philosophical work "Gushayish va Rahayish" which has been translated into English by F.M. Hunzai under the title: "Knowledge and Liberation". The work discusses creation, questions about the soul, epistemology, and Ismaili Islamic doctrines. From a linguistic point of view, the work is an example of early philosophical writing in New Persian.

It is the same strain which runs, although in a somewhat lower key, through his two larger masnavis, the Rawshana-i-nama (Persian: روشنایی‌نامه) (or Book of Enlightenment, also known as Shish Fasl), and the Sa'datnama (Book of Felicity). The former is divided into two sections: the first, of a metaphysical character, contains a sort of practical cosmography, chiefly based on Avicenna's theories, but frequently intermixed both with the freer speculations of the well-known philosophical brotherhood of Basra, the Ikhwan al-Safa, and purely Shi'ite or Isma'ili ideas; the second, or ethical section of the poem, abounds in moral maxims and ingenious thoughts on man's good and bad qualities, on the necessity of shunning the company of fools and double-faced friends, on the deceptive allurements of the world and the secret snares of ambitious men craving for rank and wealth. It concludes with an imaginary vision of a beautiful work of spirits who have stripped off the fetters of earthly cares and sorrows and revel in the pure light of divine wisdom and love.

If we compare this with a similar allegory in Nasir's Diwan, which culminates in the praise of Mustansir, we are fairly entitled to look upon it as a covert allusion to the eminent men who revealed to the poet in Cairo the secrets of the Isma'ili faith, and showed him what he considered the heavenly ladder to superior knowledge and spiritual bliss.

A similar series of excellent teachings on practical wisdom and the blessings of a virtuous life, only of a more severe and uncompromising character, is contained in the Sa'datnama; and, judging from the extreme bitterness of tone manifested in the reproaches of kings and emirs, we should be inclined to consider it a protest against the vile aspersions poured out upon Nasir's moral and religious attitude during those persecutions which drove him at last to Yumgan.

Of all other works of the author, the Zaad-al-Musafirin (or Travelling Provisions of Pilgrims) and the Wajh-i Din (or The Face of Religion) are theoretical descriptions of his religious and philosophical principles; the rest of them can be dismissed as being probably just as apocryphal as Nasir's famous autobiography (found in several Persian tadhkiras or biographies of poets), a mere forgery of the most extravagant description, which is mainly responsible for the confusion in names and dates in older accounts of our author.

- Wajh-i din (Persian: وجه دین)

Nasir Khusraw explains the spiritual interpretation of the tradition of a six-day creation of the physical universe. He writes about how the story of creation is a symbolic explanation of what happened when God created the universe. Interpreting it literally is something human beings do based on the limits of their intellects. In the scriptures, when it says that God began the work of creating the world on Sunday, completed it on Friday, and then rested on Saturday, it is not a literal account, but rather a symbolic one.

When the Prophets shared the story of a six-day creation of the physical universe, it was meant for the people to understand that God was saying that six prophets would come into this world and command people to work. When the seventh day came, God would not command in this manner, but would rather reward them for their hard work.

- Book on Mathematics (Persian: غرایب الحساب و عجایب الحساب)

Nasir Khusraw wrote a mathematics book, which has now been lost. He states in his other work that he could: not find one single scholar throughout all of Khorasan and eastern lands like myself [who] could grapple with the solutions to these problems. But he felt it his responsibility to take the task for readers he would never see, 'those yet to come, in a time yet to come'

- Jamiʿ al hikmatayn (Persian: جامع الحکمتین)

== Legacy and assessment ==
Despite being one of the most prominent Isma'ili philosophers and theologians of the Fatimid era and the writer of many philosophical works intended for only the inner circle of the Isma'ili community, Nasir is best known to the general public as a poet and writer who ardently supported Persian as an artistic and scientific language. All of Nasir's philosophical Isma'ili works are in Persian, a rarity in the Isma'ili literature of the Fatimids, which primarily used Arabic.

Nasir was a key figure in the spread of Isma'ilism in Central Asia. He is with great reverence called "Pir" or "Shah Sayyid Nasir" by the Isma'ili community of Badakhshan (split between Afghanistan and Tajikistan) and their branches in northern Pakistan, who all consider him to be their founder. Devotees that visit Nasir Khusraw's mausoleum also refer to him by other names than "Nasir Khusraw", such as shāh (king), shāh-i buzurgvār (great king), mawlā (guardian), shīd-i Yumgān (sun of Yumgan), and uqāb-i Yumgān (eagle of Yumgan). The latter refers to one of Nasir Khusraw's poems, written to offer moral advice; The narrative, which is based on an ancient fable, describes an eagle circling in the sky "full of selfish pride" before being brought to the ground by an arrow with eagle feathers sewn into its fletch. The final lines of the poem convey a lesson, which has become a well-known saying amongst speakers of the Persian language; az māst ki bar māst ("what comes from us returns to us"), meaning that people possess the very characteristic that will determine both their success and failure.

== Sources ==
- Bosworth, C. E. (1988). "Balḵ ii. From the Arab conquest to the Mongols.". In Yarshater, Ehsan (ed.). Encyclopædia Iranica. Vol. III/6: Baḵtīārī tribe II–Banān. London and New York: Routledge & Kegan Paul. pp. 587–596. ISBN 978-0-71009-118-5.
- Bosworth, C. E. (1990). "Čaḡrī Beg Dāwūd". In Yarshater, Ehsan (ed.). Encyclopædia Iranica. Vol. IV/6: Burial II–Calendars II. London and New York: Routledge & Kegan Paul. pp. 617–618. ISBN 978-0-71009-129-1.
- Bosworth, C. E. (2001). "Ghaznavids". In Yarshater, Ehsan (ed.). Encyclopædia Iranica. Vol. X/6: Germany VI–Gindaros. London and New York: Routledge & Kegan Paul. pp. 578–583. ISBN 978-0-933273-55-9.
- Dabashi, Hamid (2012). Shi'ism: A Religion of Protest. Harvard University Press. ISBN 978-0674049451.
- Daftary, Farhad (2004). Ismaili Literature: A Bibliography of Sources and Studies. London and New York: I.B. Tauris. ISBN 978-0-8577-1386-5.
- Daftary, Farhad (2007). The Ismāʿı̄lı̄s: Their History and Doctrines (Second ed.). Cambridge: Cambridge University Press. ISBN 978-0-521-61636-2.
- Daftary, Farhad (2017). Ismaili History and Intellectual Traditions. Routledge. ISBN 978-1-138-28810-2.
- Gould, Rebecca Ruth (2022). The Persian Prison Poem. Edinburgh University Press. ISBN 978-1474484015.
- Hunsberger, Dr C. Alice (2003). "Nasir Khusraw: A Portrait of The Persian Poet, Traveller and Philosopher" (PDF). The Institute of Ismaili Studies: 1–14.
- Mahamid, H. (2017). "Persecutions against Ismaʿili Missionaries in Central Asia: The Case of Nāser Khosrow". Journal of Persianate Studies. 10 (1). Brill: 57–72. doi:10.1163/18747167-12341307.
- Qutbuddin, Tahera (2020). "al-Muʾayyad al-Shīrāzī". In Fleet, Kate; Krämer, Gudrun; Matringe, Denis; Nawas, John; Rowson, Everett (eds.). Encyclopaedia of Islam (3rd ed.). Brill Online. ISSN 1873-9830.
- Schadl, Marcus (2009). "The Shrine of Nasir Khusraw: Imprisoned Deep in the Valley of Yumgan". Muqarnas Online. 26 (1). Brill: 63–93. doi:10.1163/22118993_02601004.
- de Smet, Daniel (2021). "Nāṣir-i Khusraw". In Fleet, Kate; Krämer, Gudrun; Matringe, Denis; Nawas, John; Rowson, Everett (eds.). Encyclopaedia of Islam (3rd ed.). Brill Online. ISSN 1873-9830.
- Utas, Bo (2021). Persian Prose: A History of Persian Literature, Vol V. I.B. Tauris. ISBN 978-1845119065.
