= Mohammad Ayub Khalid =

Governor of Badakhshan, Afghanistan

Qāriʾ Mohammad Ayub Khalid

Governor of Badakhshan
- In office 25 June 2023 – 25 October 2025
- Supreme Leader: Hibatullah Akhundzada
- Preceded by: Abdul Ghani Faiq
- Succeeded by: Ismail Ghaznawi

Governor of Kunar
- In office 4 May 2023 – 26 June 2023
- Supreme Leader: Hibatullah Akhundzada
- Preceded by: Mawlawi Ahmad Taha
- Succeeded by: Qudratullah Abu Hamza

Personal details
- Born: Kandahar Province, Afghanistan

Qari Mohammad Ayub Khalid (Pashto: قاری محمد ایوب خالد) is an Afghan Taliban leader who served as the provincial governor of Afghanistan's northeastern Badakhshan Province (2023-2025).

== Career ==
Prior to Ayub Khalid's provincial governor postings, he reportedly served as the commander of Taliban's eastern forces.

=== Governor of Kunar ===
Ayub Khalid began as governor of Kunar Province on 4 May 2023, nearly two years into the declared Taliban Islamic Emirate of Afghanistan (IEA). His tenure in Kunar was short-lived, lasting only two months, before he'd be reassigned to Badakhshan following the assassination of acting governor Nisar Ahmad Ahmadi.

=== Governor of Badakhshan ===
Badakhshan Province

On 26 June 2023, Taliban Supreme Leader Mullah Hibatullah Akhundzada appointed Ayub Khalid to serve as the governor of Badakhshan Province, departing his former position as governor of Kunar Province with Mawlawi Qudratullah Abu Hamza replacing him (Abu Hamza transferred from governorship in Zabul). Taliban spokesman Zabihullah Mujahid announced the inter-province transfer via Twitter alongside appointments to governorate posts in Kunar and Zabul. Ayub Khalid's appointment as governor of Badakhshan shortly followed the assassination of the province's former acting governor, Nisar Ahmad Ahmadi, by the Islamic State's Khorasan Province (ISIS–K). On 6 June 2023, an explosive-laden vehicle was driven into Ahmadi's vehicle while driving in the provincial capital of Faizabad killing Ahmadi, his driver, and injuring six nearby civilians.

Ayub Khalid was replaced by Ismail Ghaznawi on 25 October 2025.

==== Projects ====
In mid-January 2024, Ayub Khalid announced in an interview with the state-controlled Bakhtar News Agency both the completion of the Little Pamir Road connecting Afghanistan and the People's Republic of China and upcoming plans to pave the road with asphalt. The road project was initiated by the former Islamic Republic of Afghanistan in order to open investment opportunities (primarily resource mining) in Afghanistan to the Chinese market. While praising the improved opportunities for trade with China, Ayub Khalid made no comments regarding Chinese funding of the project. Chinese critics, including Zhu Yongbiao, an international relations scholar from Lanzhou University, have expressed wariness towards the actual economic value of the road and the risks of Uyghur militants traveling between Afghanistan and Xinjiang Province, viewing the project's primary value as symbolic. In an interview with the Hong Kong-based South China Morning Post, Zhu described the road as "largely devoid of practical access and economic value... It is not only too costly, it will not bring any economic value in the short term" adding "China must have its security considerations. The road is not economically worthwhile, but it must have security risks."

==== Incidents ====
At 7:00 PM AFT on 21 January 2024, a Dassault Falcon 10 business jet medically evacuating a woman from Rayong, Thailand to Moscow along with her husband and a flight crew (all Russian nationals) crashed in the mountains of Badakhshan Province after attempting a emergency low-fuel landing in Tajikistan. Afghan search teams, including the Afghan Air Force, located the downed aircraft and later a surviving nurse with minor injuries. After reports surfaced of a supposed $1.2 million sum missing from the crashed plane, Ayub Khalid created an investigative commission to look into the reported theft. The validity of the reports as well as the results of that investigation remain unclear.

From 3 to 13 May 2024, nearly a year into Ayub Khalid's tenure as provincial governor, a series of rare protests and demonstrations against Taliban public administration broke out in the Darayim and Argo districts of Badakhshan. Complaints presented by protestors included the Taliban's unpopular hardline policies and the Taliban's installation of provincial leaders from other provinces including a governor (Ayub Khalid) from Kandahar, a deputy governor from Takhar, a police commander from Parwan, and a security chief from Laghman. Protests began on 3 May in response to strong Taliban enforcement of bans on illicit drugs where many impoverished Badakhshani farmers draw sole income on opium-producing poppy crops. Opposing the burning of poppy fields, protestors shuttered shops and chanted against Supreme Leader Akhundzada who had issued the ruling against poppy cultivation. The Taliban dispatched a team of negotiators to meet with protesting farmers and eventually announced a peaceful end to the demonstrations. When protests returned on 13 May, the Taliban brutally cracked down and opened fire on protestors, killing two, wounding more than twelve others.

== Personal life ==
Mohammad Ayub Khalid was born in the Pashtun-dominant southern province of Kandahar. Ayub Khalid was reportedly once close to Mullah Dadullah, a former top Taliban military commander until his death in 2007, known as "The Butcher" for his extreme brutality and regionally-novel employment of beheadings.
