= Ashnam =

Ashnam Āshnām
- Location in Afghanistan
- Coordinates: 36°36′28″N 70°46′51″E
- Country: Afghanistan
- Province: Badakhshan Province
- District: Yamgan
- Time zone: + 4.30

Ashnam is a village in Badakhshan Province in north-eastern Afghanistan.

== Geography ==
The village lies towards the northern edge of the Hindu Kush mountain range which crosses over into Pakistan.

It is on Jurm River, about five miles from the Kokcha River. the Ashnam is situated 5.8 miles (9.3 km) away from Khaneqa, 6.6 miles (10.6 km) away from Safcan, 3.3 miles (5.3 km) away from Dasht Asnam and 4.5 miles (7.2 km) away from Kheasp.

== History ==
On 6 April 2004 the village was affected by the earthquake that affected parts of Badakhshan. Ashnam was only 25 kilometres (16 mi) from the earthquake epicentre and was listed by the European Union as an area of assistance following the quake.

== Transport ==
The nearest airport is 64 kilometres (40 mi) to the north, at Khorog.
