= Farghamu =

Farghamu Farghāmū Firgāmū, Farghamunj
- Location in Afghanistan
- Coordinates: 36°23′9″N 70°44′44″E
- Country: Afghanistan
- Province: Badakhshan Province
- District: Yamgan
- Time zone: + 4.30

Farghamu (Firgāmū, Farghamunj, Fargha Mikh, Farghā Mīkh, Farghāmū, frghamw, فرغامو) is a village in Badakhshan Province in north-eastern Afghanistan. It lies on the left bank of a stream in a valley of the Upper Kokcha River. The ground is generally laid out in fields. It is on the frontier of the Shia-Posh Kafirs. Around the turn of the 20th century roughly 30 families lived here. At that time, there was no bridge or ford of the river there.
