= Artin Jelow =

Artin Jelow Ārtīn Jelow
- Location in Afghanistan
- Coordinates: 37°4′40″N 70°10′1″E
- Country: Afghanistan
- Province: Badakhshan Province
- District: Argo
- Time zone: UTC+4:30 (Afghanistan Time)

Artin Jelow (also Atin Jilao) is a village in Badakhshan Province's Argo District in northeastern Afghanistan. It is roughly 16 miles (26 km) southeast of the village of Rostaq. There is a bridge over the Kokcha River there. In the 1970s, the village population was primarily Tajik.
