= Baharak, Afghanistan =

Baharak بهارک (Dari)
- Town
- Location in Afghanistan
- Coordinates: 37°0′10″N 70°54′27″E
- Country: Afghanistan
- Province: Badakhshan
- District: Baharak
- Elevation: 4,797 ft (1,462 m)
- Time zone: + 4.30

Baharak (Dari: شهر بهارک, romanized: Šahre Bahārak) is a small town and the seat of Baharak district, Badakhshan province, in northeastern Afghanistan. It is roughly 15 kilometers from Jorm, on the Kokcha River. Baharak Girls' School was opened on December 17, 2006, by Munshi Abdul Majid the Governor of Badakhshan Province, it serves about 3,000 girls who attend in three separate shifts during the day.

== Climate ==
Baharak has a humid continental climate (Köppen: Dsb) with warm, dry summers and cold, snowy winters.

Climate data for Baharak
Month	Jan	Feb	Mar	Apr	May	Jun	Jul	Aug	Sep	Oct	Nov	Dec	Year
Daily mean °C (°F)	−6.1 (21.0)	−4.3 (24.3)	1.5 (34.7)	7.8 (46.0)	12.1 (53.8)	16.9 (62.4)	20.1 (68.2)	20.0 (68.0)	15.8 (60.4)	9.6 (49.3)	2.7 (36.9)	−3.0 (26.6)	7.8 (46.0)
Average precipitation mm (inches)	69.7 (2.74)	106.4 (4.19)	114.2 (4.50)	144.3 (5.68)	150.1 (5.91)	45.1 (1.78)	4.6 (0.18)	1.9 (0.07)	2.9 (0.11)	28.1 (1.11)	65.0 (2.56)	49.1 (1.93)	559 (22.0)
Source 1: ClimateCharts(1989-2019)
Source 2: World Weather Online (precipitation)
