= Ao Barik =

Ao Barik Aō Bārīk
- Country: Afghanistan
- Province: Badakhshan Province
- District: Argo

Ao Barik is a village in Afghanistan. It lies roughly 15 miles southwest of Faizabad in Badakhshan Province. There is also a valley of that name in Afghanistan, descending north from the Kaoshan pass.
