= Abdul Ghani Faiq =

Governor of Badakhshan Province

Maulvi Abdul Ghani Faiq
- مولوي عبدالغني فايق
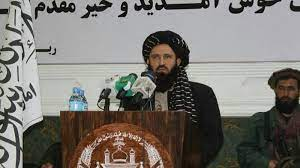

Governor of Badakhshan
- In office 7 November 2021 – September 2023
- Prime Minister: Hasan Akhund
- Emir: Hibatullah Akhundzada
- Preceded by: Amanuddin Mansoor
- Succeeded by: Mohammad Ayub Khalid

Maulvi Abdul Ghani Faiq (Pashto: مولوي عبدالغني فايق) is an Afghan Taliban politician who served as governor of Badakhshan province from 7 November 2021 to September 2023. He is a resident of Badakhshan and also served as a member of the negotiation team in Qatar office.
