= Mohammad Akbar Barakzai =

Governor of Baghlan, Afghanistan

Mohammad Akbar Barakzai محمد اکبر بارکزی
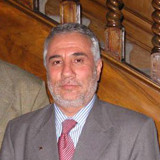

Governor of Baghlan
- In office 12 January 2009 – May 2010
- Preceded by: Abdul Jabar Haqbeen
- Succeeded by: Munshi Abdul Majeed

Personal details
- Born: Baghlan Province, Afghanistan

Mohammad Akbar Barakzai (Pashto: محمد اکبر بارکزی) is a politician in Afghanistan, serving as the Governor of Baghlan from 2009 to 2010.

== Biography ==
Mohammad Akbar was born in Baghlan Province of Afghanistan. He graduated from Baghlan's Agriculture school in 1989. Akbar has served as the deputy administrator in the Ministry of Water and Power and also worked at the Ministry of Mines for a year.

Preceded by Abdul Jabar Haqbeen	Governor of Baghlan, Afghanistan; 2009–2010	Succeeded by
