= Nisar Ahmad Ahmadi =

Afghan politician (died 2023)

Acting Governor of Badakhshan
- In office 15 August 2021 – 6 June 2023

Personal details
- Died: 6 June 2023 Faizabad, Badakhshan, Afghanistan

Nisar Ahmad Ahmadi (died 6 June 2023) was a member of the Afghan Taliban militant group who was made the Taliban's acting governor of Badakhshan province in northeastern Afghanistan. He was assassinated in a car bombing in the provincial capital, Faizabad. The attack was claimed by the Islamic State – Khorasan Province (ISIS–K).

== Assassination ==
Ahmadi was the target of a car bombing in June 2023 in Faizabad, the provincial capital of Badakhshan. A suicide bomber rammed his explosives-laden vehicle into the automobile carrying Ahmadi, setting up a huge explosion. Along with the driver of his vehicle, the acting governor died instantly. Additionally, six nearby citizens were hurt in the attack.
