= Teshkan Bridge =

Bridge in Afghanistan

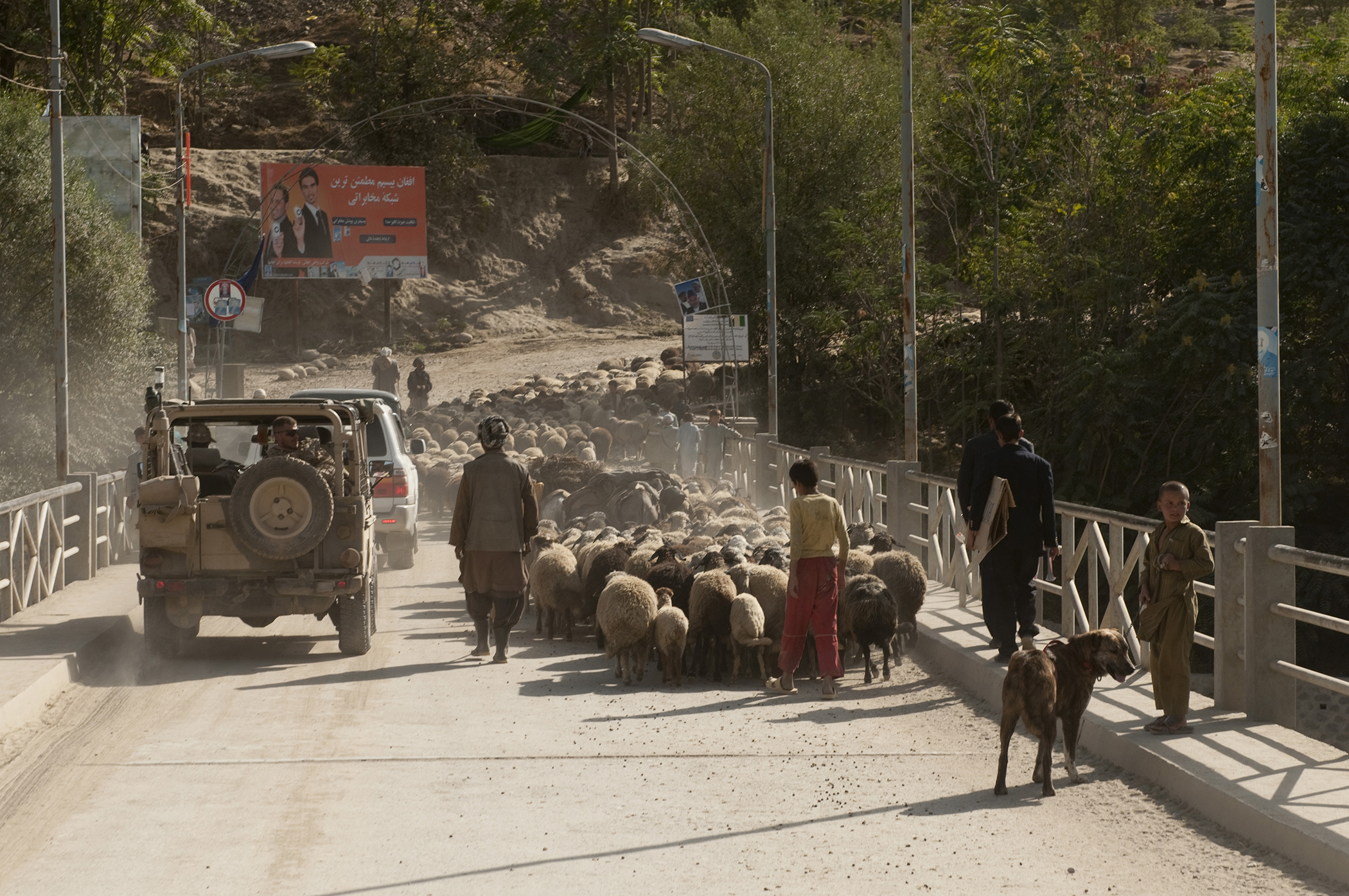
Sheep share the Teshkan bridge with vehicular traffic in Badakhshan.

The Teshkan Bridge in Badakhshan is a bridge across the Kokcha River. Highway 302, which crosses the bridge, is the only road connection between Badakhshan and the rest of Afghanistan.

In 1999 the bridge was a strategic resource fought over by two competing militia leaders.

In 2007 ISAF forces and Provincial Reconstruction Team Feyzabad reconstructed a bridge built by the Soviet Union. The new bridge took two months to build. A steel frame and a new surface were built on top of the existing bridge, using the existing bridge pier. The Governor of Badakhshan presided over the ribbon-cutting on October 16, 2007, when the bridge was recommissioned.
