= Safarnama =

Account of 11th-century Persian poet Nasir Khusraw's travels through the Islamic world

Safarnāma (Persian: سفرنامه) is a book of travel literature written during the 11th century by Nasir Khusraw (1003–1077). It is also known as the Book of Travels. It is an account of Khusraw's seven-year journey through the Islamic world. He initially set out on a Hajj, the obligatory Pilgrimage to Mecca. Departing on 5 March 1046, Khusraw took a less than direct route, heading north toward the Caspian Sea. Throughout his travels he kept a minutely detailed journal which clearly describes many facets of life in the Islamic world of the 11th Century.

Nasir Khusraw compiled the Safarnama in a later period of his life, using notes that he had taken along his seven-year journey. His prose is straightforward, resembling a travelogue as opposed to his more poetic and philosophical Diwan. Khusraw begins his Safarnama with a description of himself, his life, and his monumental decision to travel to Mecca. He recounts an extraordinary dream in which he converses with a man who encourages him to seek out that which is beneficial to the intellect. Before the dream ends, the man allegedly points towards the qibla and says nothing more.

In the remaining sections of the Safarnama, Khusraw describes cities and towns along the path of his journey, with particular focus on Mecca, Jerusalem, and Cairo (the capital of the Fatimid Caliphate at the time). Khusraw's work is appreciated for its detailed descriptions of these cities, with precise accounts of civic buildings and markets.
