= Amanuddin Mansur =

Governor of Helmand since 2025

Mullah Amanuddin Mansur
- امان الدین منصور

Governor of Helmand
- Incumbent
- Assumed office October 2025
- Supreme Leader: Hibatullah Akhundzada
- Prime Minister: Hasan Akhund (acting)

Commander-in-Chief of the Afghan Air Force
- In office December 2021 – 2022

Governor of Badakhshan
- In office September 2021 – 6 November 2021
- Preceded by: Muhammad Zakariya Sawda
- Succeeded by: Abdul Ghani Faiq

Military service
- Allegiance: Islamic Emirate of Afghanistan
- Branch/service: Islamic Emirate Air Force
- Rank: Commander-in-Chief
- Commands: Commander-in-Chief of the Afghan Air Force

Amanuddin Mansur (Dari: امان الدین منصور, romanized: Amānuddīn Manṣūr) is an Afghan politician who is serving as the governor of Helmand province since 2025. He previously served as commander-in-chief of Afghan Air Force from 2021 to 2022. He also served as governor of Badakhshan from August 2021 to November 2021.

An ethnic Tajik, Mansoor is considered part of the "Badakhshan faction" of the Taliban, led by Fasihuddin Fitrat. It is regarded as one of the three main factions within the Taliban, the other two being the "Kandahar faction" led by Hibatullah Akhundzada and the "Kabul faction" led by Sirajuddin Haqqani.

== Biography ==
Amanuddin Mansur was born in the Badakhshan province, northern Afghanistan, to an ethnic Tajik family.

Mansoor served as deputy commander of the 209 Al-Fatah Military Corps in Mazar-e-Sharif in the months following the Taliban's takeover in 2021.

In March 2023, an old video of Mansur circulated on the internet, in which he made Tajik irredentist claims to seize parts of Tajikistan into Afghanistan. However, he later issued an apology for the statements.

In October 2025, Mansur was appointed the governor of Helmand province.
