= Diwan (Nasir Khusraw) =

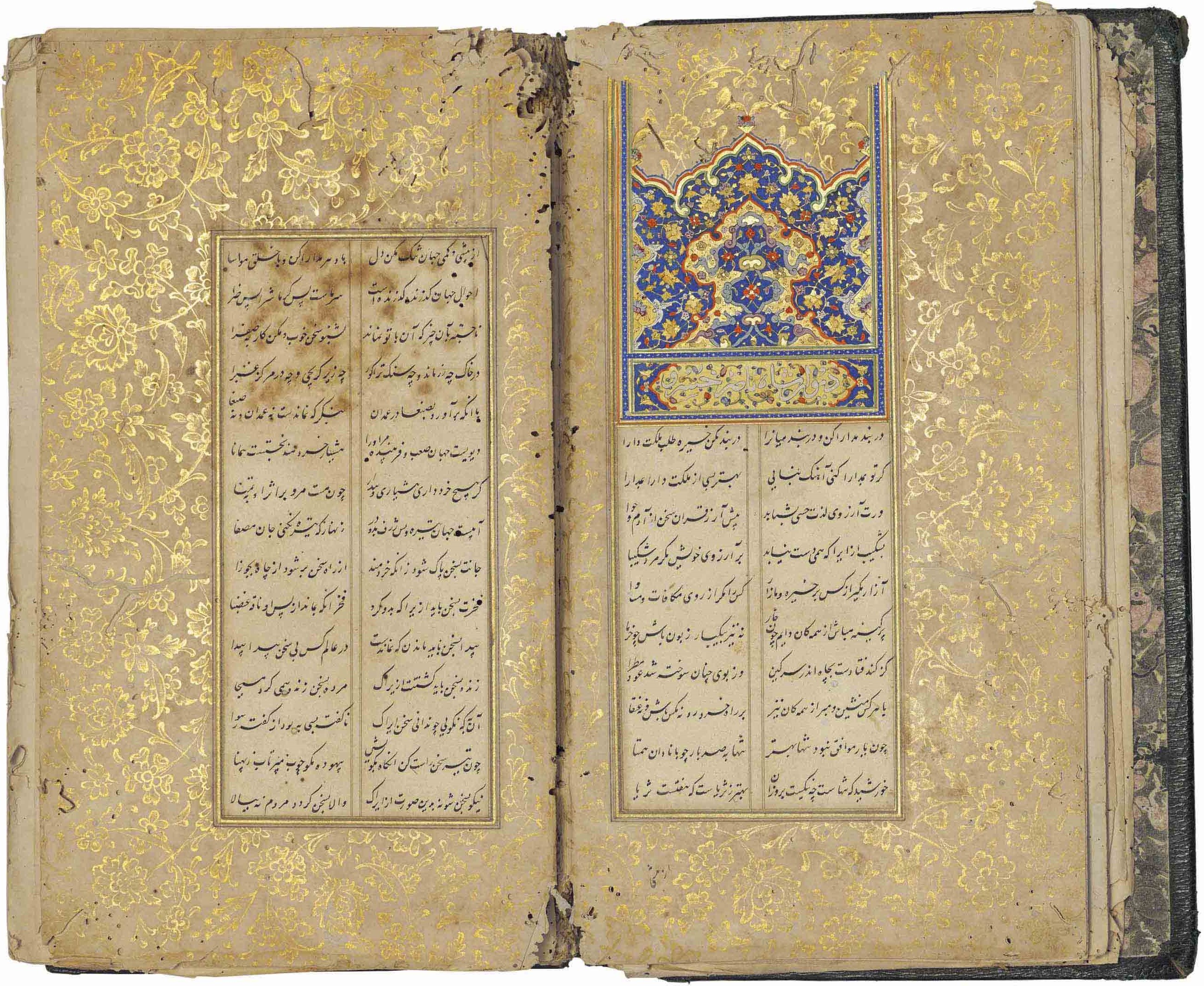
Copy of the diwan of Nasir Khusraw, created in 1621 at Hyderabad

The Diwan, or Divan (Persian: دیوان), is a collection of poems written and compiled by Nasir Khusraw (1004–1088 AD). Khusraw composed most of his poems in the Valley of Yumgan, a remote mountainous region in Badakhshan (in present-day Afghanistan). The Divan contains around 11,000 verses of Khusraw's own poetry, reflecting philosophical, religious, and personal themes.

== Poetry ==
The majority of poems contained in the Diwan are odes composed in the classical qasida form (a structured poetic form with an elaborate metre). The qasida maintains a single rhyme carried throughout the entirety of the poem. In terms of rhythm, each line (bayt) of the qasida consists of two equal parts. The Divan also contains quatrains and shorter poems.

Khusraw employs sophisticated rhetorical and poetic devices in his work. Su’al u javab, or question and answer, is used frequently. Antanaclasis is also employed, often with words that denote both places and things. In her book, Make A Shield From Wisdom: Selected Verses from Nasir-i Khusraw's Divan, Annemarie Schimmel gives the example of the play on Sham meaning Syria, and sham denoting the 'evening', that occurs throughout the Divan.

== Content ==
Unlike the poetry of the traditional Persian court poets, for which Khusraw shows distaste in the Divan (refer to Divan 97 cf. 436), Khusraw's poetry explores topics encompassing (but not limited to) philosophy, particularly ethics and metaphysics, religion, the pursuit of knowledge, faith and reasoning, and the natural world. The framework and underlying theme of his Divan is religious in nature. Schimmel points out that even Khusraw's outward descriptions of nature are linked to the Creator and to the Qur'an. Throughout the poems, Khusraw exhorts that an esoteric interpretation of the Qur'an is important, as are the exoteric rituals and practices.

There are also instances of historical commentary and personal emotion, longing, and expression present in his poetry (Divan 65:18-20; Khusraw comments on the conquest of Khurasan by the Seljuqs.) In particular, Nasir Khusraw dedicates long verses to the Ismaili Caliph-Imam al-Mustansir who ruled over the Fatimid Caliphate at the time.

The Divan continues to be analyzed for its historical, philosophical, and literary merit.

== Controversy ==
There has been a long-standing debate regarding the authorship of the Sa'adat-nama (The Book of Happiness), published in the 1925-1928 edition of the Divan. Under the collaboration of scholars in the early twentieth century, it was added to the aforementioned edition. Some argue, however, that the extensive poem was in fact written by a man with the same name: Nasir Khusraw-i Isfahani. Malik al-Shu'ara Bahar states this in his Sabk Shenāsi (Methodology).

== See also ==
- Safarnama
- Persian Literature
