= Baz Mohammad Ahmadi =

Politician

Governor of Badakshan
- In office 2 May 2009 – 2010
- Preceded by: Abdul Munshi Majid
- Succeeded by: Shah Waliullah Adeeb

Governor of Ghor
- In office July 2007 – May 2009
- Preceded by: Shah Abdul Ahad Afzali
- Succeeded by: Mohammad Eqbal Munib

Personal details
- Party: Jamiat-e Islami

Baz Mohammad Ahmadi (Ahmady) is the Deputy Minister of Interior for Counter-Narcotics and the former Governor of Badakhshan, in Afghanistan. He used to be Governor of Ghor Province. Ahmadi is an ethnic Tajik and was a mid-level commander in the Jamiat Islami military alliance under Ahmed Shah Massoud that fought in the civil wars that dominated Afghanistan after the withdrawal of Soviet occupation forces in the early 1990s. After the American-led invasion of 2001, Ahmadi became a high-ranking Afghan defense department functionary, including a posting as Ismail Khan's replacement as military commander of Herat Province.

Ahmadi has been accused of human rights violations by Human Rights Watch due to his actions in the post-Soviet conflict.

Preceded by Abdul Munshi Majid	Governor of Badakhshan; 2009–2010	Succeeded by Shah Waliullah Adeeb
Preceded by Shah Abdul Ahad Afzali	Governor of Ghor; 2007–2009	Succeeded by Mohammad Eqbal Munib
