= Kuran wa Munjan District =

Coordinates: 36°01′31″N 70°46′03″E

Kuran wa Munjan کران و منجان
- District
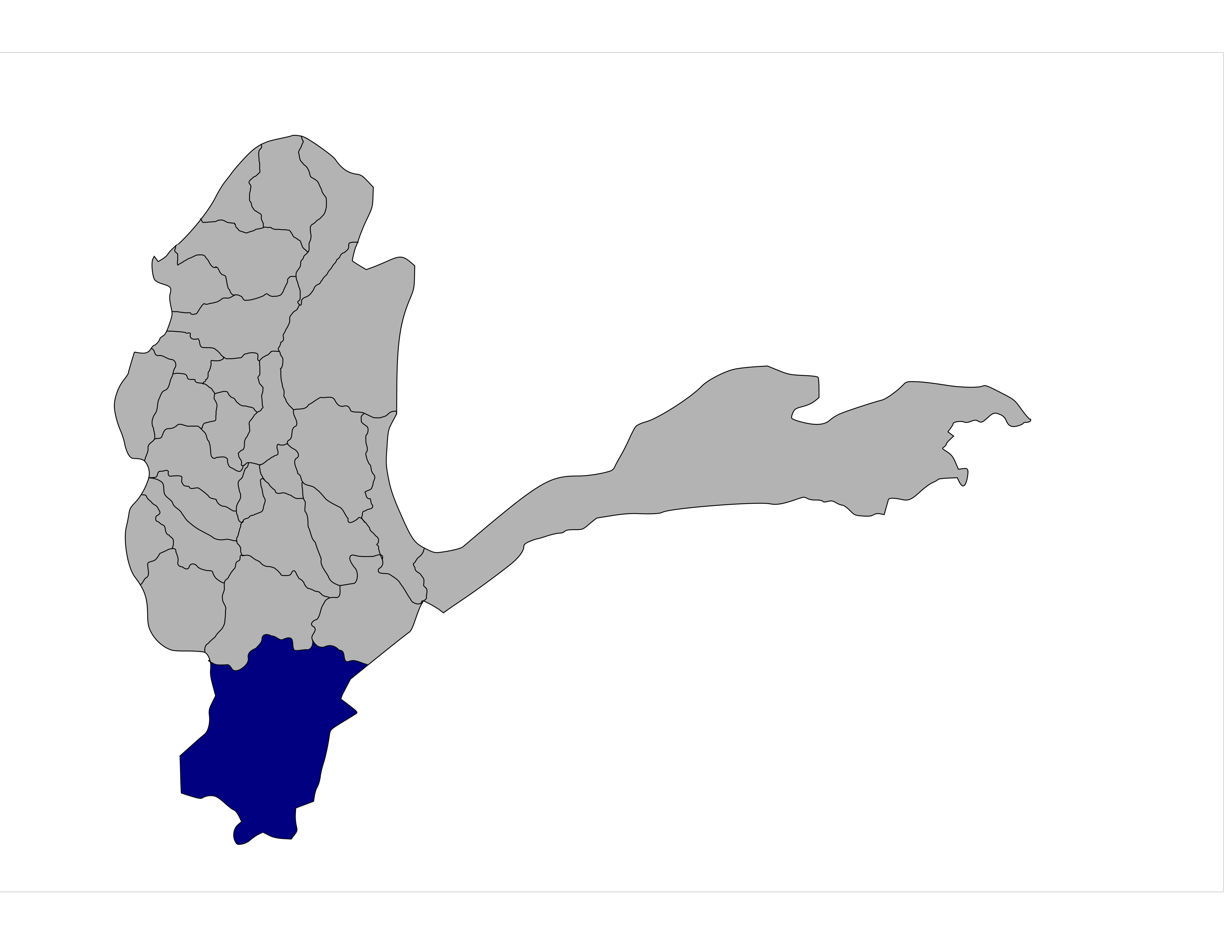
- Country: Afghanistan
- Province: Badakhshan
- Capital: Kuran wa Munjan

Government
  - Type: District administrator with advisory district council

Population
  - Estimate: 10,761

Kurān wa Munjān (Dari: کران و منجان) or Kurān aw Munjān (Pashto: کران او منجان) is one of the 28 districts of Badakhshan province in eastern Afghanistan. Located in the Hindu Kush mountains, the district is home to approximately 10,761 residents. The district administrative center is Kuran wa Munjan.

The district is in the southwest corner of the province, and is bordered on its northeast side by the Jurm and Zebak Districts. Most of the district borders other Afghan provinces, but a very small section on the eastern edge of the district lies on the international border of Afghanistan and Pakistan.

The epicenter of the October 26 2015 Hindu Kush earthquake was 45 km north of here. Famous valleys include the Koksha Valley nearby the Koksha river, which is famous for its mines.
