= Separadi, Yardymli =

Separadi
- Municipality
- Location within Azerbaijan
- Coordinates: 38°55′N 48°25′E
- Country: Azerbaijan
- Rayon: Yardymli

Population
  - Total: 750
- Time zone: UTC+4 (AZT)
  - Summer (DST): UTC+5 (AZT)

Separadi (also, Separady) is a village and municipality in the Yardymli Rayon of Azerbaijan. It has a population of 750. The municipality consists of the villages of Separadi and Teşkan.
