= Koksha Valley =

Valley located in Badakhshan Province, Afghanistan

Kokcha Valley قوقچه
- Kokcha
- Location within Afghanistan
- Coordinates: 35°N 70°E
- Country: Afghanistan
- Province: Badakhshan
- District: Kuran Wa Munjan and Jurm

Kokcha (Note: Pashto: کوکچه Dari: کوکچه) is a valley located in Badakhshan Province's Kuran Wa Munjan District in Afghanistan. Kokcha is famous for its lapis lazuli found in the mines of Sar-e-Sang since the 3rd millennium BC. Kokcha Valley includes Mount Ladjuar. The main river is the Kokcha River, the tributary in the valley. Parts of the valley are also located in Jurm District.
