= Teşkan =

- Location within Azerbaijan
- Coordinates: 38°54′N 48°27′E
- Country: Azerbaijan
- Rayon: Yardymli
- Municipality: Separadi
- Time zone: UTC+4 (AZT)
  - Summer (DST): UTC+5 (AZT)

Teşkan (also, Teshkan and Tashkyand) is a village in the Yardymli Rayon of Azerbaijan. The village forms part of the municipality of Separadi.
