= Shah Waliullah Adeeb =

Afghan politician

Governor of Badakshan
- In office 2 November 2010 – 25 October 2015
- Preceded by: Baz Mohammad Ahmadi
- Succeeded by: Ahmad Faisal Begzad

Personal details
- Born: 1969 (age 56–57) Bhangi Parha, Badakhshan, Afghanistan

Shah Waliullah Adeeb (born 1969) is an Afghan politician who served as the Governor of Badakhshan from 2010 to 2015. He is the son of Mohammad Islam, Shah Waliullah Adeeb. After the Soviet invasion of Afghanistan, Adeeb migrated to Pakistan, where he attended an institute and college in Peshawar. He then earned his degree in Arabic literature and Islamic education in Libya. He completed a master's degree at a Sudanese state university, a doctorate degree from Sudan's Khartoum State University, and a third degree in 2007 from an international vocational institute in United States. He also served in various government positions both inside and outside Afghanistan.

Before assuming the office of governor of Badakhshan, Adeeb served as head, spokesman and high council member in the higher education ministry. During his stay in Pakistan, he was member of Almujahidoon magazine. He worked as an official in Afghanistan Embassy in Libya and was additionally the leader of a youth organization for migration in Pakistan, Libya and Sudan. He worked as a lecturer at Africa University in Sudan in addition to various other capacities. Shah Waliullah Adeeb has written several books and papers and attended multiple national and international conferences and seminars. He speaks Dari, Pashto, Arabic and English, and is affiliated with the Jamiat Islami Party.

Preceded by Baz Mohammad Ahmadi	Governor of Badakhshan; 2 November 2010–25 October 2015	Succeeded by Ahmad Faisal Begzad
