= Kokcha River =

River in Afghanistan

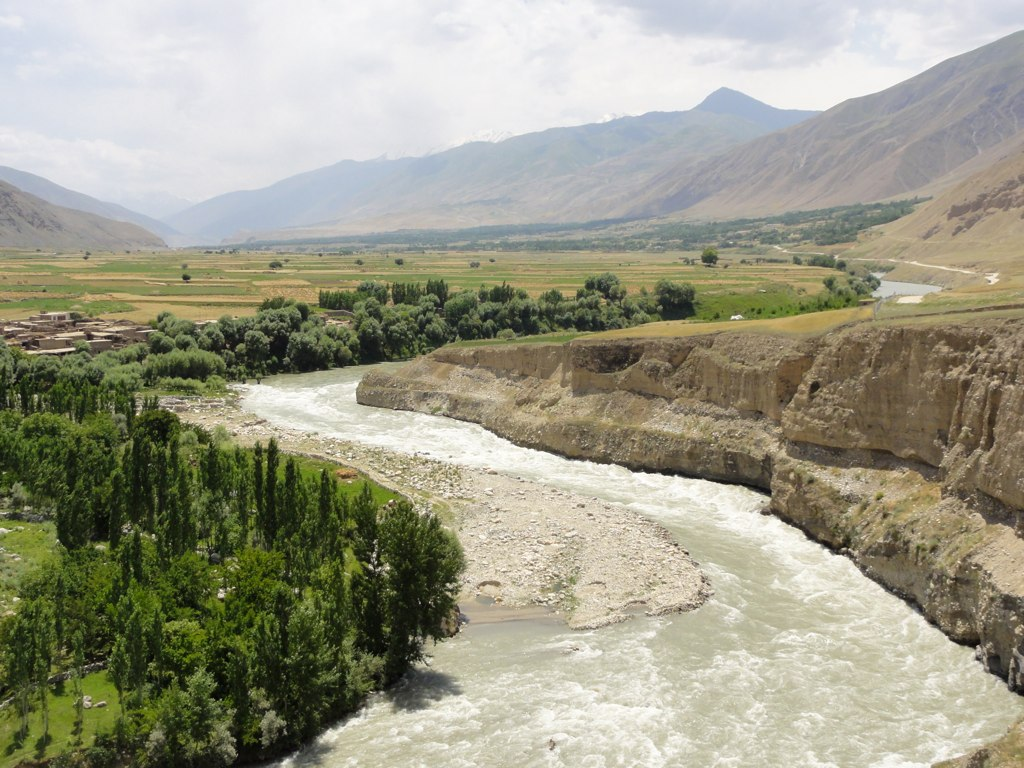
- The Kokcha River in Badakhshan Province

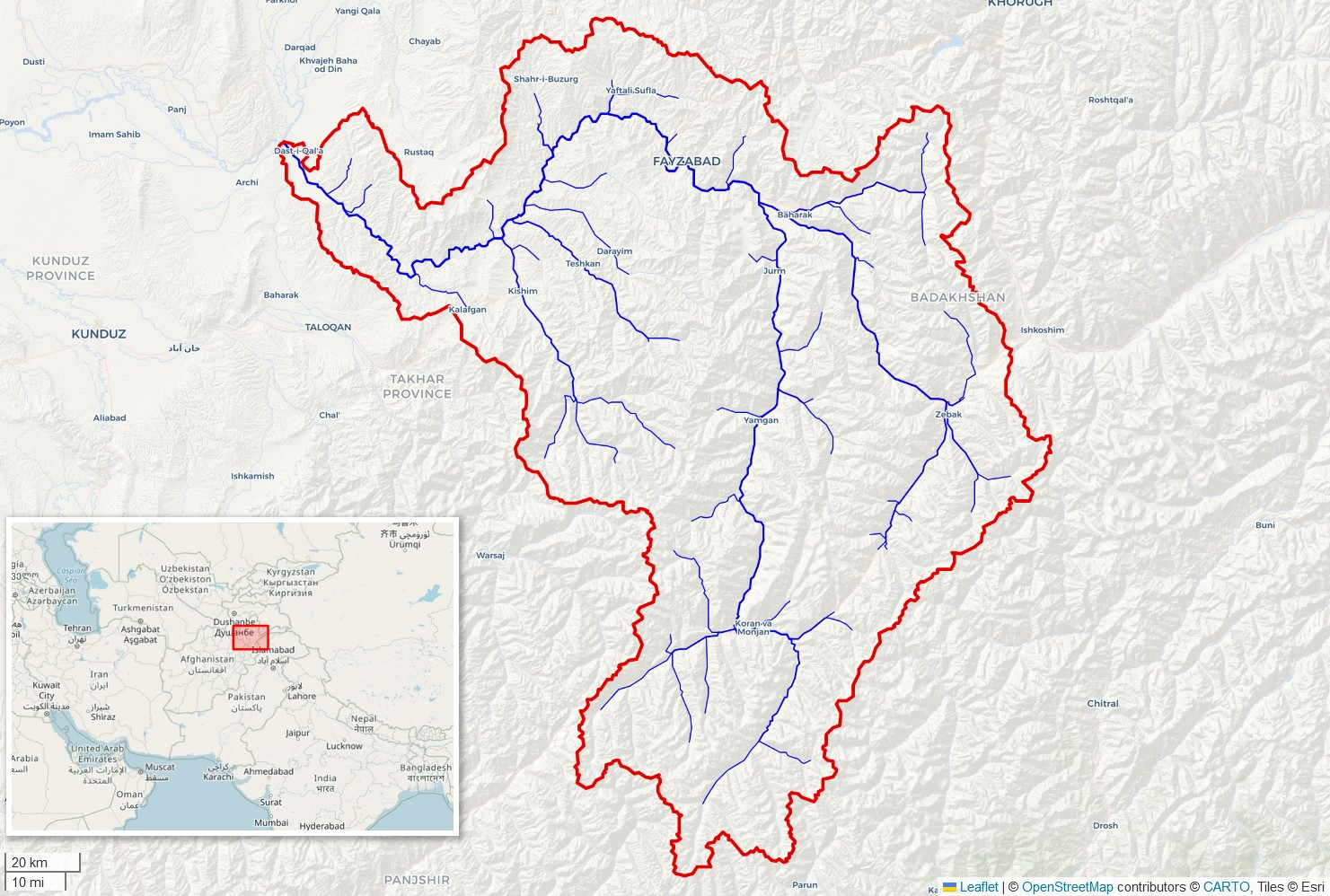
- Kokcha River watershed (Interactive map)

Location
- Country: Afghanistan
- Provinces: Badakhshan and Takhar

Physical characteristics
- Source
  - location: Confluence of mountain rivers near Koran va Manjan in the Panjshir Valley, Hindu Kush Mountains, Badakhshan Province, Afghanistan
  - coordinates: 36.026°N 70.72°E
  - elevation: 2,500 m (8,200 ft)
- Mouth: Confluence with the Panj River near Dast-i-Qal'a, Afghanistan
  - location: Dashti Qala District
  - coordinates: 37°09′48″N 69°23′48″E
  - elevation: 446 m (1,463 ft)
- Length: 320 km (200 mi)
- Basin size: 22,367.3 km^{2} (8,636.1 sq mi)
- Discharge
  - average: 101–163 m^{3}/s (3,600–5,800 cu ft/s)

Basin features
- Population: 715,236

The Kokcha River (Note: Pashto: د کوکچې سیند Dari: رودخانه کوکچه) is located in northeastern Afghanistan. A tributary of the Panj river, it flows through Badakhshan Province in the Hindu Kush. It is named after the Koksha Valley. The city of Feyzabad lies along the Kokcha. Near the village of Artin Jelow there is a bridge over the river.

== Course ==
The Kokcha begins in Kuran wa Munjan District near the district center of Kuran wa Munjan and flows north, passing through Yamgan District and Jurm District. Near the village of Baharak, the Warduj river meets the Kokcha. The river then flows east, going around the northern border of Argo District and passing Feyzabad. Finally, the 320-km long Kokcha enters Takhar Province, flows around the southern border of Rustaq District, and discharges into the Amu Darya near Ai-Khanoum.

== See also ==
- List of rivers of Afghanistan
- Teshkan Bridge
