= Munshi Abdul Majid =

Afghan politician

Munshi Abdul Majid منشي عبدالمجید
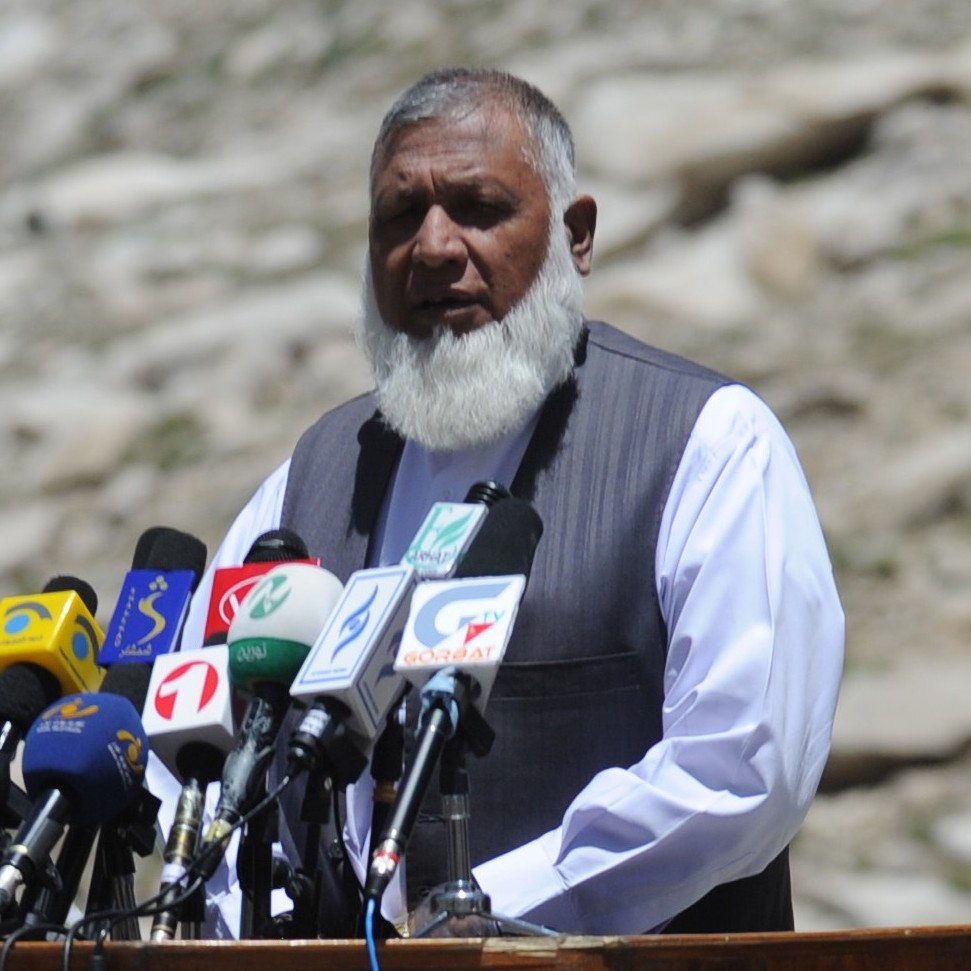
- Munshi Abdul Majid speaking in June 2011

Governor of Badakshan
- In office 2006–2009
- Preceded by: Sayed Amin Tareq
- Succeeded by: Baz Mohammad Ahmadi

Governor of Baghlan
- In office April 2010 – 19 September 2012
- Preceded by: Mohammad Akbar Barakzai
- Succeeded by: Sultan Mohammad Ebadi

Personal details
- Born: 1952 (age 73–74) Baghlan Province, Kingdom of Afghanistan
- Party: Hezb-e-Islami Gulbuddin

Munshi Abdul Majid (Pashto: منشي عبدالمجید; born 1952) is an Afghan politician. He is an ethnic Tajik from Baghlan Province. In the 1990s he served as an official in the Afghan Interior Ministry; he is also known as a writer and orator in Persian and Pashto.

In 2005 he was appointed governor of Badakhshan Province, where in 2007 he led a successful opium eradication campaign. The opium poppy cultivation zones were reduced to 200 hectares, whereas they had reached 15,607 hectares in 2004. However, the fall of opium prices might have also played an important part in this decrease. In addition, the eradication campaign caused a worsening of the security situation in Badakhshan. In April 2009, protests erupted over Governor Majid's alleged abuse of power, and he was removed from his post. In 2010, he was appointed governor of Baghlan Province.

Governor Majid is a high-ranking member of Hezb-e-Islami Gulbuddin, and he is allegedly involved in strengthening the party and rebuilding its communications network across the country. He is close to fellow Hezb-e-Islami member Juma Khan Hamdard.

== Notes ==
Preceded by Sayed Amin Tariq	Governor of Badakshan; 2006–2009	Succeeded by Baz Mohammad Ahmadi

Preceded by Mohammad Akbar Barakzai	Governor of Baghlan; 2010–present	Succeeded by Incumbent
