= Kuran wa Munjan =

Kuran wa Munjan Dari: کران و منجان
- Village
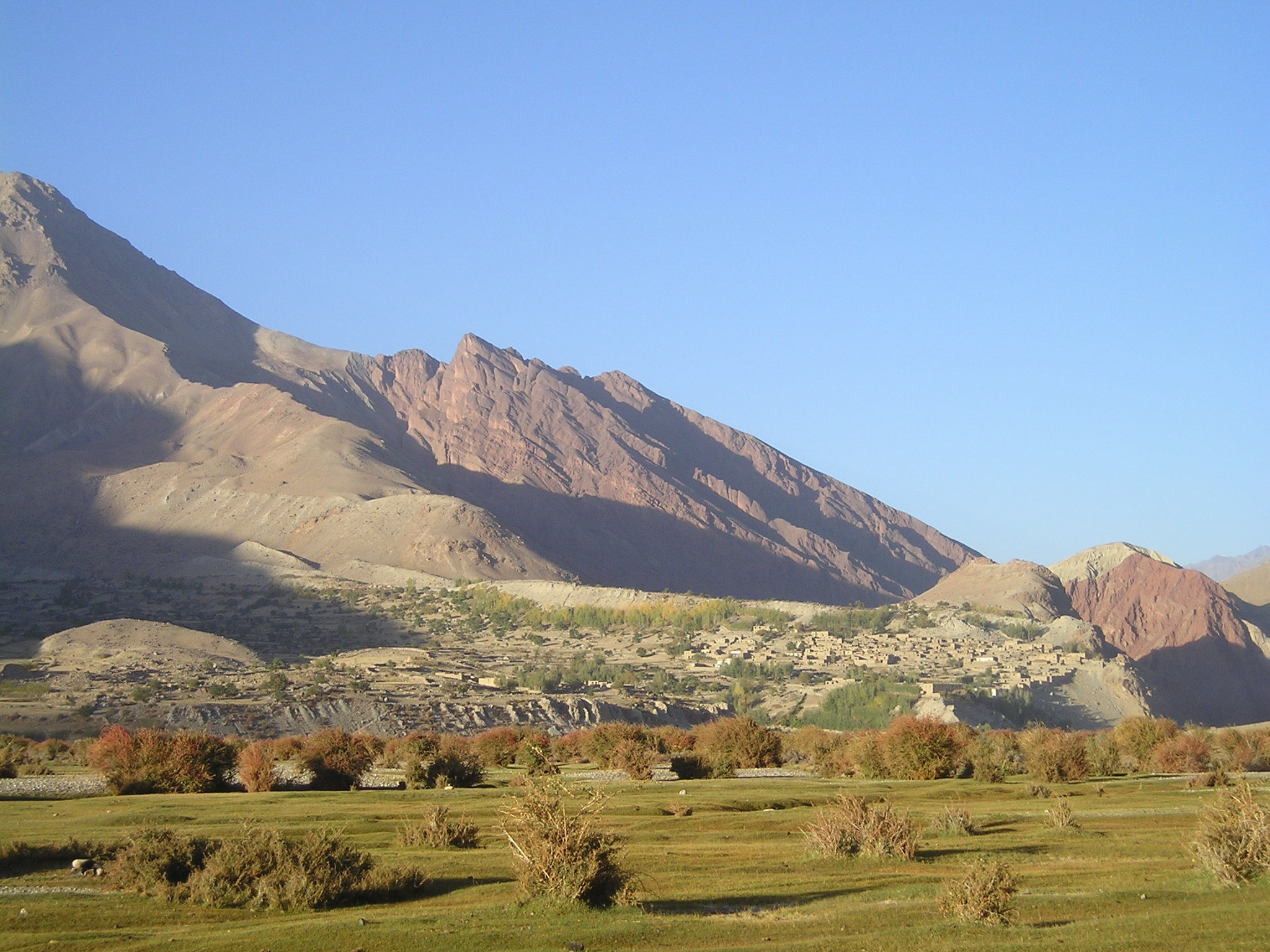
- Kuran wa Munjan valley, looking to the west.

- Location in Afghanistan
- Coordinates: 36°01′43″N 070°46′21″E
- Country: Afghanistan
- Province: Badakhshan
- District: Kuran wa Munjan
- Elevation: 8,291 ft (2,527 m)
- Time zone: UTC+04:30

Kurān wa Munjān, also spelled Kiran wa Munjan (‘Alāqahdārī Kirān wa Munjān) or Koran va Monjan, (Dari: کران و منجان) is a village in Badakhshan Province in north-eastern Afghanistan. It is the capital of Kuran wa Munjan District.

== Climate ==
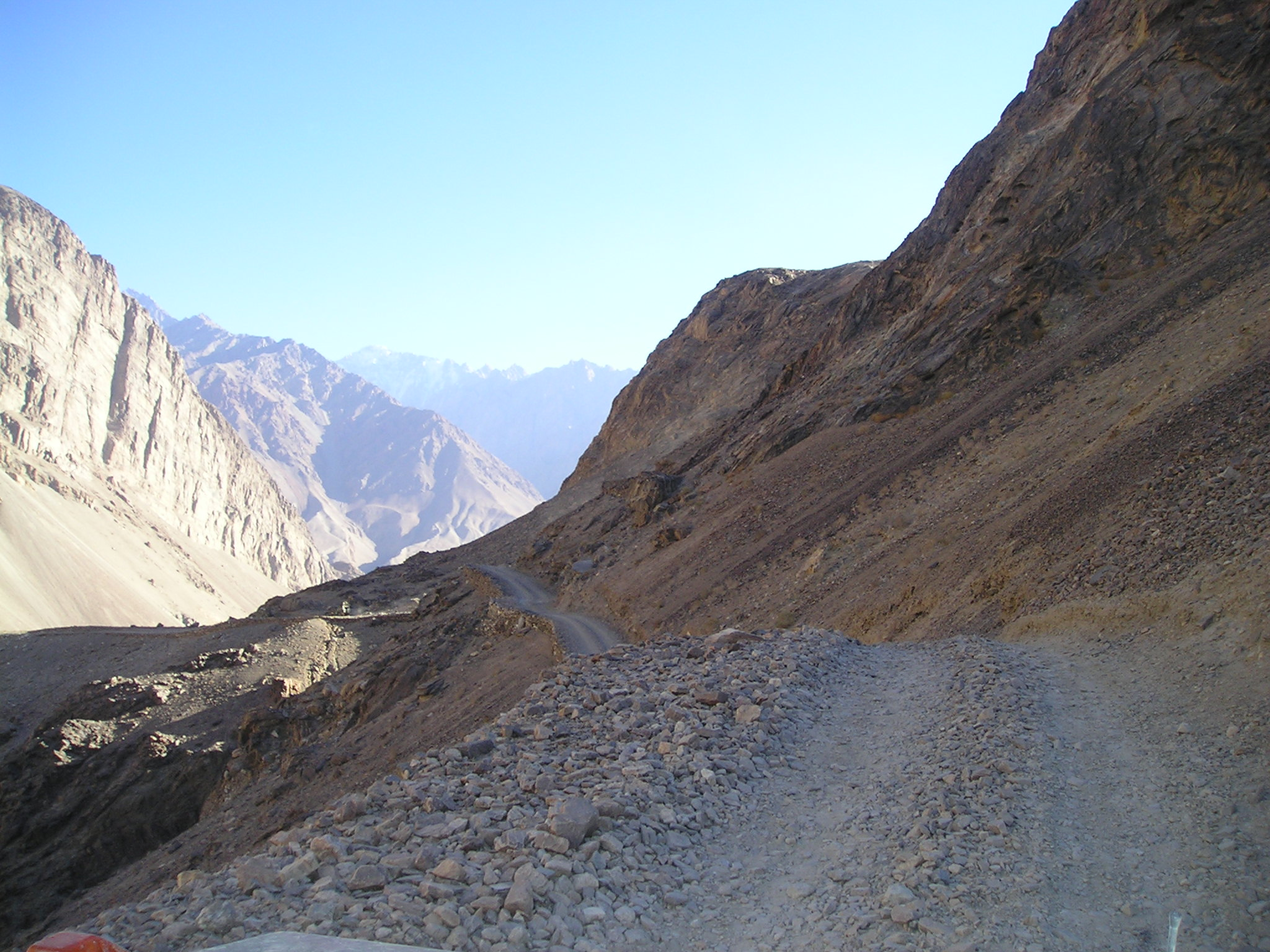
Kuran wa Munjan, road from the north to the valley.

Owing to its altitude, Kuran wa Munjan features a subarctic climate (Dsc) bordering on a tundra climate (ET) under the Köppen climate classification. It has brief, pleasant summers and very cold, snowy winters. Winters are extremely long with below-freezing months from October until May. Summers are very short and the seasonal lag in August makes it the warmest month of the year with an average temperature of 10.1 °C (50.2 °F). The coldest month January has an average temperature of −17.2 °C (1.0 °F).

The annual precipitation averages 1,098.6 millimetres (43.3 in), with August as the driest month with 17.0 millimetres (0.7 in) of rainfall, while May, the wettest month, has an average precipitation of 166.2 millimetres (6.5 in).

Climate data for Kuran wa Munjan
| Month | Jan | Feb | Mar | Apr | May | Jun | Jul | Aug | Sep | Oct | Nov | Dec | Year |
|---|---|---|---|---|---|---|---|---|---|---|---|---|---|
| Mean daily maximum °C (°F) | −12.9 (8.8) | −11.2 (11.8) | −5.8 (21.6) | −1.1 (30.0) | 3.3 (37.9) | 9.5 (49.1) | 15.7 (60.3) | 16.1 (61.0) | 12.4 (54.3) | 4.6 (40.3) | −4.5 (23.9) | −10.8 (12.6) | 1.3 (34.3) |
| Daily mean °C (°F) | −17.2 (1.0) | −15.3 (4.5) | −10.8 (12.6) | −6.4 (20.5) | −1.8 (28.8) | 4.2 (39.6) | 9.8 (49.6) | 10.1 (50.2) | 6.4 (43.5) | −1.6 (29.1) | −10.4 (13.3) | −15.6 (3.9) | −4.0 (24.7) |
| Mean daily minimum °C (°F) | −21.4 (−6.5) | −19.4 (−2.9) | −15.8 (3.6) | −11.7 (10.9) | −6.9 (19.6) | −1.2 (29.8) | 3.9 (39.0) | 4.1 (39.4) | 0.3 (32.5) | −7.7 (18.1) | −16.2 (2.8) | −20.3 (−4.5) | −9.4 (15.2) |
| Average precipitation mm (inches) | 100.4 (3.95) | 146.9 (5.78) | 141.1 (5.56) | 128.5 (5.06) | 166.2 (6.54) | 112.5 (4.43) | 43.9 (1.73) | 17.0 (0.67) | 26.8 (1.06) | 61.2 (2.41) | 81.1 (3.19) | 73.0 (2.87) | 1,098.6 (43.25) |
| Average relative humidity (%) | 79 | 83 | 84 | 78 | 70 | 59 | 46 | 39 | 40 | 53 | 71 | 75 | 65 |
Source 1: Climate-Data.org
Source 2: World Weather Online (Precipitation & Humidity)
