= List of governors of Badakhshan =

The Governor of Badakhshan (Persian: حاکم بدخشان, hākim-i badakhshān, Pashto: د بدخشان والي) is the head of the government of Badakhshan. In the late 19th century Badakhshan was joined with Qataghan into a single province and there were governors of Qataghan-Badakhshan Province and Badakhshan District. In 1963 the province was dissolved and Badakhshan became one of the 34 provinces of Afghanistan. Badakhshan province is located in the north-east of the country, between the Hindu Kush and the Amu Darya. The capital of Badakhshan and the seat of the provincial governor is the town of Fayzabad.

Traditionally, Badakhshan was ruled by a mir. In 1859 Badakhshan came under control of the Amir of Afghanistan. The mirs continued to wield power, but the Amir of Afghanistan appointed a hakim (حاکم), or governor, to rule the province. The title of Hakim was applied to numerous administrative positions in Afghanistan and several positions with different administrative responsibilities could all be called hakim. An example of this is in 1873, when administrative of Badakhshan was placed under the rule of the Hakim of Afghan Turkestan, who in turn appointed a Hakim of Badakhshan. Thus, at times the Hakim of Badakhshan has been subservient to the hakim of another region. In 1873 the Mir of Afghanistan also became a pensioner of the Kabul and ceased to hold power in Badakhshan.

In the late 19th century Badakhshan was joined with Qataghan Province into a single province named Qataghan-Badakhshan Province that had a single governor. The capital of Qataghan-Badakhshan Province and seat of the provincial governor was the town of Khan Abad, currently located in Kunduz province. Qataghan and Badakhshan were again divided in 1963 and the capital of Badakhshan reverted to Fayzabad. Some sources indicate that there may have been more than one governor appointed at a time.

== List ==
No.	Portrait	Name	Term of office		Political party	Extra	Note
No.	Portrait	Name	Took office	Left office	Political party	Extra	Note
Governors of Qataghan-Badakhshan Province
1		Sardar Abdur Rahman Khan	1863	1864	Independent (monarchy)	Abdur Rahman Khan, the future king of Afghanistan, is mentioned as the "Governor of Qataghan and Badakhshan" in Siraj al-Tawarikh, which was commissioned during his reign as Amir of Afghanistan. Holding the position of a sardar, or general, Abdur Rahman Khan ruled over Qataghan and Badakhshan while he waged a military campaign in the region.	
2		Faiz Muhammad Khan	1865	?	Independent (monarchy)		
3		Hafizullah Khan	1873	1874	Independent (monarchy)	From 1873 to 1874 Badakhshan was directly administered by the governor of Afghan Turkestan, Naib Muhammad Alam Khan. Alam Khan appointed Hafizullah Khan as governor of Badakhshan.	
4		Faiz Muhammad	May 1874	September 1874	Independent (monarchy)	In May 1874 Faiz Muhammad was appointed to relieve Hafizullah Khan as Governor of Badakhshan, but he was relieved of his appointment in September 1874.	
5		Sayyid Muhammad Khan	September 1874	?	Independent (monarchy)	In September 1874 Colonel Sayyid Muhammad Khan was appointed to relieve Faiz Muhammad as Governor of Badakhshan.	
6		Mir Mahomed Omar	1880	?	Independent (monarchy)	Abdur Rahman Khan mentions in his memoirs that Mir Mahomed Omar "Governor of Faizabad," which was then the capital of Badakhshan.	
7		Sardar Abdulla Khan	1881/1882	September 1888	Independent (monarchy)	The Siraj al-tawarıkh notes that in 1882 Sardar Abd Allah Khan Tukhi was the governor of Badakhshan and Qataghan. British archival documents from 1884 to 1885 mention a Sardar Abdulla Khan as governor of Badakhshan Lee mentions Sardar Abdulla Khan as governor of Badakhshan and Qataghan in 1888 during the rebellion of Ishaq Khan. Sardar Abdullah Khan was decisively defeated by Ishaq Khan in September 1888 and fled the battlefield.	
8		Walidad Muhammad	1880s?	?	Independent (monarchy)	Wali Muhammad served as Governor of the District of Badakhshan in the 1880s. He is a native of Qalat-i-Ghilzai	
9		Mir Ahmad Shah	1887	1887	Independent (monarchy)	At the beginning of 1887 Mir Ahmad Shah was appointed Governor of Badakhshan, but before he left Kabul to take up his appointment in Badakhshan he was demoted and Abdullah Jan took his place	
10		Abdullah Jan	1887	?	Independent (monarchy)	In 1887 Abdullah Jan was appointed governor of Badakhshan.	
11		Abdul Ahad Wardak	1910s	?	Independent (monarchy)	Wardak was the governor of Qataghan-Badakhshan Province.	
12		Azimullah Khan	1928	1928	Independent (monarchy)	Served as Governor of Qataghan-Badakhshan Province in 1928.	
13		Muhammad Sarwar	1928	1928	Independent (monarchy)	In 1928 Muhammad Sarwar was appointed Governor of Badakhshan and Qataghan, but he never took up the appointment.	
14		Safarhan (also known as Nasir Safar)	November 1929	?	Independent (monarchy)	Safarhan was appointed governor of Qataghan-Badakhshan Province following the fall of the government of Habibullāh Kalakāni. He remained in office at least through mid-1930.	
15		Shir Muhammad Nasher	1932	?	Independent (monarchy)	Shir Muhammad Nasher served as Governor of Badakhshan and Qataghan from 1932 onwards	
16		Shar Mohammed Khan	? (First documented in 1937)	?	Independent (monarchy)	American Ernest F. Fox reported meeting Shar Mohammed Khan, the Governor of Qataghan and Badakhshan, during his travels through Afghanistan in 1937.	
17		Said Abbas Khan	? (First documented in 1937)	?	Independent (monarchy)	American Ernest F. Fox reported meeting Said Abbas Khan, the Governor of Badakhshan district, during his travels through Afghanistan in 1937.	
18.		Muhammad Ismail Mayar	1938	?	Independent (monarchy)	Muhammad Ismail Mayar replaced Shir Muhammad Nasher as Governor of Badakhshan and Qataghan in 1938	
19		Ghulam Faruq	1939	?	Independent (monarchy)	Ghulam Faruq replaced Muhammad Ismail Mayar as Governor of Badakhshan and Qataghan in 1939	
20		Muhammad Gul	1940	?	Independent (monarchy)	General Muhammad Gul replaced Ghulam Faruq as Governor of Badakhshan and Qataghan in 1940	
21		Ghulam Faruq	1942	?	Independent (monarchy)	Ghulam Faruq, who served as governor from 1939 until his replacement by Muhammad Gul, was again appointed Governor of Badakhshan and Qataghan in place of Muhammad Gul in 1942	
22		Muhammad Juma Siddiq	1945	?	Independent (monarchy)	Muhammad Juma Siddiq was appointed governor of the District of Badakhshan in 1945	
23		Muhammad Hakim Shah Alami	1946	?	Independent (monarchy)	Muhammad Hakim Shah Alami replaced Ghulam Faruq as Governor of Badakhshan and Qataghan in 1946	
24		Muhammad Karim	1946	?	Independent (monarchy)	Muhammad Karim replaced Muhammad Juma Siddiq as governor of the District of Badakhshan in 1946	
25		Muhammad Sawar Khan	1948	?	Independent (monarchy)	Muhammad Sawar Khan replaced Muhammad Karim as governor of the District of Badakhshan in 1948 Jean Bowie Shor and Franc Shor reported meeting Khan in Faizabad in the summer of 1949 during their travels through Afghanistan.	
26		Muhammad Ismail Mayar	1950	1954	Independent (monarchy)	Muhammad Ismail Mayar, who served as governor until his replacement by Ghulam Faruq, replaced Muhammad Hakim Shah Alami as Governor of Badakhshan and Qataghan in 1950	
27		Muhammad Juma Siddiq	1954	1956	Independent (monarchy)	Muhammad Juma Siddiq, who had previously served as Governor of the District of Badakhshan, replaced Muhammad Karim as governor of the District of Badakhshan in 1954	
28		Muhammad Juma Siddiq	1956	1956	Independent (monarchy)	Muhammad Juma Siddiq was promoted from Governor of the District of Badakhshan to replace Muhammad Ismail Mayar as Governor of Badakhshan and Qataghan in 1956	
29		Abdur Rahman Popal	1956	1959	Independent (monarchy)	Abdur Rahman Popal replaced Muhammad Juma Siddiq as governor of the District of Badakhshan in 1956	
30		Khuda Dad Etemadi	1959	1960	Independent (monarchy)	Khuda Dad Etemadi replaced Abdur Rahman Popal as governor of the District of Badakhshan in 1959	
31		Din Muhammad Delawar	1960	1962	Independent (monarchy)	Din Muhammad Delawar replaced Khuda Dad Etemadi as governor of the District of Badakhshan in 1960	
Governors of Badakhshan Province
32		Abdul Qayyum Atai	1962	?	Independent (monarchy)	Abdul Qayyum Atai replaced Din Muhammad Delawar as governor of the District of Badakhshan in 1962	
33		Abdul Karim Seraj	1963	1963	Independent (monarchy)	General Abdul Karim Seraj (alternatively spelled Siraj) replaced Muhammad Ismail Mayar as Governor of Badakhshan and Qataghan in 1963. He was the last Governor of Badakhshan and Qataghan, which was dissolved and divided into four provinces in 1963. He then served as governor Kunduz from 1963 to 1965 following the division of Qattaghan and Badakhshan Province.	Seraj was the son of Habibullah Khan, Amir of Afghanistan from 1901 to 1919. He was born in 1912.
34		Nisar Ahmad Sherzai	1963	1967	Independent (monarchy)	Nisar Ahmad Sherzai was appointed governor of the newly created Badakhshan Province in 1963	
35		Roshandil Roshan	1967	?	Independent (monarchy)	Roshandil Roshan replaced Nisar Ahmad Sherzai as Governor of Badakhshan Province in 1967	
36		Sultan Aziz Zikria	1970	1970	Independent (monarchy)		
37		Roshandel Wardak (also spelled Roshandil Wardak)	1960s	1970s	Independent (monarchy)		
38		Sayyid Kasim	1971-?	?	Independent (monarchy)	Sayyid Kasim was appointed Governor of Badakhshan Province in 1971	
39		Taj Mohammad Wardak	1970s	1970s	Independent (monarchy)		In addition, in the mid-1960s Wardak held the position of Deputy Governor of Badakhshan Province.
40		Abdul Basir Salangi	1970s	1970s	Independent (monarchy)		
41		Habibullah Korur	1970s	May 1979	Independent		
42		Muhammad Usman Rasikh	1970s	1970s	Independent (monarchy)		
43		Abdul Aziz Azim	1960s	July 1979	Independent		
44		Ghulam Mohammed Arianpur	?	1993 (died in office)	?		Ghulam Mohammed Arianpur died in a chopper crash in 1993.
45		Mawlawi Qiamoddin Khiradmand	?	1999 † (Killed in Action)	Taliban		He was killed by the fighters of Ahmad Shah Masood's Shura-e Nezar in 1999.
46		Qazi Mohammad Sarwar/ Jamullah	1997	2001	?		Qazi Mohammad Sarwar as known Jamullah Was Deputy of Khiradmand, after Khiradmand died, He appointed as a Governor of Badakhshan Province up to 2001.
47		Mohammad Aman Hamimi	?	?	?		
48		Sayed Ikramuddin Masoomi	March 2004	?	?		Former Governor of Takhar. Became minister of Work and Social Affairs after his time as Governor of Badakshan.
49		Sayyed Mohammad Akram	21 February 2005	?	?		
50		Abdul Munshi Majid	7 April 2006	2009	Hezb-e Islami Gulbuddin		Was replaced after demonstrations which accused Majid of involvement in misusing power.
51		Baz Mohammad Ahmadi	2 May 2009	2 November 2010	Jamiat-e-Islami		Was former Governor of Ghor.
52		Shah Waliullah Adeeb	2 November 2010	25 October 2015	Jamiat-e-Islami		Member of the Jamiat-e-IslamiParty, formerly a professor at Kabul University and spokesman for Ministry of Education. Survived attack on 20 June 2011 in Ordoj District.
53		Ahmad Faisal Begzad	26 October 2015	?	?		
54		Mohammad Zakaria Sawda	?	?	?		
55.		Maulvi Amanuddin Mansoor	September 2021	7 November 2021	Taliban		
56		Maulvi Abdul Ghani Faiq	7 November 2021	25 June 2023	Taliban		
57		Qari Mohammad Ayub Khalid	25 June 2023	25 October 2025	Taliban		Was former Governor of Kunar
58		Mawlawi Ismail Ghaznawi	25 October 2025	present	Taliban		

== See also ==
- List of current governors of Afghanistan
- List of mirs of Badakhshan
