= Argo District =

Argo ارگو
- District
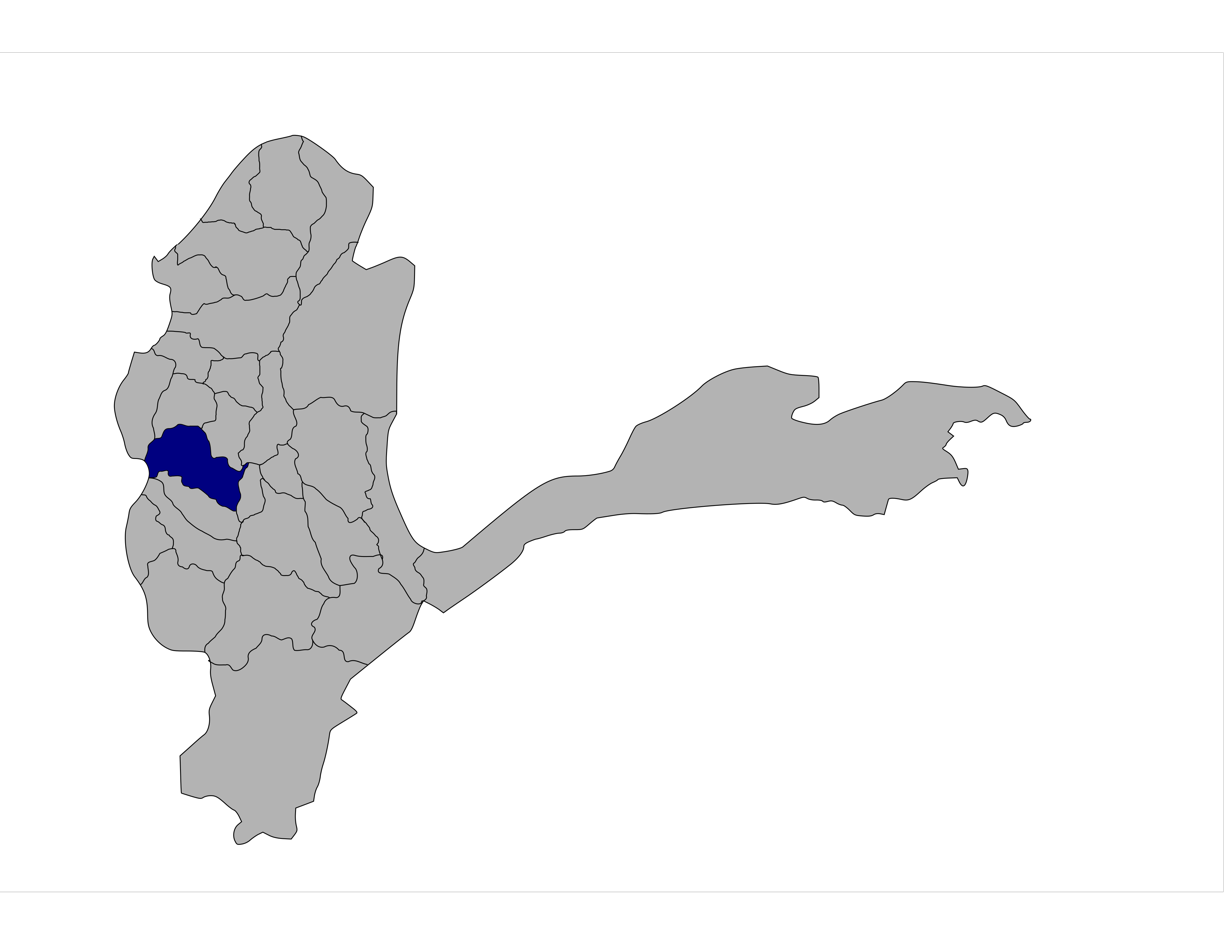
- Fayzabad District highlighted within Badakhshan Province, which Argo District split from
- Coordinates: 37°06′50″N 70°31′30″E
- Country: Afghanistan
- Province: Badakhshan

Population (2020)
  - Total: 88,616
- Time zone: UTC+04:30 (AST)

Argo District (Dari: ارگو) is one of the 28 districts in Badakhshan province, Afghanistan. It was created in 2005 from part of Fayzabad District and is home to approximately 88,616 residents.

On 2 May 2014, there were two mudslides in the district occurring on the side of a mountain, affecting the villages of either Aab Barik or Hargu.

== See also ==
- Fayzabad District
