= Yamgan District =

Coordinates: 36°25′40″N 70°47′53″E

Yamgan یمگان
- District
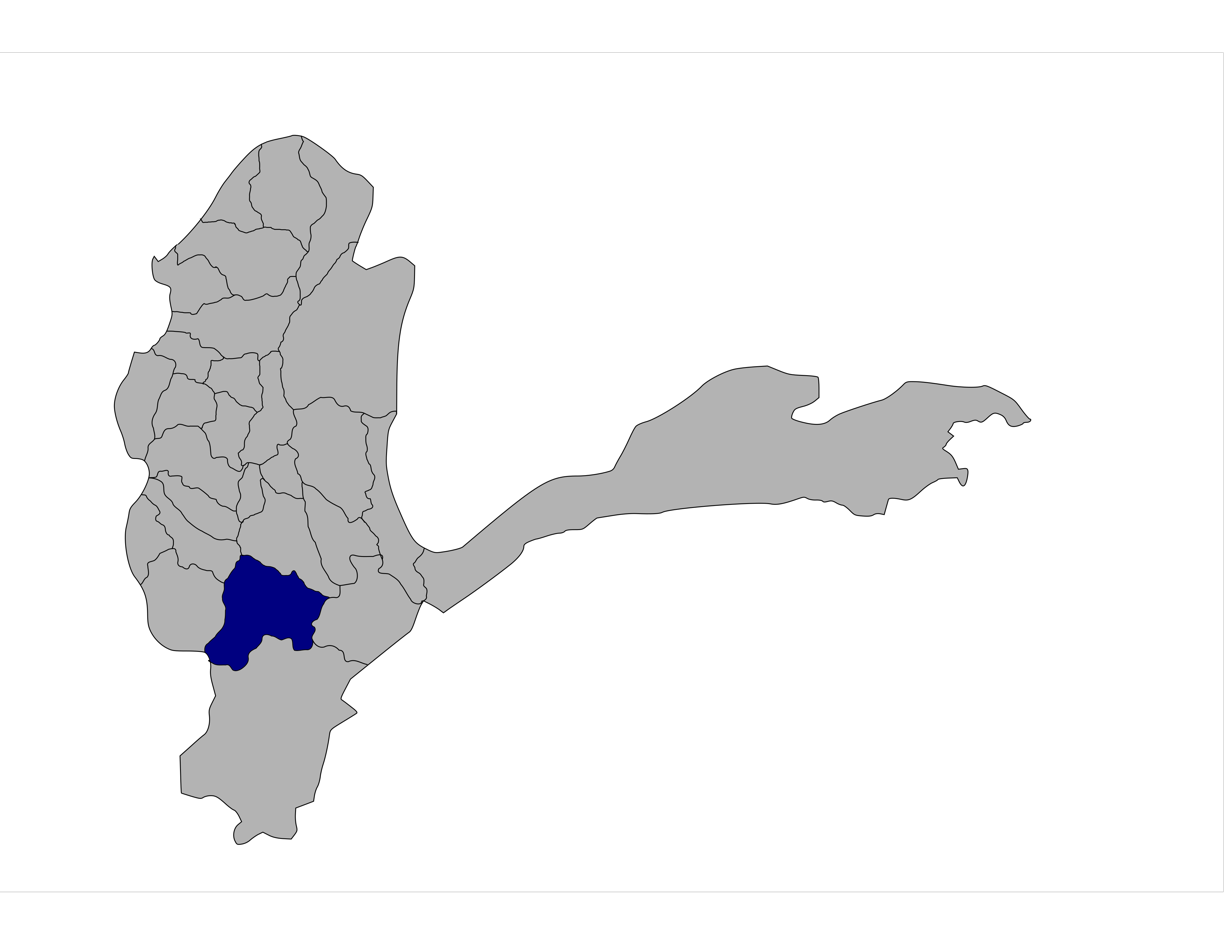
- Yamgan District was formed within Baharak District in 2005
- Country: Afghanistan
- Province: Badakhshan
- Occupation: (Afghanistan) Taliban

Government
  - Type: District council

Population
  - Estimate: 29,096

Yamgan (Dari: یمگان) is one of the 29 districts of Badakhshan Province in eastern Afghanistan. It was created in 2005 from part of the Baharak District and is home to approximately 29,096 residents, mostly Ismailis.

== History ==
During the Afghan Civil War the area was under Taliban influence from 2015 to 2019; in September of that year Afghan National Security Forces declared they had full control of the district. In late March 2020 the district was fully captured by the Taliban.

== See also ==
- Baharak district
