= Keramuddin Keram =

Afghan politician

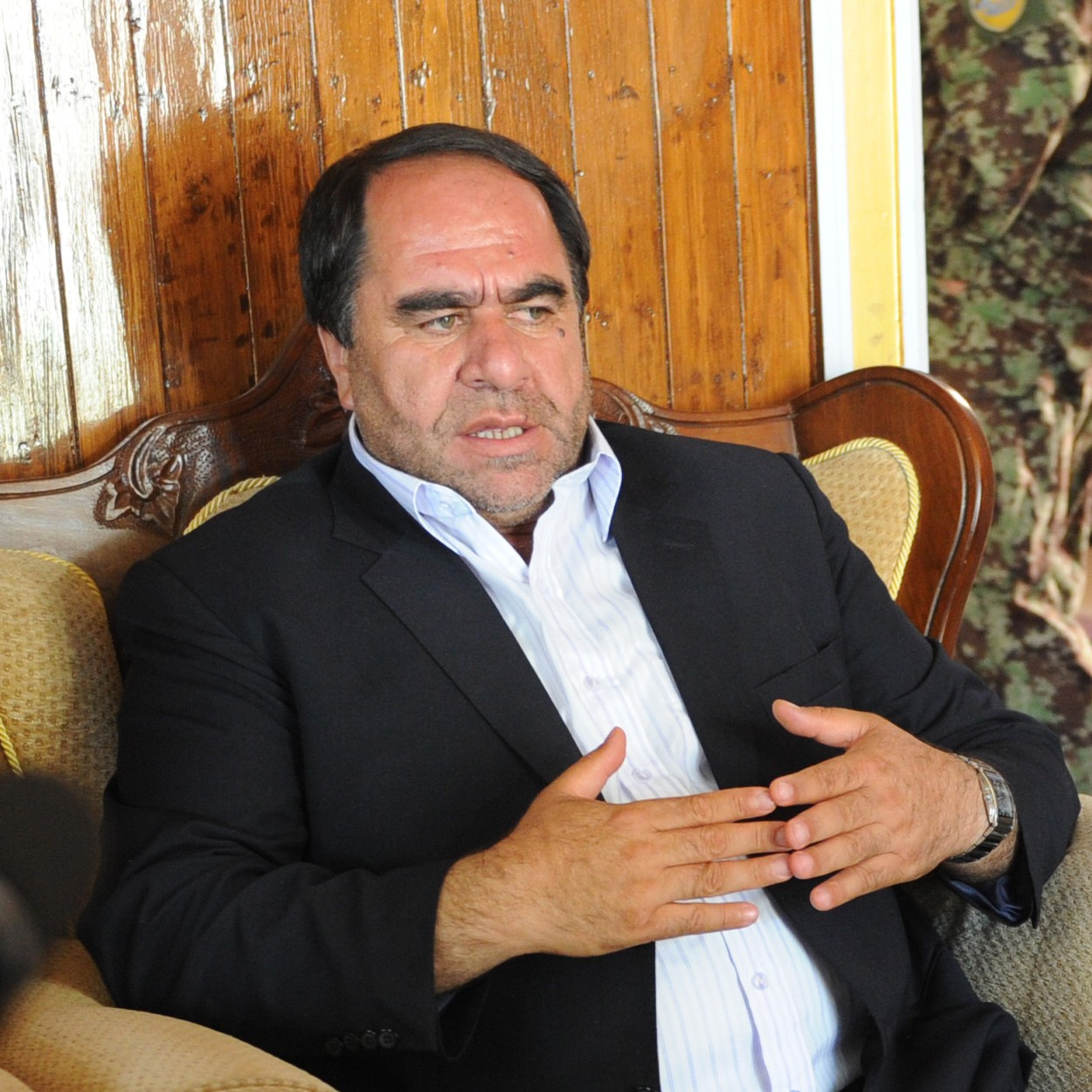
- Keramuddin Keram as Governor of Panjshir in July 2011

Governor of Panjshir, Afghanistan
- In office 21 April 2010 – 2 November 2013
- Preceded by: Hajji Bahlol
- Succeeded by: Abdul Rahman Kabiri

Personal details
- Born: 1 January 1962 (age 64) Panjshir, Afghanistan
- Occupation: President of A.F.F.(2013-2019)

Keramuddin Keram (born 1 January 1962) is an Afghan politician who served as Governor of Panjshir Province from 21 April 2010 until 2 November 2013. Keram served as the President of the Afghanistan Football Federation from 2004 until 2019, when he was banned from football for life by FIFA after being accused of sexual abuse by several players from the Afghanistan women's national football team. Despite an indictment and arrest warrant being issued against him, Keram remains at large. He pledged allegiance to the Taliban after their takeover of Afghanistan in 2021.

== Sexual assault allegations ==
In 2018, an investigation was launched when several players of Afghanistan women's national football team alleged that Karim had sexually assaulted, threatened and physically attacked them.

On June 8, 2019, FIFA barred Keram, who was president of Afghanistan's soccer association, from the sport for life after reports that he had threatened and sexually assaulted players. He was also fined about USD $1 million. Following this, a warrant was issued for his arrest.

In August 2020, special forces attempted to arrest Keram in Panjshir, but were unsuccessful, with Human Rights Watch reporting that Keram had the protection of a local militia. Only on August and September 2021 he resurfaced allegedly to assist the Taliban to defeat the Islamic Republic government forces in Panjshir after the Taliban's takeover of Kabul and since then he pledged allegiance to the Taliban government.

== See also ==
- Politics of Afghanistan
- List of current governors of Afghanistan
- Provinces of Afghanistan

| Preceded by Hajji Bahlol | Governor of Panjshir, Afghanistan; April 21, 2010-November 2, 2013 | Succeeded by Muhammad Arif Sarwari |
