= Ortoq =

Ortoq may refer to:

- Ortogh, a merchant partner of the Mongols and nomads
- Artuk Bey, a Seljuk commander

== See also ==
- Muhammad Hashim Ortaq, en engineer and former politician of Afghanistan
