= Muhammad Asif Jalali =

Afghan comedian (1957–2020)

- محمد آصف جلالی
- Born: 1957; Kapisa province
- Died: January 1, 2020 (aged 62–63); Kabul
- Notable work: TV1 Presenter- Late Night Show host - Stand up comic

Comedy career
- Years active: 2009-2018
- Genre: Comedy
- Subject: Late Night Show with Asif Jalali

Muhammad Asif Jalali was an Afghan comedian TV presenter. He worked as a comedian but after the popularity of TV in Afghanistan, he was a TV personality and presenter. Jalali started his professional career in a comedy program called “Khanda Bazar,” which was aired by TOLO TV eight years ago. Later on, he started working with other Afghan media outlets. Before "Khanda Bazar" he worked with TV1 in a program as a late night host called "Shabkhand"

== Early life ==
Asif Jalali was born in 1957 in Kapisa province, but grew up in Logar province, Afghanistan. He spent most of his life in Kabul. Asif Jalali graduated from Kabul Polytechnic University. He studied theater and cinema as an amateur and appeared for the first time in a program on the National Radio and Television of Afghanistan. He also starred in several films. During the Taliban regime, he recorded and marketed his comedy programs outside Afghanistan. After the fall of the Taliban government, he ran the Shabkhand program on TV One. He recently hosted Khandistan program a comedy show on Afghanistan TV.

== Death ==
Asif Jalali died of cardiac arrest.
