= Kabul Polytechnic University =

University in Kabul, Afghanistan

- دانشگاه پولی تخنیک کابل / د کابل پولی تخنیک پوهنتون
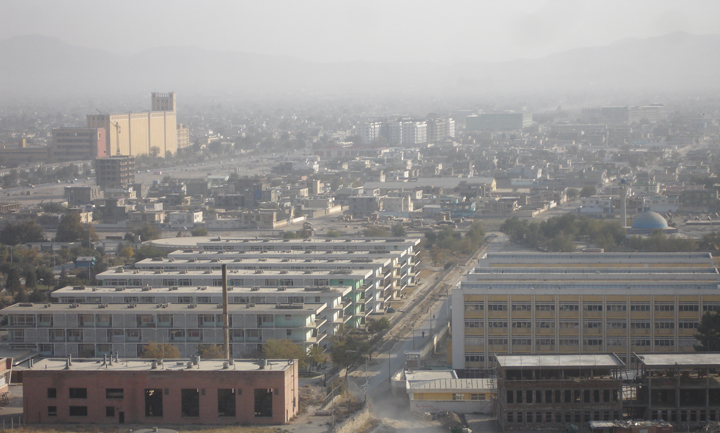
- Close-up view of some of KPU's buildings in November 2005
- Established: October 13, 1963
- Chancellor: Abdul Rashid Iqbal
- Administrative staff: 125 teachers
- Students: 547 new, 900 continuing
- Location: Kart-e Mamorin, District 5, Kabul, Afghanistan; 34°32′06″N 69°07′11″E
- Campus: 60 ha (150 acres)
- Website: kpu.edu.af/en

The Kabul Polytechnic University (Note: Pashto: د کابل پولی تخنیک پوهنتون Dari: دانشگاه پولی تخنیک کابل) (KPU) is one of the major public universities in Kabul, Afghanistan. Established in 1963 on a 72 ha (180 acres) of land to the east of Bagh-e Bala Palace, it became one of the largest and well-known higher education institutions in the country. It was originally called Kabul Polytechnic Institute and considered by many as an important institution for providing higher education and training to future engineers. Its current chancellor is Abdul Rashid Iqbal.

KPU has 8 faculties and 20 departments (courses) that include 12 professional and 8 general subjected departments. The university buildings include classrooms, laboratory, library, dormitory, place for professors, cafeteria with 1,000 capacity, mosque with 500 capacity, sport facility, conference room with 1,000 capacities, workshop and leisure center.

Some of the buildings at the university were built by engineers from both Afghanistan and the then-Soviet Union. After completion of teaching classrooms and laboratory in 1967, the university began to offer educational service and in the year of 1972 for the first time students from this university graduated. Until 1980 students at KPU studied up to bachelor level, and until 1992 students could study master level in the field of engineering. In this period people were educated to PhD level. Upon reopening in 2002, it was renamed Kabul Polytechnic University. It became the second largest university in Afghanistan after Kabul University.

KPU is the basic center for training professional engineering cadres in Afghanistan. It has provided BSc, MSc and PhD degrees to thousands of students in the professions of constructing civil and industrial buildings, hydro technical buildings, road construction, architecture, geology and exploration of mines, chemical technology, engineering geodesy, building automobile and tractor, and power electric supply for industrial institutions. KPU provides clean drinking water to around 70,000 Kabul houses.

== Partnership ==
During the Islamic Republic of Afghanistan, KPU established a partnership with the University of Nebraska Omaha and University of Nebraska–Lincoln, which are located in the United States. Funds for the partnership was provided by USAID through FHI 360.

== Faculties ==
- Geology and Mines Faculty
- Construction Faculty
- Electromechanics Faculty
- Computer Science Faculty
- Chemical industrial Engineering Faculty
- Water and Environmental Engineering Faculty
- Transportation Engineering Faculty
- Geomatics Engineering Faculty

== Notable alumni ==
- Abdul Ahad Momand, former Afghan Air Force aviator and astronaut
- Mohammad Daoud, former governor of Helmand province
- Mohammad Alim Qarar, former member of Afghan parliament
- Muhammad Arif Sarwari, former Afghan intelligence official and politician
- Muhammad Hashim Ortaq, former member of Afghan parliament
- Abdul Rahim Sayed Jan, former Afghan communications minister
- Muhammad Yunus Nawandish, former mayor of Kabul
- Gulbuddin Hekmatyar, former Afghan prime minister

== See also ==
- List of universities in Afghanistan
