= Architecture of Afghanistan =

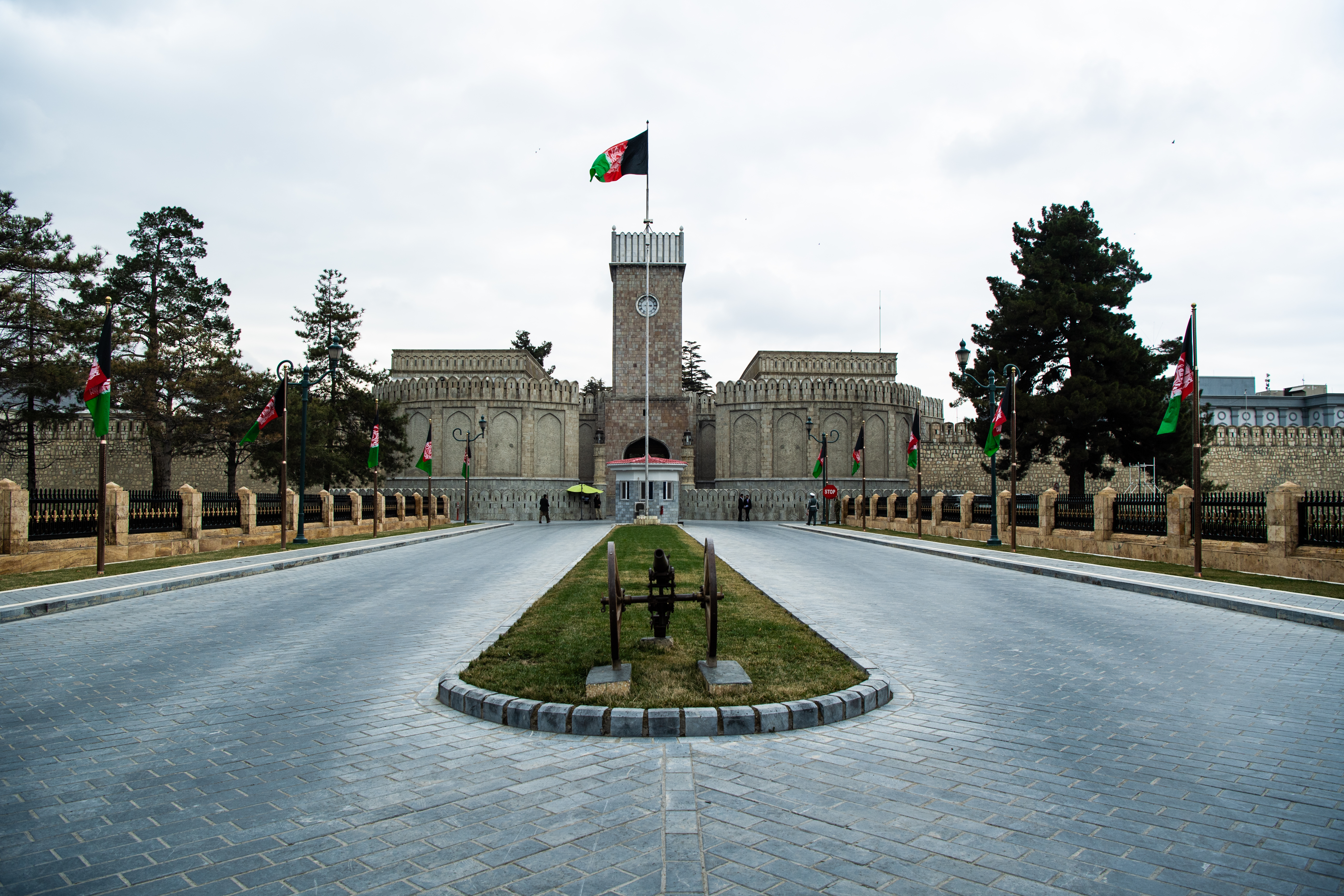
Afghanistan's presidential palace, a modern complex with a glimpse to the countries diverse styles of architecture.

The architecture of Afghanistan refers to a distinct style of architecture of the modern country and its predecessor states. As the connection between the three major cultural and geographic centers of Central Asia, the Indian subcontinent, and the Iranian plateau, the boundaries of the region prior to this time changed with the rapid advancement of armies, with the land belonging to a vast range of empires over the last two millennia.

The diversity of Afghan history allows for the diverse and at the same time unique style that exists in the country's architecture and architectural remains, with influences ranging over time from Greek to Persian, to Indian and European in recent centuries. A range of religious influences over time are also reflected, with evidence primarily exhibiting early Buddhist, Zoroastrian and Islamic inspiration.

== Architectural origins ==
With the advent of the Iron Age in Central Asia the first indications of circular city planning is evident, typical across the Iranian plateau from this point. The circular form most likely had defensive intent as their origin. Parts of the major historical cities such as Balkh and Kandahar have evidence of ramparts with foundations dated back to this period, with characteristic mud-brick construction and towers at regular intervals. A citadel was also commonly situated within the center of these structures, evidence that these settlements also operated as administrative centers and market places. This tradition of defensive architecture was spread and maintained across much of Central Asia from these beginnings.

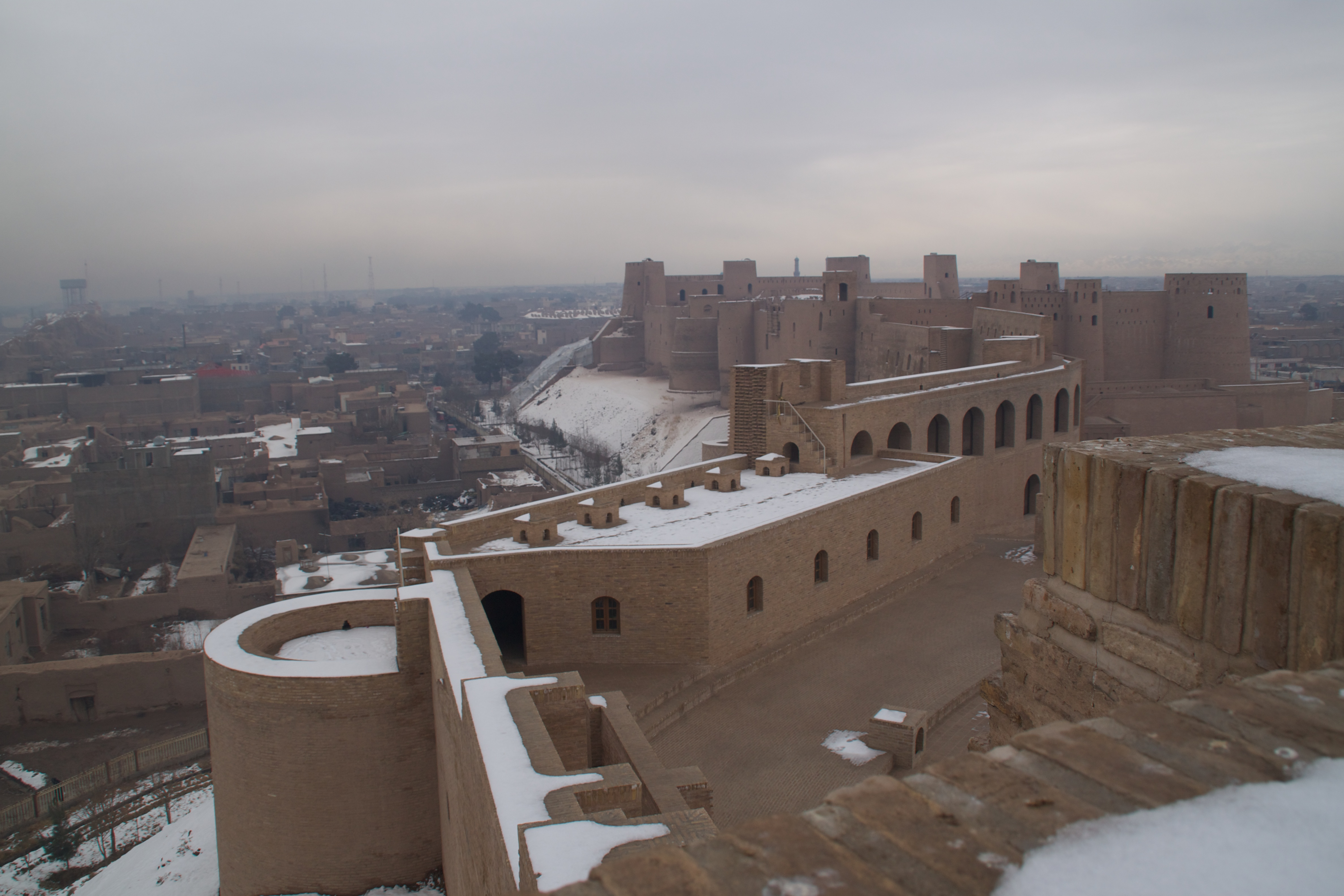
Grand citadel of Herat.

=== Hellenic influence ===
Following Alexander the Great's conquest of the region in the 4th century BC and the subsequent rule of his Seleucid generals, Hellenistic influences strengthened previously extant connections to the West. This was particularly evident in the north of the region, while Mauryan rule continued in the south. Although temples retained their distinct classic Buddhist form, evidence of Greek architects are extant in the decoration and layout of the structures, with sculptures being the key manifestation of Western art. The Greeks also influenced town planning with the introduction of the agora, or city center square, with this tradition further developed in under the later Timurid rule creating an advanced architecture in design of cities.

== Early Buddhist architecture ==
The arrival of the originally nomadic Yuezhi tribes from Central Asia and establishment of Kushan Empire added a new element to the already nature of the architecture of Afghanistan as the country was turned into the center Buddhism under Kanishka the Great. The establishment of the Kushan empire invigorated existing traditions and reasserted international connections [...] encouraging the spread of Buddhist architecture in Afghanistan.

— Warwick Ball, The Monuments of Afghanistan, London 2008

With the establishment of the Kushan empire both political and dynastic centers were established, with one such dynastic center identified in Afghanistan at Surkh Kotal, established during the height of Buddhism in Afghanistan. Excavations of the site revealed a monumental set of stairs leading down the hillside from a Kushan temple, with these built in the first half of the 2nd century AD. Zoroastrian associations are possibly evident in fire worship symbols, and exist alongside Buddhist architectural features. Hellenistic pilasters and column bases alongside a limestone with Greek letter inscriptions of an unknown language are evidence of Western influence, while Iranian influences may also exist within the concept of a monumental dynastic centre.

Artificial cave structures were a primary feature of Buddhist communities, reaching its zenith through the adoption of Buddhism by Hephthalites with the caves utilized as sanctuaries and cells for Buddhist monks. The most prominent example of these in Afghanistan are in Bamiyan Province, which became the capital of Buddhism in the 4th century AD under Hephthalite rule. Hundreds of these such caves exist at this site, which is also notable for its immense Buddha statues and their public destruction by the Taliban in 2001.

=== The stupa ===
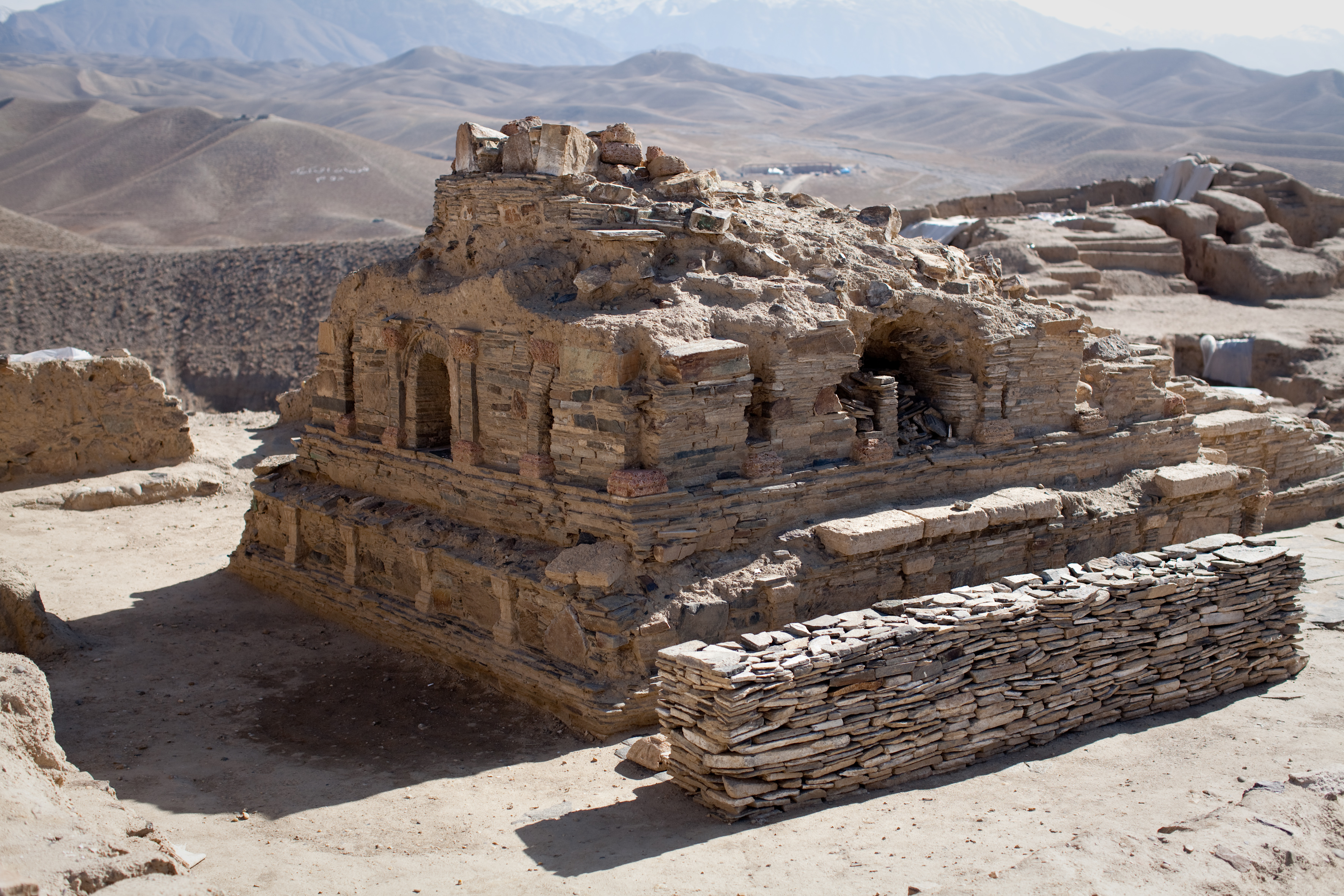
Stupa excavated 35km from Kabul, Afghanistan

Within this period came the widespread construction of the stupa, a key architectural form of the early Buddhist period. This structure developed from the original earthen mounds built in north-eastern India following the death of Buddha, with the role of the structure progressing from a commemorative reliquary to a place of worship itself. This occurred around the 3rd century BC with the opening of the original stupas by Emperor Ashoka in order to utilise relics to disseminate the religion, coinciding with the dissemination of the structure itself. With this development of purpose came a lengthy and complex development of form, from an earthen mound to solid masonry structures consisting of a square base beneath a hemispheric dome. Eventually, this form came to be dwarfed by an adornment of a mast featuring seven umbrella-like discs, or chakras, each representing a different layer of heaven. These structures were rarely isolated, with other stupas and traditional Buddhist monasteries and chapels commonly in the vicinity.

Despite the incorporation of much of Afghanistan into the Sassanian empire in the 3rd century AD, the region was never fully conquered and regional architectural development was relatively unaffected. The Sassanids were succeeded through the invasion of the Hephthalites in the 5th century AD. There is some conjecture around the extent to which the destructive nature of the Hephthalites extended to their time in Afghanistan, although scholars agree that local Buddhist influence was not totally eliminated in this period. Buddhism therefore continued in the region until the arrival of Islam with the Abbasids. Despite the prominence and duration of Buddhist influence in Afghanistan prior to this period, the religion and any influence it had on architectural structures was eliminated under Islamic rule.

== Early Islamic architecture ==
The initial spread of Islam in northern Afghanistan occurred around the 8th century AD, under the Abbasid rule. With the decline of Abbasids and local Iranic Muslim dynasties rose to power. One of the earliest of these dynasties was Saffarids that fully conquered Afghanistan and defeated the Shahi dynasty of Kabul, the Islamization process continued under Samanids. Following this point in time Afghanistan was established as the center of Islamic civilization under the Ghaznavid Empire, succeeded by the Ghorids until 1219.

=== The mausoleum ===
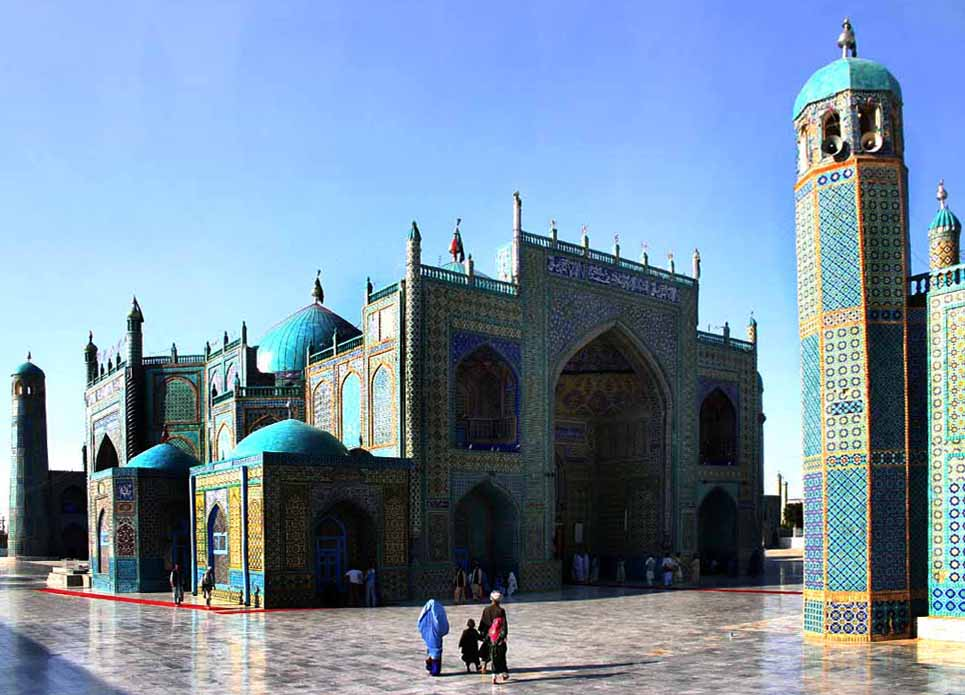
Mausoleum at Mazar-I Sharif

The mausoleum was a significant Islamic structure, with the great distance between the Afghanistan region and Mecca elevating the structures enshrining holy men to alternative focal points for the required pilgrimage to the city. At Mazar-i Sharif there exists evidence of this in the great shine of 'Ali, the fourth Sunni rightly guided Caliph, which today remains a point of great pilgrimage for the Sunni Muslim population in Afghanistan. The form of a mausoleum typically involved either a domed square chamber or a conical cupola atop a tower. An iwan, an ornamental vaulted entrance portal, was a common later additions subsequently a key feature. The iwan originated in pre-Islamic Central Asia, and saw itself incorporated into many mausoleum and mosque designs with the Islamic expansion, particularly in architecture of the later Timurid period. It was also maintained as a prominent feature of secular architecture, with pre-Islamic evidence in the palace architecture at Ai Khanum, and a later Islamic example at the 12th century AD Ghaznavid palace at Lashkari Bazar. The dome was another essential form utilised particularly in mausoleums and mosques.

=== The mosque ===
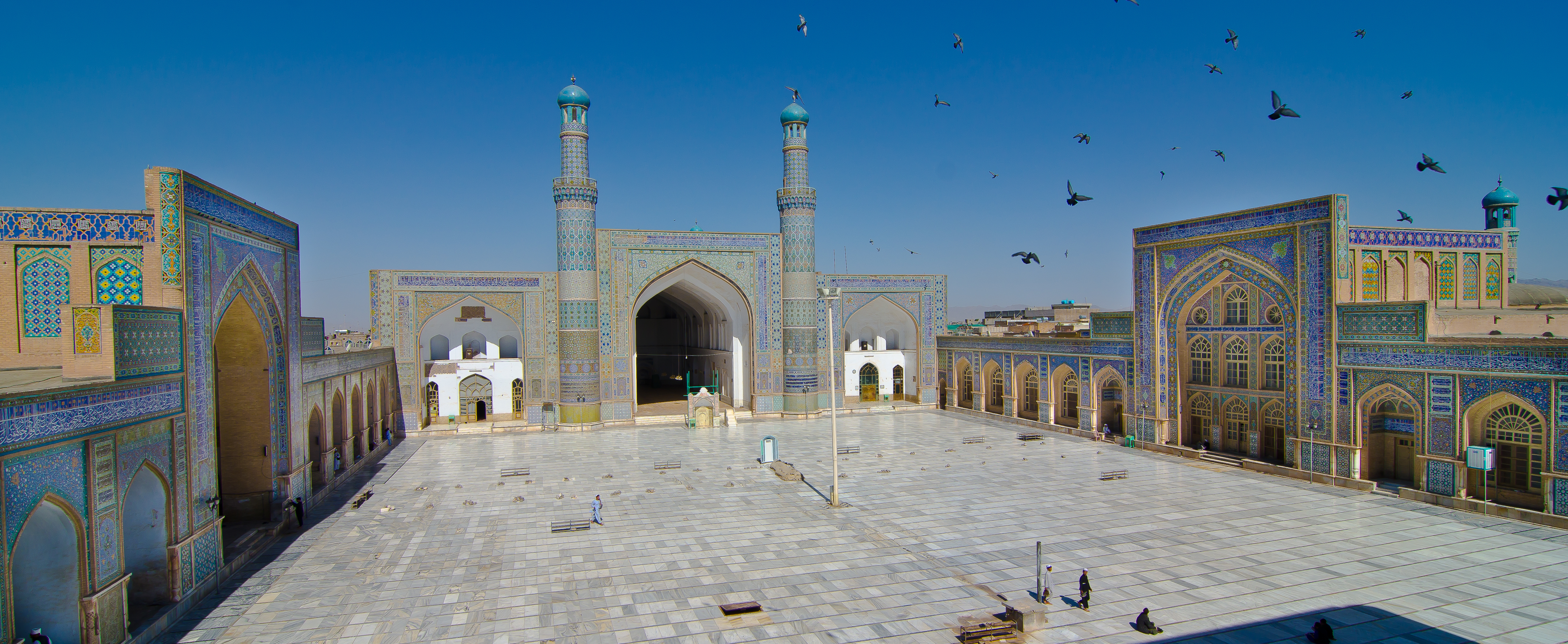
Mosque of Herat, Afghanistan. View from the Eastern roof top. (2011)

Another key impact of Islamic rule on the architecture in Afghanistan was the introduction of the universal religious building of the mosque, with aspects of the basic structure dictated by the religion itself. A mosque must face Mecca, or qibla, the direction of prayer, and contain a mihrab or prayer niche within the qibla wall. An ablution area allows for the requirement of cleanliness before prayer, and a clean, covered floor allows for the touching of the head on the ground during prayer. With the Qur'an restricting depictions of animals or the human form, decoration of Islamic structures evolved with a more abstract aspect than previous eras. Much of this decoration utilized the literal text of the Qur'an.

A markedly Iranian influence is notable in the subsequent Ghaznavid and Ghorid periods, were tiles were arranged to form decorative inscriptions making up entire walls, a tradition later greatly developed in the Timurid era. Mosques were generally based on a four-iwan plan with a central dome chamber. The oldest Islamic structure in Afghanistan is a square, nine-domed mosque at Balkh, built by the Abbasids in the 9th century AD.

=== The minaret ===
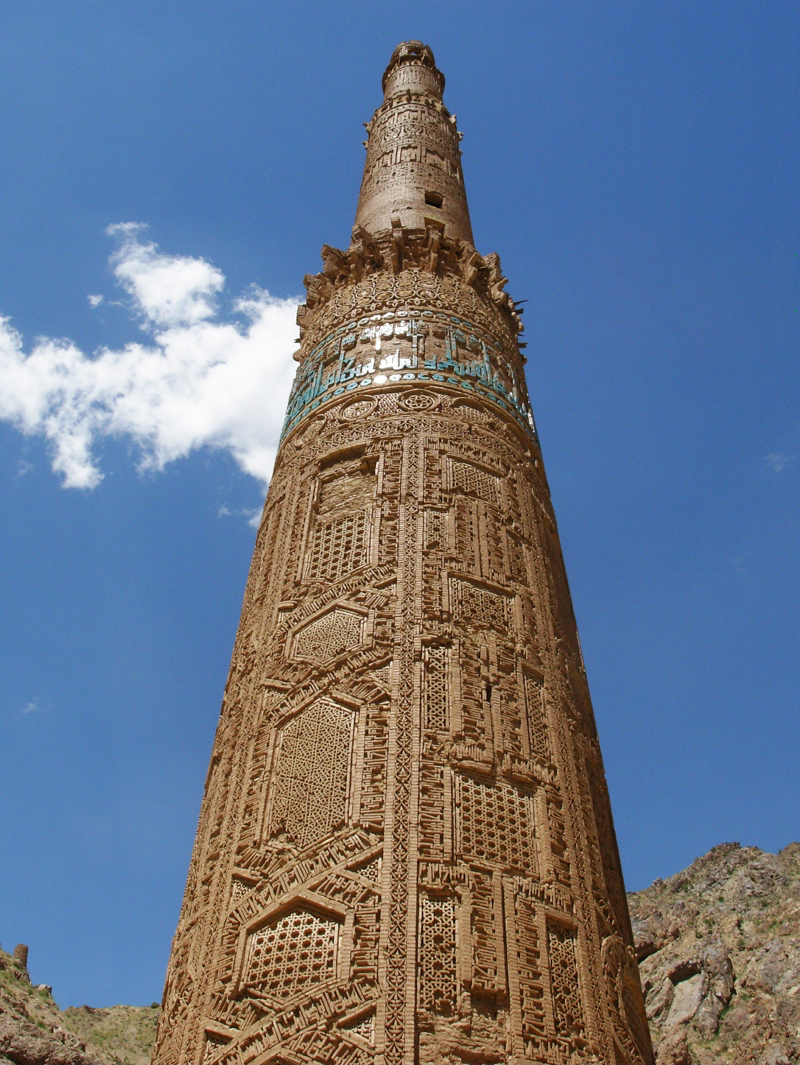
Ghorid minaret at Jam

The 65-metre Ghorid minaret at Jam – one of two surviving monuments in Afghanistan from this period – and the two minarets at Ghazni are often cited as the most exceptional examples of this Islamic architectural tradition. These particular minarets themselves are also evidence of the variety in form that existed in minaret erection, with the former a colossal three-story minaret and the two latter small and star-shaped. With their height serving the purpose of marking the site of a religious structure, minarets almost always accompanied a mosque, and could either exist in connection to it or freestanding.

There were few monuments in Afghanistan from the Abbasid, Saffarid, Ghaznavid, Seljuk, Ghorid, and Khwarezmian periods to survive the later destruction with the coming of the Mongols, although examples of Ghaznavid, Ghorid and Seljuk architecture remain and continued in India during this period under the Sultans of Ghor.

== Timurid architecture ==
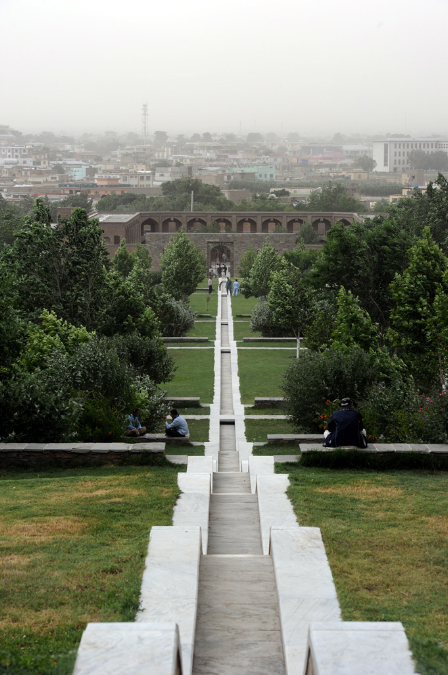
Garden of Babur, tomb of Babur emir of Kabul and first Mughal emperor

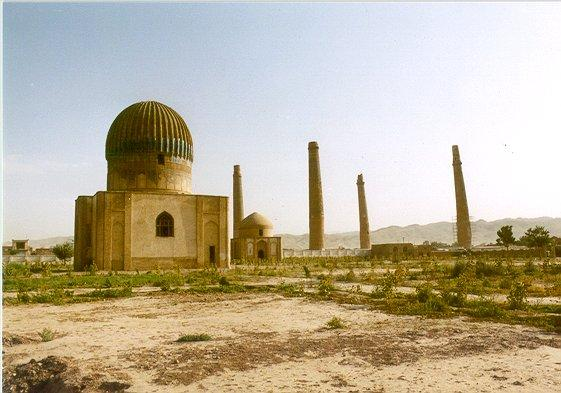
Remains of Musalla Complex, built by the order of Gawhar shad, Queen consort to Shahroukh shah.

In 1219, the Ghorid empire was overthrown in Afghanistan with the invasion of the Genghis Khan. As well as causing widespread destruction "leaving Afghanistan in ruins", the coming of the Mongols halted the development of new architecture as virtually all artistic activity in the region was eliminated. This remained the case until Timur assumed leadership of the Mongols in the late 14th century AD. Although subjecting the land to wars similar to those experienced under Genghis, Timur is also accredited with initiating the rebuilding of some of the regions culturally significant urban centres ruined by the Mongol conquest. Administration of this did not really occur in Afghanistan until the beginning of the 15th century AD with the reign Timur's son Shah Rukh, where Timur's capital at Samarkand in present-day Uzbekistan served as key inspiration for Shah Rukh's capital at Herat.

Not much development occurred in the way of architectural form with comparison to design prior to the Mongol invasion. Reliance on the dome and iwan for the basis of structural design continued, with some evolutions: for example, the double dome became frequently used, where the iwan developed into a monumental entrance hall. Mosques rarely varied from the pre-Mongol design consisting of four iwans and a dome chamber forming the main prayer hall. These features accompany an emphasis throughout the Timurid period on gigantisms and the conspicuous. Evidence of this remains in Samarkand with the colossal mosque of Bibi Khanum, built in honor of Timur's Chinese wife.

Unlike architecture, considerable change did occur in the decoration and ornamentation of structures and monuments. Although small bricks had been utilized during the Ghaznavid and Ghorid periods, a key innovation of the Timurids was the introduction of glazed and polychrome tiles. Colors began with turquoise, white and royal blue and were followed by a myriad of shades and pigments, with these arranged into complicated and intertwining geometrical girikhs or knots. Featured designs included floral motifs, depictions of mountains and clouds, and ornamentation inspired by Chinese art. A preserved example of glazed tilework mihrab exists in the mosque of Hauz-i Karboz.

There has probably never been a period in the history of world architecture when colour and form achieve such a perfect balance of design and meaning as they did under the Timurids during the reign of Shah Rukh.

— J.D. Hoag, Islamic Architecture, London 1987

== Contemporary architectural education ==
Today Afghanistan is not a landscape littered with stylistic artefacts, but a true context of complexity, conflict and chaos. The ruins of medieval monuments lie side by side with buildings inspired by western stylistic features informed by modernism, postmodernism and deconstructivism.

— Theodore Sawruk, University of Hartford

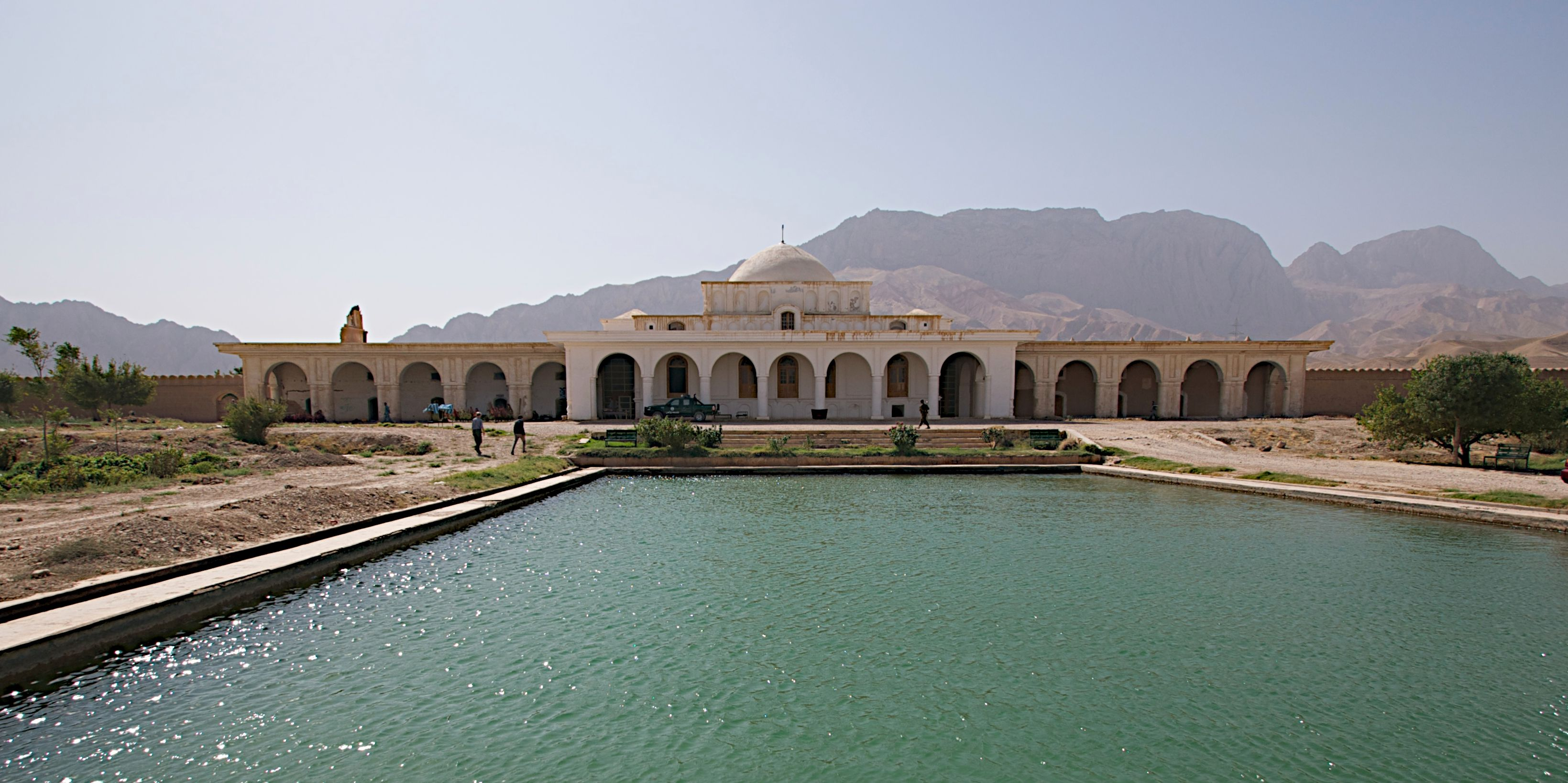
Indian colonial style palace of Jahan Numa in Kholm

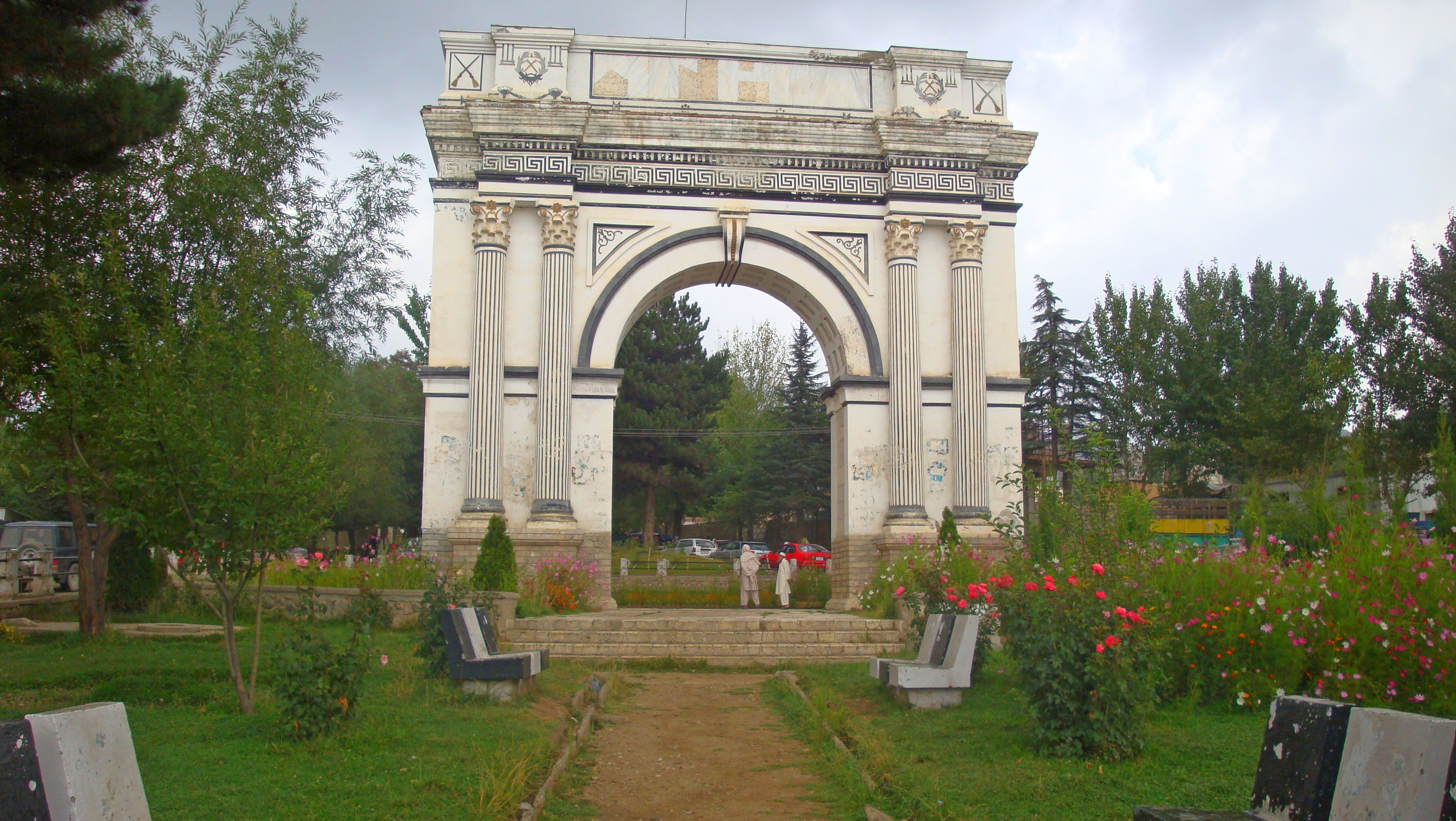
Taq-e Zafar in Neoclassical style, one of several European styles introduced in the 1920s

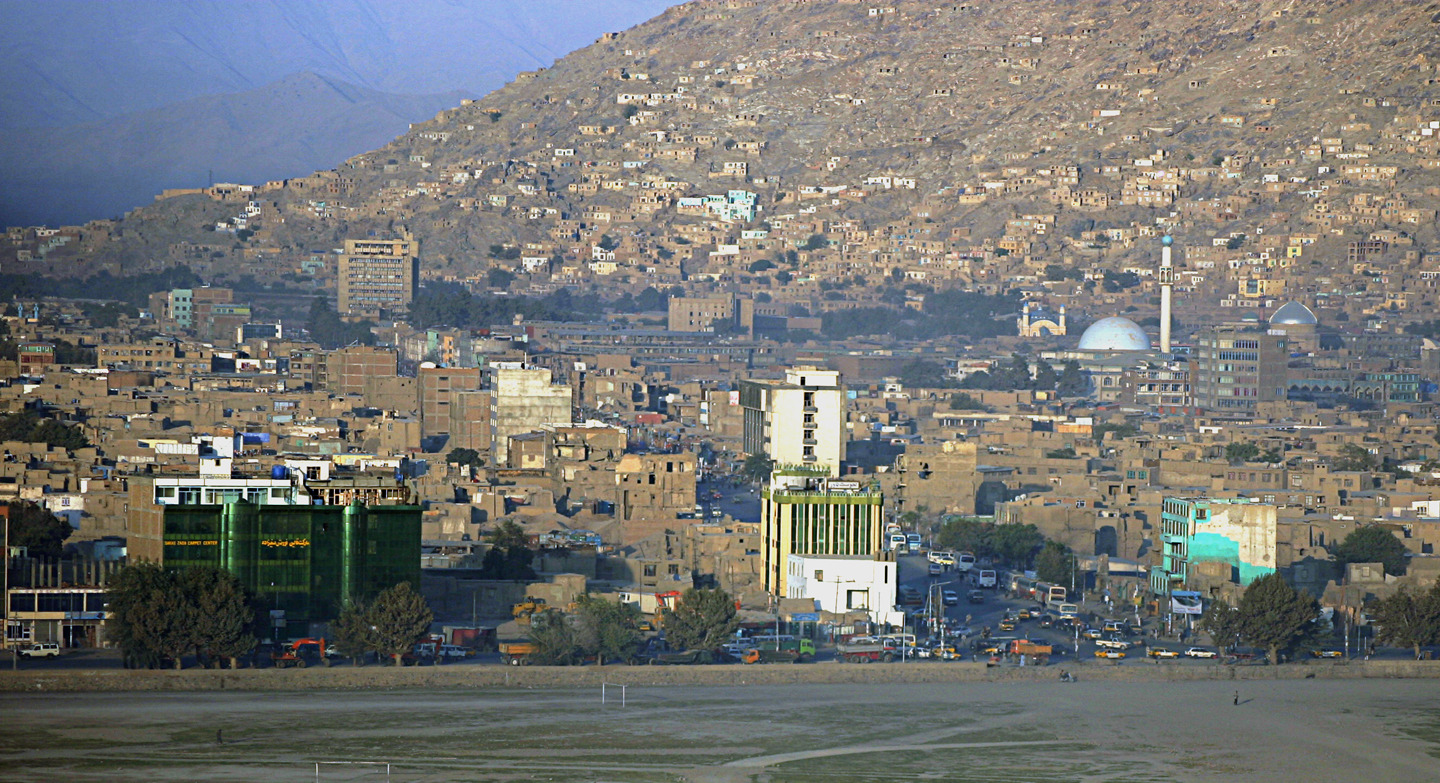
Kabul skyline, displaying both historical and contemporary buildings

Beginning with the Soviet Invasion of Afghanistan in 1979, decades of war and destruction ensued in Afghanistan. This impacted architecture both through the destruction of historical buildings as well as the degradation of architectural education and engineering programs in the country's universities. With support from USAID, higher education in the field of architecture was introduced as a department under the Engineering Faculty at Kabul University in 1968. Both the Department of Architecture and the Engineering Faculty at Kabul University were not sustained after the Soviet invasion of Afghanistan in 1979, with focus shifting in 1980 to the Soviet-modelled Kabul Polytechnic Institute for architectural education. Here the Department of Architecture was closed after five years with the graduation of the 1985 cohort. Following the Soviet withdrawal in 1988, President Najibullah's government reinitiated the Engineering Faculty at Kabul University, with architectural education then available only at Kabul University and Kabul Polytechnic Institute despite the establishment of other universities across the country, such as at Herat and Kandahar. Education was hindered in Kabul due to unrest in the city, during which large parts of the city were also destroyed.

In 2007, the University of Hartford College of Engineering, Technology and Architecture received funds to establish an architecture program and to rejuvenate the engineering program at the University of Herat. Theodore Sawruk, who travelled to Herat as one of the lead figures of the endeavor, noted that architecture as a profession had been replaced through the decades of war with engineering, where engineers had little design education due to an emphasis on practicality. This also lead to limited focus on restoration and historic preservation, which were incorporated into the program at the University of Herat along with courses surrounding stone masonry and Islamic architecture.
