= Hamdullah Nomani =

Mayor of Kabul

Hamdullah Nomani حمد الله نعمانی

Mayor of Kabul
- Incumbent
- Assumed office 24 August 2021
- Deputy: Maulvi Abdul Rashid
- Preceded by: Mohammad Daud Sultanzoy

Personal details
- Born: Sipayaw village, Andar District, Ghazni Province
- Party: Taliban
- Profession: Politician

Hamdullah Nomani is the mayor of Kabul since August 24, 2021, replacing Mohammad Daud Sultanzoy. He also served in the same position during the earlier Islamic Emirate of Afghanistan.

== Early life ==
Hamdullah Nomani was born around 1968 in Sipayaw village, Andar District, Ghazni Province.

== Political career ==
Nomani served as Minister of Higher Education and member of the Leadership Council.

In September 2021, Nomani ordered women civil servants to stay home.
