= Muhammad Yunus Nawandish =

Afghan politician and engineer

Muhammad Yunus Nawandish محمديونس نوانديش Builder of Kabul
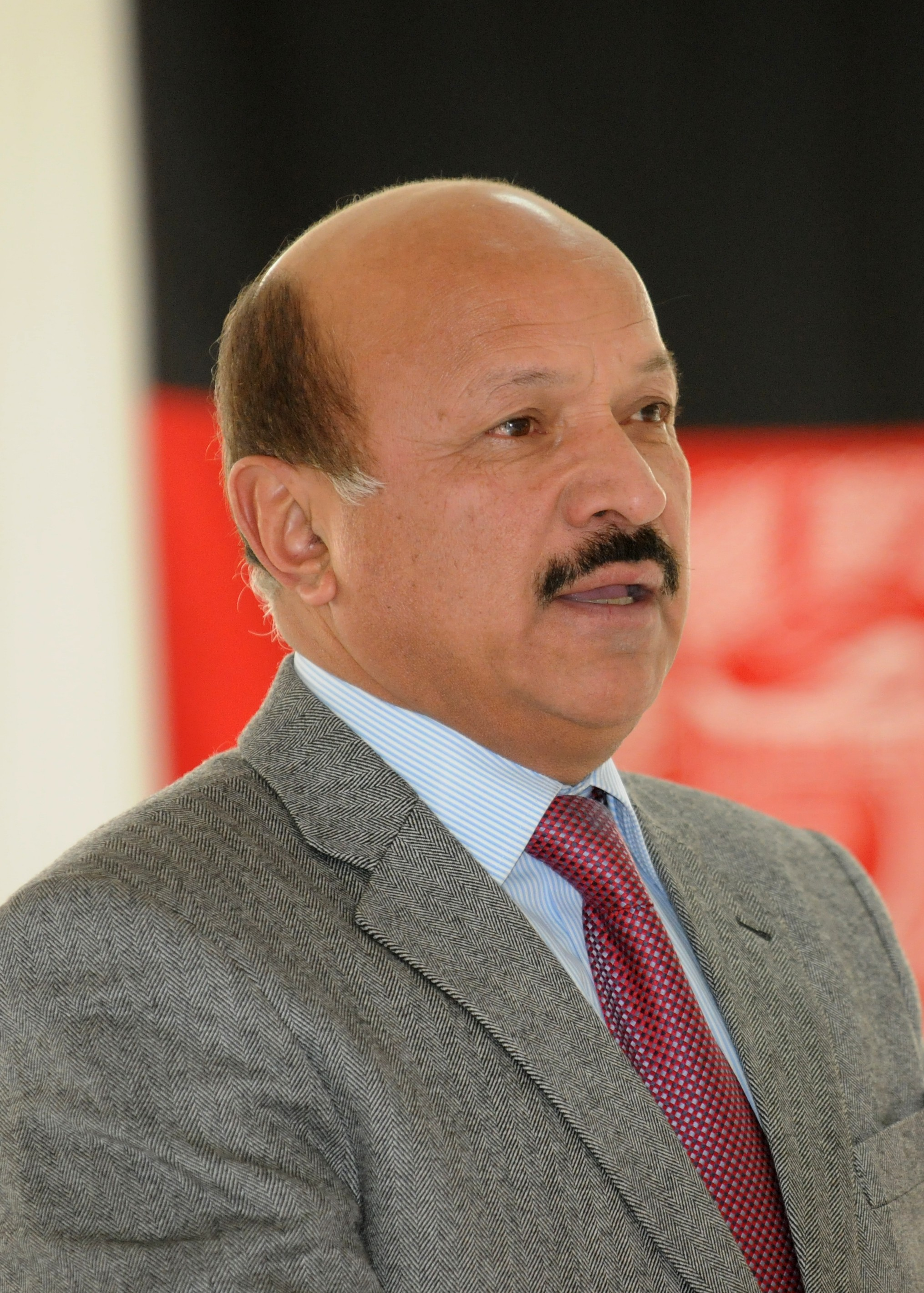
- Muhammad Yunus Nawandish speaking in 2010

Mayor of Kabul
- In office 4 January 2010 – 1 April 2020
- President: Hamid Karzai; Ashraf Ghani
- Preceded by: Abdul Ahad Sayebi
- Succeeded by: Mohammad Daud Sultanzoy

USAID
- In office 2005–2009

Deputy Minister of Water and Energy
- In office 2001–2005

Professor of Engineering in Balkh University
- In office 1992–1994

Personal details
- Citizenship: Afghanistan
- Education: Polytechnical University of Kabul
- Occupation: Politician, Engineer, Lecturer

Muhammad Yunus Nawandish (Uzbek/Dari: محمديونس نوانديش) was the Mayor of Kabul from after his appointment by Afghan President Hamid Karzai in January 2010. During his time in office the Mayor initiated an aggressive program of municipal improvements in streets, parks, greenery, revenue collection, environmental control, and solid waste management.

He was assisted in his municipal reform efforts by the USAID's “Kabul City Initiative” project, the World Bank, Japanese Government JICA and other International Donors to build municipal capacity, improve service delivery and infrastructure, and increase municipal revenue for a cleaner and greener Kabul.

Nawandish also serves as a member of the Kabul Polytechnic University’s Academic Council and of Kabul University. He is a member of two non – governmental organizations: the Afghanistan Engineers and Architects Association and Afghan American Engineers Union. Nawandish is also current president of Society of Afghan Architects and Engineers (SAAE).

Nawandish was reluctant to be the mayor of Kabul at first due to its difficulty. His day begins at five in the morning and usually ends at about one the following morning.

He is a compulsive walker, sometimes covering as much as 10 km (six miles) a day. The mayor is known to be a night bird. He often inspects Kabul's streets at night when residents of the city are fast asleep. Mr Nawandish has succeeded in generating millions of dollars more revenue for Kabul during his tenure - mainly from retail taxes, business taxes, advertisements and property and business taxes. He also has regular visits to Washington, Moscow and Istanbul. One of the mayor's top objectives now is his ongoing campaign to remove illegal shops, buildings and illegally parked carts from the city's streets and pavements.

== Early years ==
Muhammad Yunus Nawandish has thirty years of experience in the oil, gas and power sectors in Afghanistan. He served as Manager of the Afghan Gas Refinery Department, Ministry of Mines and Industry (MMI) from 1979 – 1981; as Adviser in Ministry of foreign affairs from 1984 – 1988; as Petroleum Engineer (MMI) from 1989 – 1992; and as Professor of Engineering at Balkh University in northern Afghanistan from 1992 – 1994. During the Taliban regime (1998 – 2001) the Mayor lived outside Afghanistan.

From 2001 to 2005 he served as Deputy Minister of Water and Energy. Since 2005 he managed new construction and rehabilitation projects in the generation, transmission and distribution of energy in a conflict environment.

He designed the largest power sector project in Afghanistan, the Northern Transmission System which provides power to Afghanistan from Uzbekistan. On behalf of the Afghan Government, he has coordinated over $500 million in power sector projects in cooperation with the Asian Development Bank, USAID, the European Union, The World Bank, and the Governments of India, Iran, Turkmenistan, Tajikistan and South Korea. He has worked as a senior advisor on the U.S. Agency for International Development funded project to rehabilitate the Sheberghan gas fields.

== Personal life and education ==
Muhammad Yunus Nawandish holds a B.S in Petroleum Engineering from Polytechnical University of Kabul and a M.S in Gas Production and Distribution Specialty from Ukraine. He is married and has 6 children.

== Achievements and awards ==
The Mayor of Kabul was invited to the United States Conference of Mayors (USCM) as a special guest in 2011. He is the first public participation gold medalist in Afghanistan that was awarded by the Citizens in Kabul. The Christian Science Monitor hailed Mayor Nawandish as "The can-do mayor of Kabul: Some see a model for a modern Afghanistan politician". He has also been dubbed as the "Builder of Kabul".

In 2012 Muhammad Yunus Nawandish was selected for 16 best mayors of the world by Graduate Institute of International and Development Studies in Geneva, Switzerland, and he has been chosen for top 5 mayors among all 16 mayors of the other countries.

=== Mayoral highlights ===
With hardly any tax revenues, he has found something to say to the city's hundreds of aid agencies: “Build me something that will last 10 years.”
