= Kamaluddin Nezami =

Afghan politician, governor of Panjshir Province during 2020 and 2021

Governor of Panjshir
- In office 2016 – 6 September 2021

Personal details
- Party: Jamyat-E-Islami Shorah Nezar

Kamaluddin Nezami (also, Nizami) is an Afghan politician who was appointed governor of Panjshir Province in 2016. As of 6 September 2021, his status as governor is unclear.

== Culture and education ==
Kamaluddin Nezami is an engineer of Tajik ethnic background, hailing from Bazarak of Panjshir Province. He is an engineer of Tajik ethnic background, originally from Bazarak in Panjshir Province. He was graduated from Kabul Polytechnic Engineering School and, in 1978, joined the resistance movement in Panjshir against the Soviet Union. He later became one of the close associates of the Mujahideen commander Ahmad Shah Massoud, known as the “Lion of Panjshir.”

== Governorship ==
Nezami became governor of Panjshir Province in 2016. In February 2020, during the power struggle between Ashraf Ghani and Abdullah Abdullah, Nezami declared his loyalty to Abdullah Abdullah, Chief Executive of the National Unity Government established in 2014. Nezami stated that he would disobey orders from Ghani.

Actions taken in 2021 during Nezami's governorship included consultation with citizens' and local government representatives on "social obstacles" to the Central Asia-South Asia power project that aims to bring surplus electrical power to Afghanistan and Pakistan from neighbouring countries.

== Panjshir conflict ==
During the 2021 Panjshir conflict that followed the 15 August 2021 Fall of Kabul, Nezami stated in early September that drones had been used to bombard National Resistance Front of Afghanistan forces in Panjshir.
