= Mohammad Daud Sultanzoy =

Mayor of Kabul

Mohammad Daoud Sultanzoy
- محمد داود سلطان‌زوی

Mayor of Kabul
- In office 1 April 2020 – 24 August 2021
- President: Ashraf Ghani; Amrullah Saleh (de jure)
- Emir: Hibatullah Akhundzada (de facto)
- Preceded by: Muhammad Yunus Nawandish
- Succeeded by: Hamdullah Nomani

Member of the 2002 Loyal Jirga
- In office 11 June 2002 – 19 June 2005
- President: Hamid Karzai (acting)

Personal details
- Born: 13 September 1952 (age 74) Kabul, Kabul Province, Kingdom of Afghanistan
- Education: Kabul University
- Profession: Politician, Pilot

Military service
- Battles/wars: Soviet war in Afghanistan

Mohammad Daoud Sultanzoy (Pashto: محمد داود سلطان‌زوی; born 13 September 1952), is an Afghan politician, pilot and television presenter who served as Mayor of Kabul from 2020 to 2021; the Fall of Kabul (2021) occurred during his incumbency. He was previously elected to represent Ghazni Province in Wolesi Jirga, the lower house of its National Legislature, in 2005. He is a Pashtun from the Ghilzai tribe. He is the only politician ever to serve under three heads of state leaders, Ghani and Saleh for Islamic Republic, and Akhundzada for Islamic Emirate (Taliban).

== History ==
Daoud Sultanzoy was born 13 September 1952 in Kabul. He graduated from Kabul University with a Bachelor of Science in engineering management in 1973. He trained as a pilot at the Pan American World Airways Training Center and the McDonnell-Douglas Corporation Training Center. He held an aircraft Airline Transport Pilot diploma (equivalent to MA/MS) and was certified to fly more than eight types of jet aircraft with more than 32000 hours of flying worldwide.

Sultanzoy fought against the Soviet Union and the Democratic Republic of Afghanistan in the early 1980s, during the Soviet–Afghan War. After he was wounded, he returned to the United States, where he became a pilot and in management for United Airlines. He actively participated in Afghan political and civil circles during the 1980s and 1990s.

Daoud Sultanzoy returned to Afghanistan following the US led invasion in 2001, and was elected as a member of the 2002 loya jirga. He was later elected as a member of the Wolesi Jirga for Ghazni province in the 2005 parliamentary election. During his term he served as the Chairman of the Committee for National Economy, Rural Development, Agriculture and NGOs. He also took part in numerous Presidential delegations to countries such as Germany, France, Pakistan, India, Russia, Iran, China, the US and many other European and Asian countries. Gave lectures and seminars in European think tanks in Germany, France, Italy, The European Union, India.

More recently, Sultanzoy hosted a show on Tolo TV, and ran in the 2014 Afghan presidential election.

He was previously the head of the Afghan Airfields Economic Development Commission (AAEDC).

On 1 April 2020, he was appointed as the Mayor of Kabul by President Ashraf Ghani.

On 15 August 2021, after the fall of Kabul, Daoud Sultanzoy released a video in which he said that the Taliban leadership contacted him and asked him to continue working as Mayor of Kabul Municipality and "to provide the necessary services to the people." The Taliban named a replacement mayor on 24 August, Hamdullah Nomani.
