= List of governors of Panjshir =

This is a list of the governors of the province of Panjshir, Afghanistan.

Image	Governor	Term	References
	Hajji Bahlol	2005 – 21 April 2010	
	Keramuddin Keram	21 April 2010 – 2 November 2013	
	Abdul Rahman Kabiri	2 November 2013 – 6 June 2015	
	Muhammad Arif Sarwari	6 June 2015 – 2017	
	Kamaluddin Nezami	2017 – 6 September 2021	
	Qudratullah Panjshiri	8 September 2021 – June 2022	
	Mohammad Nasim Noori	June 2022 – May 2023	
	Mohammad Agha Hakim	May 2023 –	

== See also ==
- List of current governors of Afghanistan
