= Engineer (Afghan honorific) =

Engineer is an honorific used in Afghanistan, which is commonly translated into English, rather than being transliterated, like "Mullah" or "Maulvi".

== Examples of Afghan politicians known by the honorific Engineer ==
- Hamid Karzai's first cabinet included Engineer Abdul Rahim -- the Afghan Communications Minister.
- Hamid Karzai appointed Engineer Mohammad Daoud as the Governor of Helmand Province in December 2005.
- Engineer Mohammad Alim Qarar was selected to the Wolesi Jirga from Lagham Province.
- Engineer Abdul Hakim was one of the signatories to the Bonn Conference that picked Hamid Karzai as President of the Afghan Interim Administration.
- Engineer Muhammad Harif Sarwari entered the Meshrano Jirga in 2005.
- Engineer Muhammad Hashim Ortaq entered the Meshrano Jirga in 2005.
