= Qudratullah Panjshiri =

Governor of Panjshir province

Maulvi Qudratullah Panjshiri
- مولوی قدرت الله پنجشیری

Governor of Panjshir
- In office 8 September 2021 – June 2022
- Prime Minister: Hasan Akhund
- Emir: Hibatullah Akhundzada
- Succeeded by: Mohammad Nasim Noori

Maulvi Qudratullah Panjshiri (Dari: مولوی قدرت الله پنجشیری) has been affiliated with the Taliban militant group in Afghanistan and was Governor of Panjshir province from September 2021 to June 2022. He was arrested in February 2023 by the Taliban regime on suspicion of Islamic State membership.
