= Mohammad Alim Qarar =

- Born: December 1958 (age 67)
- Occupation: Member of the Wolesi Jirga
- Title: Engineer

Engineer Mohammad Alim Qarar is a member of the Wolesi Jirga for Laghman Province, Afghanistan. He is an ethnic Pashai. He was a former commander with the Hezb-e-Islami Gulbuddin militia.
