= Muhammad Arif Sarwari =

Afghan politician

Governor of Panjshir
- In office 6 June 2015 – 2017
- Preceded by: Abdul Rahman Kabiri

Personal details
- Born: 1961 (age 63–64) Deh Mazang, Kabul Province, Afghanistan
- Occupation: legislator
- Nickname: Muhammad Harif Sarwari

Engineer Muhammad Arif Sarwari, also known simply as Engineer Arif, is a former Afghan intelligence official and politician.

== Pre-Taliban ==
Sarwari studied electronics at a technical college, later transferring to Kabul Polytechnic. He did not complete his studies, instead joining the anti-Soviet resistance in 1982 during the Soviet–Afghan War. In 1992, after the ouster of the communists, he was appointed the chief of security of Kabul. He later served as the first deputy of National Directorate of Security. When the Taliban seized Kabul he joined the forces of Ahmad Shah Masoud, who was later to lead the Afghan Northern Alliance.

== Northern Alliance and post-war ==
During the first Taliban rule, Sarwari was the chief intelligence official of the Northern Alliance under Ahmad Shah Massoud. Massoud's September 9, 2001 assassination took place in Aref's office.

After the September 11 attacks, he was a major figure in coordinating with the CIA's Jawbreaker team, which worked with the Northern Alliance and prepared the way for further military operations. After the fall of Kabul, Sarwari and his organization took over the existing Afghan National Directorate of Security, but he was removed by Afghan President Hamid Karzai in early 2004 and replaced by Amrullah Saleh.

=== Governor of Panjshir ===
Sarwari was Governor of Panjshir Province as of March 2017.

=== Evacuation ===
After the Taliban captured Kabul in 2022, he was evacuated out of Afghanistan and into Kosovo.

== Personal life ==
Sarwari is married and has two sons and three daughters. He speaks Dari, Pashto, Russian and English.
