= Muhammad Hashim Ortaq =

Afghan politician (born 1955)

Engineer Muhammad Hashim Ortaq, born 1955 (age 70–71), entered the Meshrano Jirga, the upper house of Afghanistan's National Assembly in 2005. He represents Faryab Province. He is a member of Junbish-e-Milli.

He has an engineering degree from Kabul University.

During the Soviet occupation of Afghanistan he was a senior security official in the Najibullah administration.
