= Economy of Afghanistan =

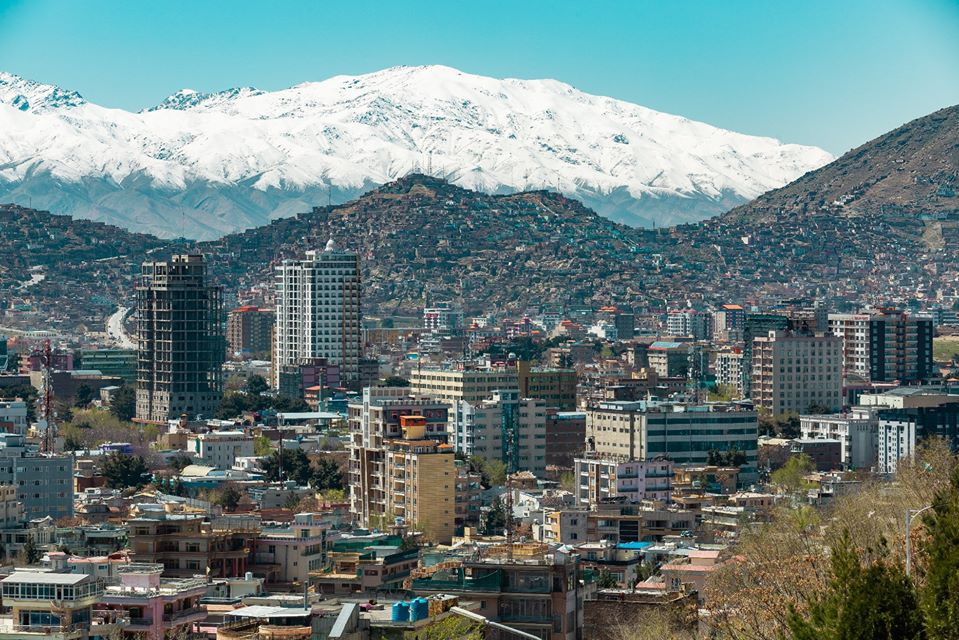
- Kabul, the economic capital of Afghanistan
- Currency: Afghani (AFN, ؋)
- Fiscal year: 21 March– 20 March
- Trade organizations: ECO, SAARC, SCO (observer) and WTO
- Country group: Developing/Emerging; Low-income economy; Least developed country

Statistics
- Population: ▲43,844,111 (2025)
- GDP: ▲$19.66 billion (nominal; 2026f); ▲$101 billion (PPP; 2026f)
- GDP rank: 136th (nominal; 2026); 104th (PPP; 2026)
- GDP growth: 3% (2025f)
- GDP per capita: ▲$448 (nominal; 2026f); ▲$2,300 (PPP; 2026f)
- GDP per capita rank: 193rd (nominal; 2026); 179th (PPP; 2026)
- GDP per capita growth: 0.1% (2023)
- GDP by sector: agriculture: 34.7%; industry: 13.4%; services: 46.4%; (2023); note: data exclude opium production
- Inflation (CPI): ▲5% (2026)
- Population below national poverty line: 48% (2024, OCHA); NA% on less than $1.90/day
- Human Development Index: ▲0.496 low (2023)
- Labor force: ▲14,450,224 (2019); 47% employment to population ratio (2021)
- Labor force by occupation: agriculture: 44.3%; industry: 18.1%; services: 37.6%; (2017)
- Unemployment: ▲13.3% (2024)
- Informal employment: 78.9% (2021)
- Main industries: small-scale production of textiles, soap, furniture, shoes, fertilizer, apparel, food-products, non-alcoholic beverages, mineral water, cement; handwoven carpets; natural gas, coal, copper

External
- Exports: ▲$2 billion (2022); note: not including illicit exports or reexports
- Export goods: fruits, nuts, rugs, wool, cotton, hides, gemstone, and medical herbs
- Main export partners: Pakistan 42%; India 40%; China 4%; United Arab Emirates 2%; Turkey 2% (2023)
- Imports: ▲$7 billion (2022)
- Import goods: machinery and other capital goods, food, textiles and petroleum products
- Main import partners: United Arab Emirates 28%; Pakistan 15%; China 15%; Uzbekistan 12%; Kazakhstan 9% (2023)
- Current account: ▼ -$3.137 billion (2020)
- Gross external debt: $1.4 billion (2022)

Public finance
- Government debt: ▼8.3% of GDP (2023)
- Foreign reserves: $9.6 billion (Frozen by the U.S.)(2021)
- Budget balance: −15.1% (of GDP) (2017)
- Revenue: 2.276 billion (2017)
- Spending: 5.328 billion (2017)
- All values, unless otherwise stated, are in US dollars.

Afghanistan has a developing economy that is considered low income and among the world's least developed. With a population of around 43 million people, the nation generates $19.66 billion in nominal gross domestic product (GDP) and $101 billion by purchasing power parity (PPP) GDP, as of 2026. The official currency of Afghanistan is the afghani (AFN). Its central bank – known as Da Afghanistan Bank – oversees monetary policy. A burgeoning banking system operates within the country, including the Afghanistan International Bank, Azizi Bank, New Kabul Bank, and Pashtany Bank. The nation exports around $2 billion, with agricultural, mineral and textile products accounting for 94% of total exports. It's external debt has been around $1.4 billion since the early 2020s.

The Afghan economy continues to improve with strengthening trade routes, infrastructure development and the expansion of the strategically important sectors of agriculture, transport, energy and mining. Economic development and political stability is supported by a large and remittance-rich Afghan diaspora. The country holds mineral deposits worth over $2.5 trillion, with vast amounts of copper, rare earths and minerals. Around 48% of its population lives below the poverty line. The population of Afghanistan increased by more than 50% between 2001 and 2014, while its GDP grew eightfold. After the U.S. withdrawal from Afghanistan in 2021, the U.S. government confiscated $9.5 billion worth of Afghanistan's assets to stop the Taliban from accessing it.

== Economic history ==
When Afghanistan was ruled by Emir Abdur Rahman Khan (1880–1901) and his son Habibullah Khan (1901–1919), a great deal of commerce was controlled by the government. These monarchs were eager to develop the stature of government and the country's military capability, and so attempted to raise money by the imposition of state monopolies on the sale of commodities and high taxes. This slowed the long-term development of Afghanistan during that period. Western technologies and manufacturing methods were introduced at the command of the Afghan ruler, but in general only according to the logistical requirements of the growing army. An emphasis was placed on the manufacture of weapons and other military material. This process was in the hands of a small number of foreign experts invited to Kabul by the Afghans. Otherwise, it was not possible for non-Afghans, particularly westerners, to set up large-scale enterprises in Afghanistan during that period.

In the post-independence period, Da Afghanistan Bank strongly financed the cultivation of cotton; at one point, the Spinzar Cotton Company in Kunduz Province was one of the largest providers of cotton in the world, most of which were exported to the Soviet Union. Fruits were mainly exported to British-controlled India (now Pakistan and India).

The first prominent plan to develop Afghanistan's economy in modern times was the Helmand Valley Authority project of 1952, modeled on the Tennessee Valley Authority in the United States, which was expected to be of primary economic importance. Glenn Foster, an American contractor working in Afghanistan in the 1950s, stated this about the Afghan people:

Even though there are masses of people, the country seems able to feed them all. Although their diet may not be abundant, you don't see the hunger that you do in some countries....

The same can be said today. Afghanistan began facing severe economic hardships after the 1979 Soviet invasion, which caused the permanent closure of all its border checkpoints with neighboring Iran and Pakistan. The civil war of the 1990s destroyed much of the country's limited infrastructure, and disrupted normal patterns of economic activity. Eventually, Afghanistan went from a traditional economy to a centrally planned economy up until 2002 when it was replaced by a free market economy following the 2001 war in Afghanistan. Gross domestic product has fallen substantially since the 1980s due to disruption of trade and transport as well as loss of labor and capital. Continuing internal strife severely hampered domestic efforts to rebuild the nation or provide ways for the international community to help.

According to the International Monetary Fund, the Afghan economy grew 20% in the fiscal year ending in March 2004, after expanding 30% in the previous 12 months. The growth was mainly attributed to United Nations assistance. Billions of dollars in international aid and remittances from expats had entered Afghanistan from 2002 to 2021. A GDP of $4 billion in fiscal year 2003 was recalculated by the IMF to $6.1 billion, after adding proceeds from opium production. Mean graduate pay was $0.56 per man-hour in 2010. The country is still striving to be self-sufficient in wheat, rice, poultry and dairy production.

The recent reestablishment of the Islamic Emirate led to temporary suspension of international development aid to Afghanistan. The World Bank and International Monetary Fund also halted payments during that period. In this regard, Hibatullah Akhundzada stated that "the economy of a country is built when its people work together and do not rely on foreign aid" The Biden administration froze about $9 billion in assets belonging to the Da Afghanistan Bank, which was intended to block the Islamic Emirate from accessing the money. The recent droughts, earthquakes and floods in the country have created further adverse economic situation for many residents. The Ministry of Finance has collected over $2 billion in 2022.

The GDP of Afghanistan is estimated to have dropped by 20% following the Islamic Emirate's return to power. Following this, after months of free-fall, the Afghan economy began stabilizing, as a result of restrictions on smuggled imports, limits on banking transactions, and UN aid. In 2023, the Afghan economy began seeing signs of revival. This has also been followed by stable exchange rates, low inflation, stable revenue collection, and the rise of trade in exports. In the third quarter of 2023, the Afghani rose to be the best performing currency in the world, climbing over 9% against the US dollar.

== Economic development, recovery and downturn ==
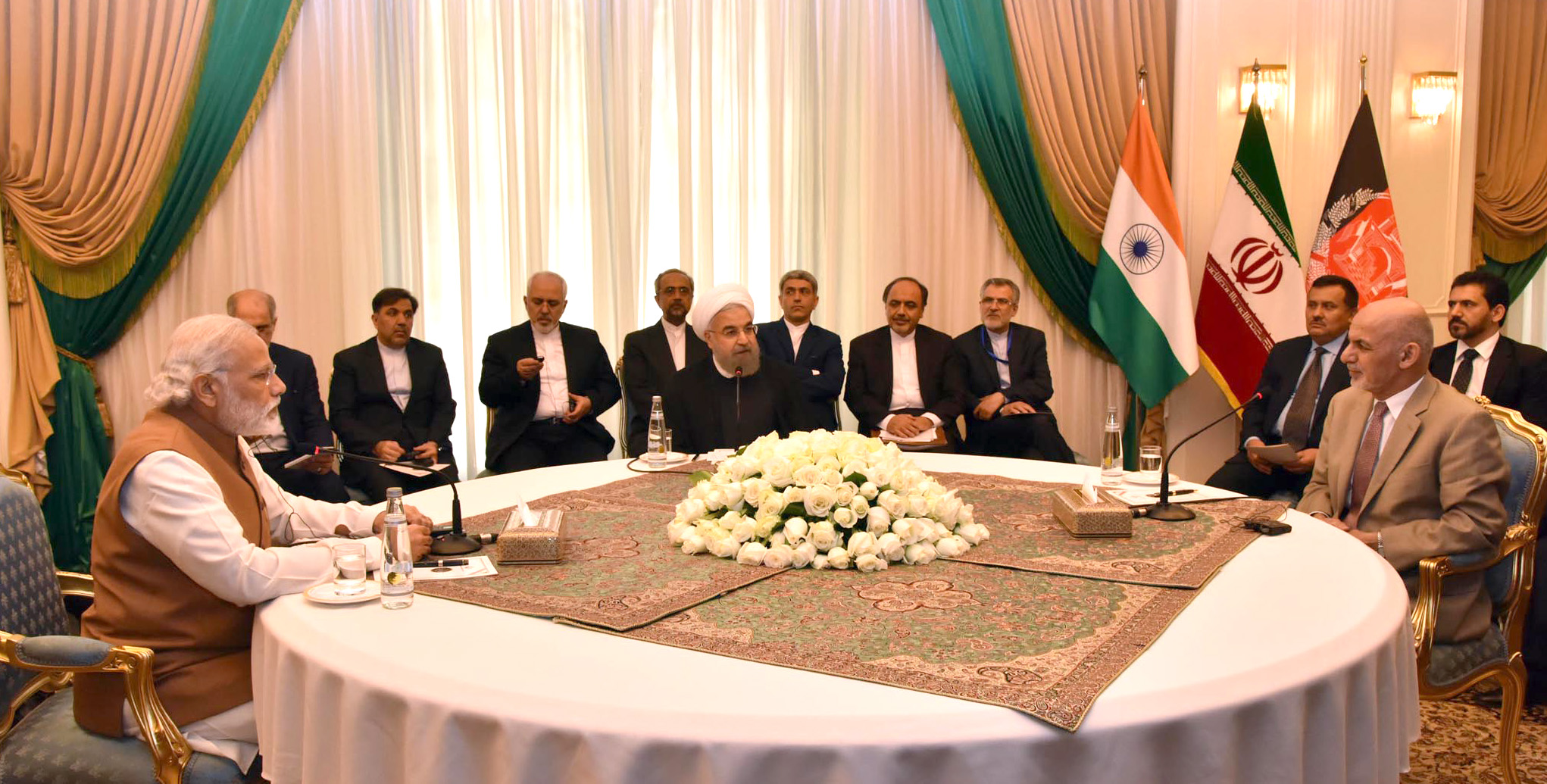
From left to right: Indian Prime Minister Narendra Modi, Iranian President Hassan Rouhani, and Afghan President Ashraf Ghani, during the signing of the Chabahar Port transit agreement in May 2016

Afghanistan embarked on a modest economic development program in the 1930s. The government founded banks; introduced paper money; established a university; expanded primary, secondary, and technical schools; and sent students abroad for education. In 1952 it created the Helmand Valley Authority to manage the economic development of the Helmand and Arghandab valleys through irrigation and land development, a scheme which remains one of the country's most important capital resources.

In 1956, the government promulgated the first in a long series of ambitious development plans. By the late 1970s, these had achieved only mixed results due to flaws in the planning process as well as inadequate funding and a shortage of the skilled managers and technicians needed for implementation. Afghanistan became a member of ECO, OIC, SAARC, and WTO. It has an observer status in the SCO.

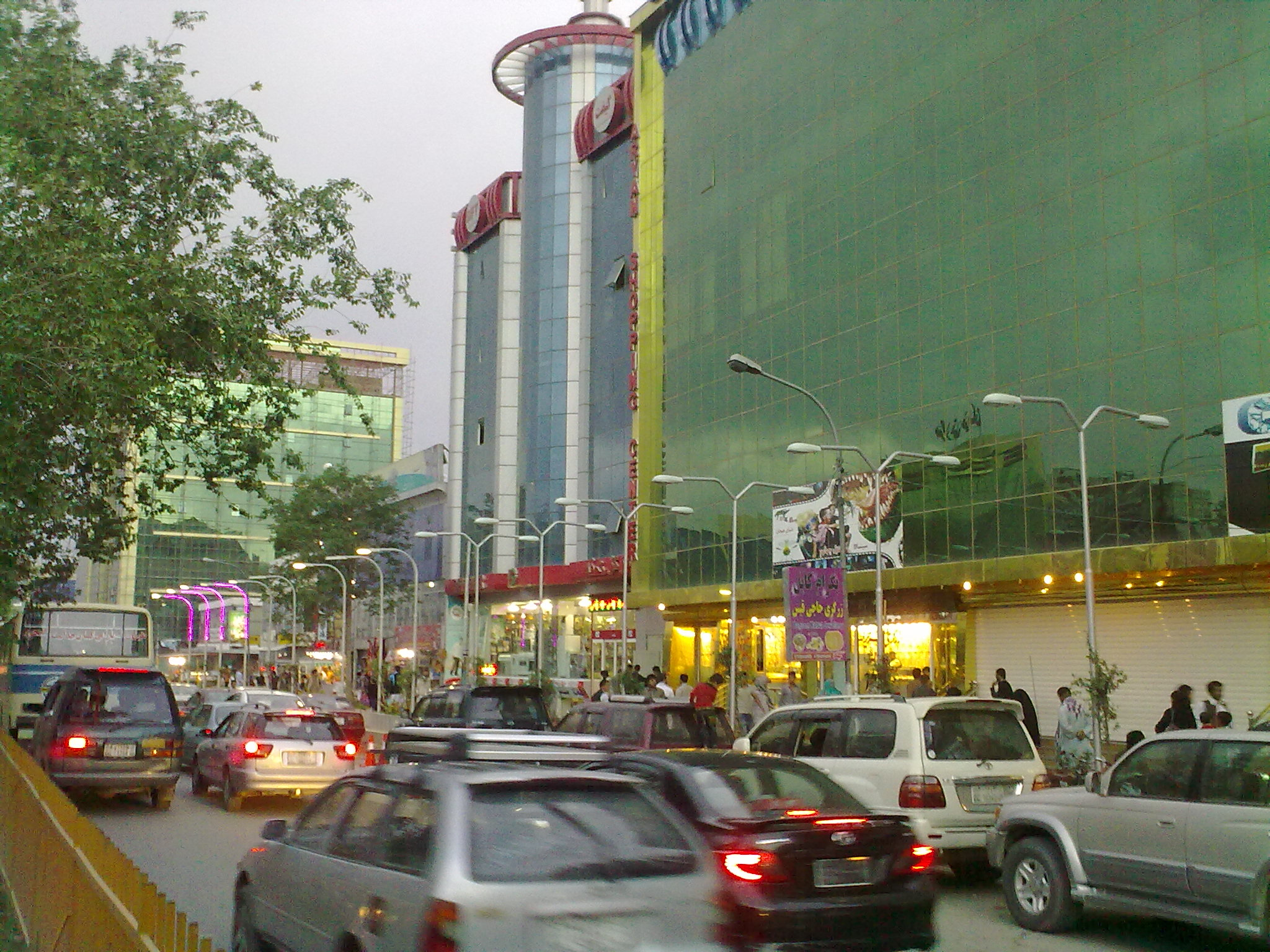
A shopping area in the Khair Khana neighborhood of Kabul

Some of the ongoing national mega projects include the Qosh Tepa Canal, the TAPI gas pipeline, the CASA-1000 electricity line, the Afghanistan Ring Road modernization, and the New Kabul housing project. Other smaller housing projects include the Qatar Township in Kabul, Aino Mena in Kandahar and the Ghazi Amanullah Khan Town east of Jalalabad. Hundreds of similar projects are also found in Herat in the west, Mazar-e-Sharif in the north, Khost in the east, and in other cities.

After the Islamic Emirate returned to power, the country suffered from a major liquidity crisis and lack of banknotes. Because outside donors have severely cut funding to support Afghanistan's health, education, and other essential sectors, many Afghans lost their incomes. Under the assessment system of the World Food Programme (WFP), almost 20 million people suffered either level-3 “crisis” or level-4 “emergency” levels of food insecurity. The impact of the crisis on women and girls was especially severe. Officials under the Islamic Emirate continue to provide communication services to areas that lacked them. They collected 61 billion afghanis in tariffs in 2022, which increased to 76 billion in 2023. And they continue to attract foreign investors.

== Agriculture, animal husbandry and forestry ==
Agriculture remains Afghanistan's most important source of employment: 60-80 percent of Afghanistan's population works in this sector, although it accounts for less than a third of GDP due to insufficient irrigation, drought, lack of market access, and other structural impediments. Most Afghan farmers are primarily subsistence farmers.

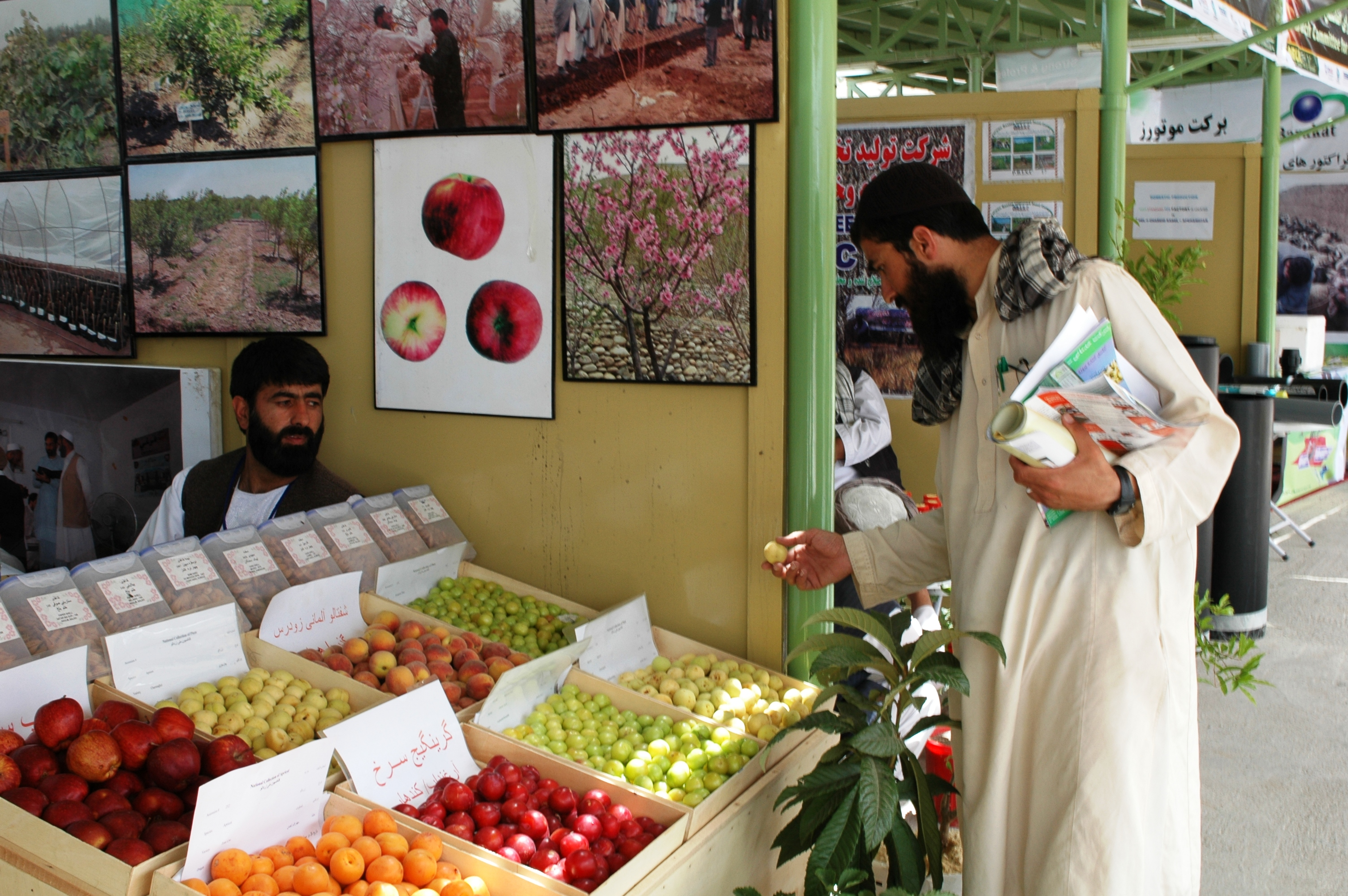
An agricultural show in Kabul

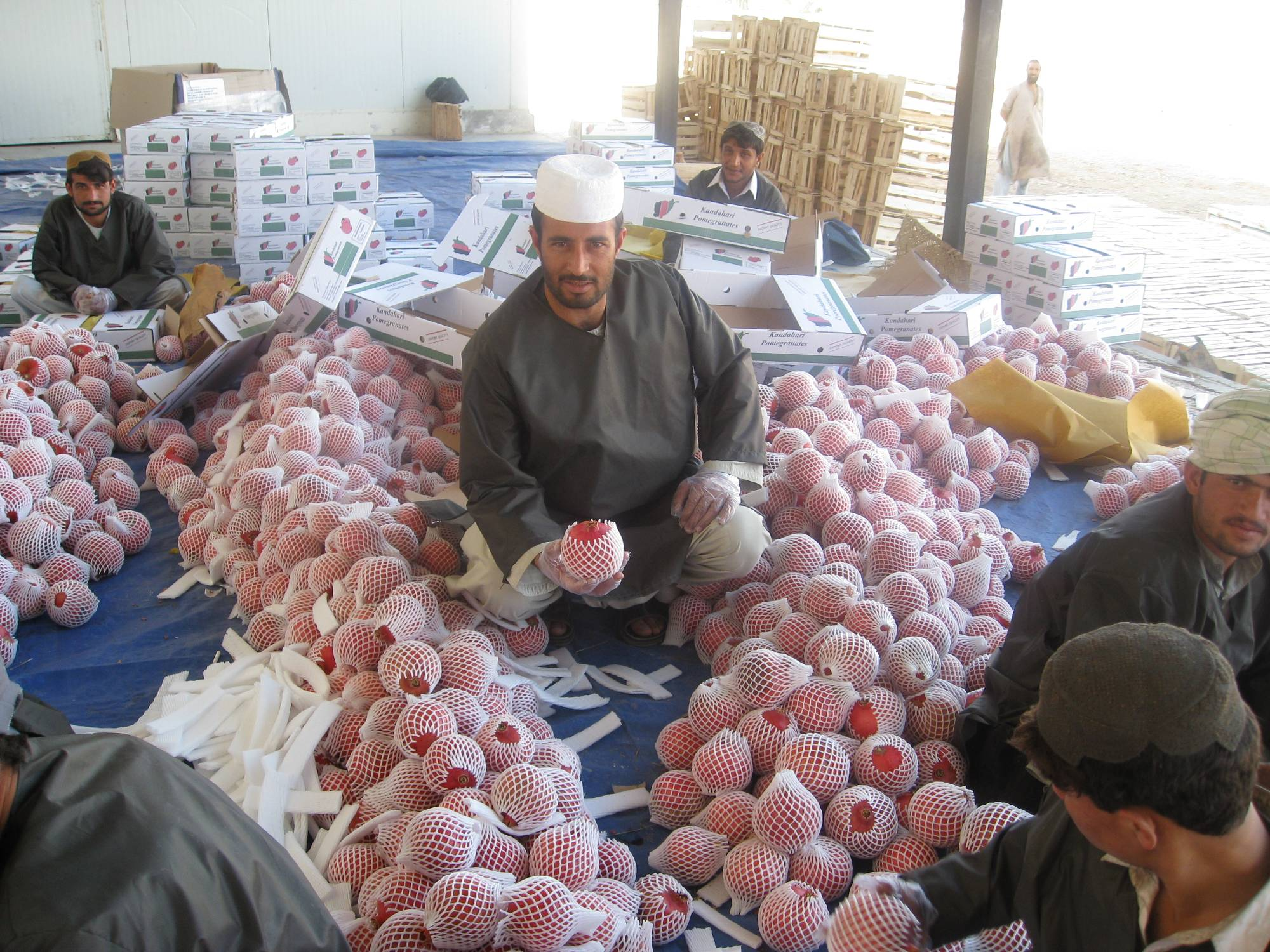
Workers processing pomegranates (anaar), which Afghanistan is famous for in Asia

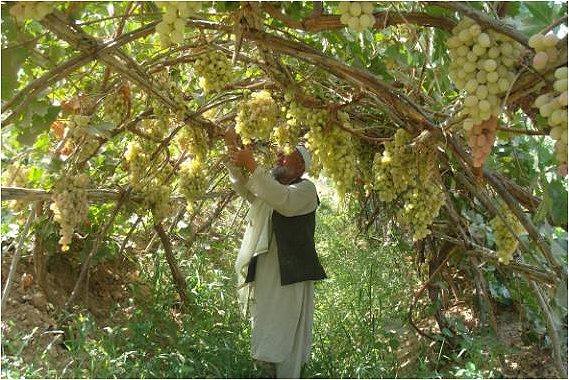
Afghan grapes

Afghanistan produced in 2018:

- 3.6 million tons of wheat;
- 984 thousand tons of grape (18th largest world producer);
- 615 thousand tons of potato;
- 591 thousand tons of vegetable;
- 381 thousand tons of watermelon;
- 352 thousand tons of rice;
- 329 thousand tons of melon;
- 217 thousand tons of apple;
- 150 thousand tons of onion;
- 106 thousand tons of maize;
- 56 thousand tons of barley;
- 47 thousand tons of peach;

In addition to smaller productions of other agricultural products.

Afghanistan produces around 1.5 million tons of fresh fruits annually, which could be increased significantly. It produces some of the finest fruits, especially pomegranates, grapes, melons, apples, cherries and mulberries. Other fruits grown in the country include apricots, figs, kiwi, oranges, peaches, pears, persimmons, plums, and strawberries. Organic farming has always been widely practiced in Afghanistan than modern farming. Many of its citizens have recently turned to using greenhouses. There were about 5,000 greenhouses reported in 2017.

Afghanistan's dried fruit exports rose to $667 million in 2025. The country's northern and western provinces are known for pistachio cultivation. In recent years, farmers in the southern provinces began growing American pistachio trees. The provinces of Paktika, Paktia, Khost, Nangarhar, Nuristan and Kunduz are famous for pine nuts. The dried fruits basically grow in all provinces of Afghanistan, and they are not only sold locally but also exported to other countries.

The northern and central provinces are more famous for almond and walnut production. The Bamyan Province is the leader of superior potatoes, which produced 370,000 tons in 2020. Nangarhar, Laghman and Kunar are the only provinces in the country where major farming of grapefruits, lemons, limes, and oranges can be found. Nangarhar also has farms of dates, peanuts, olives, and sugarcane. Cultivation of these products have gradually spread to more provinces. Other agricultural products such as avocados, bananas, guavas, mangos and pineapples have recently been planted in the provinces of Balkh, Helmand, Laghman, Nangarhar, and Paktia.

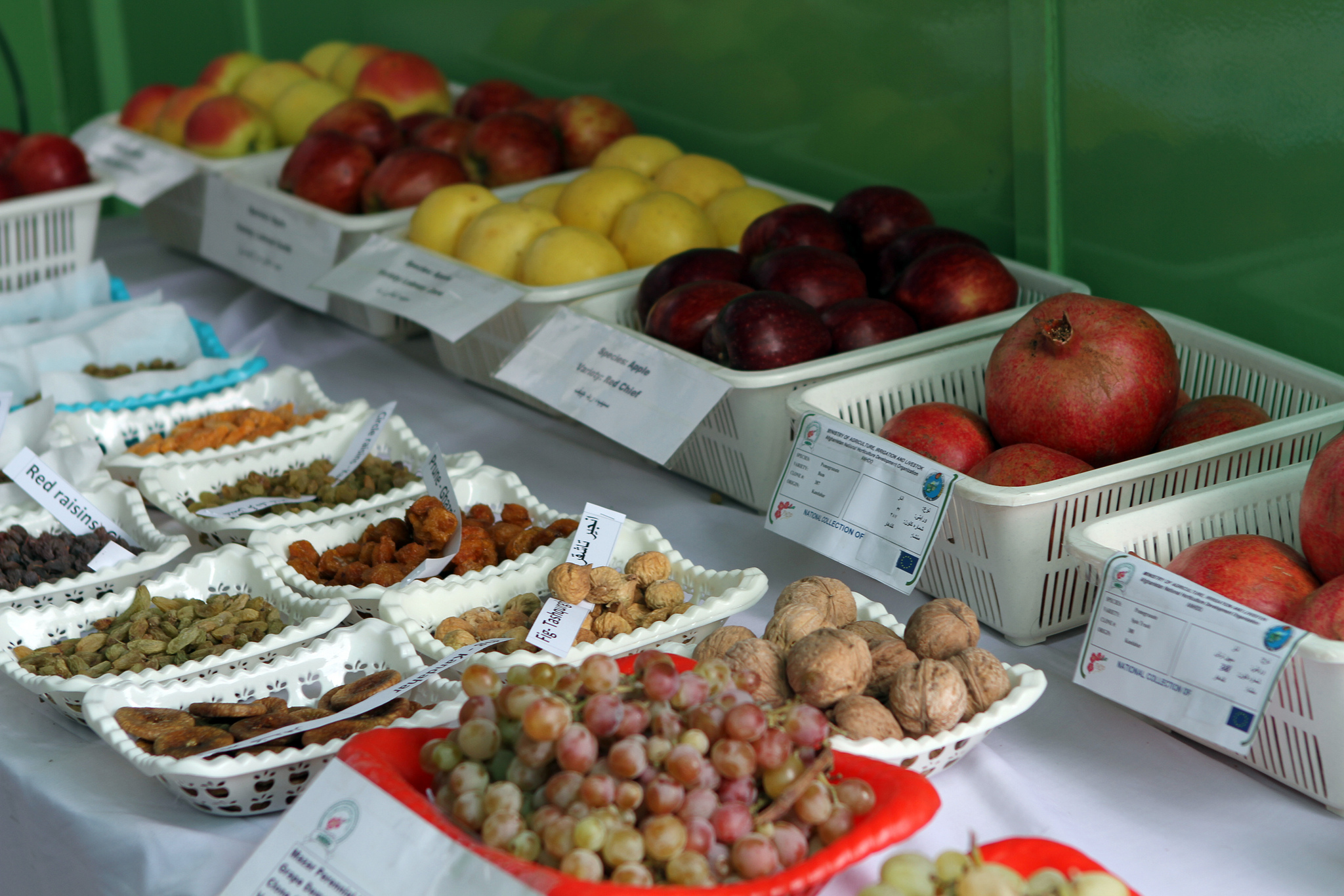
Samples of Afghan fresh and dried fruits

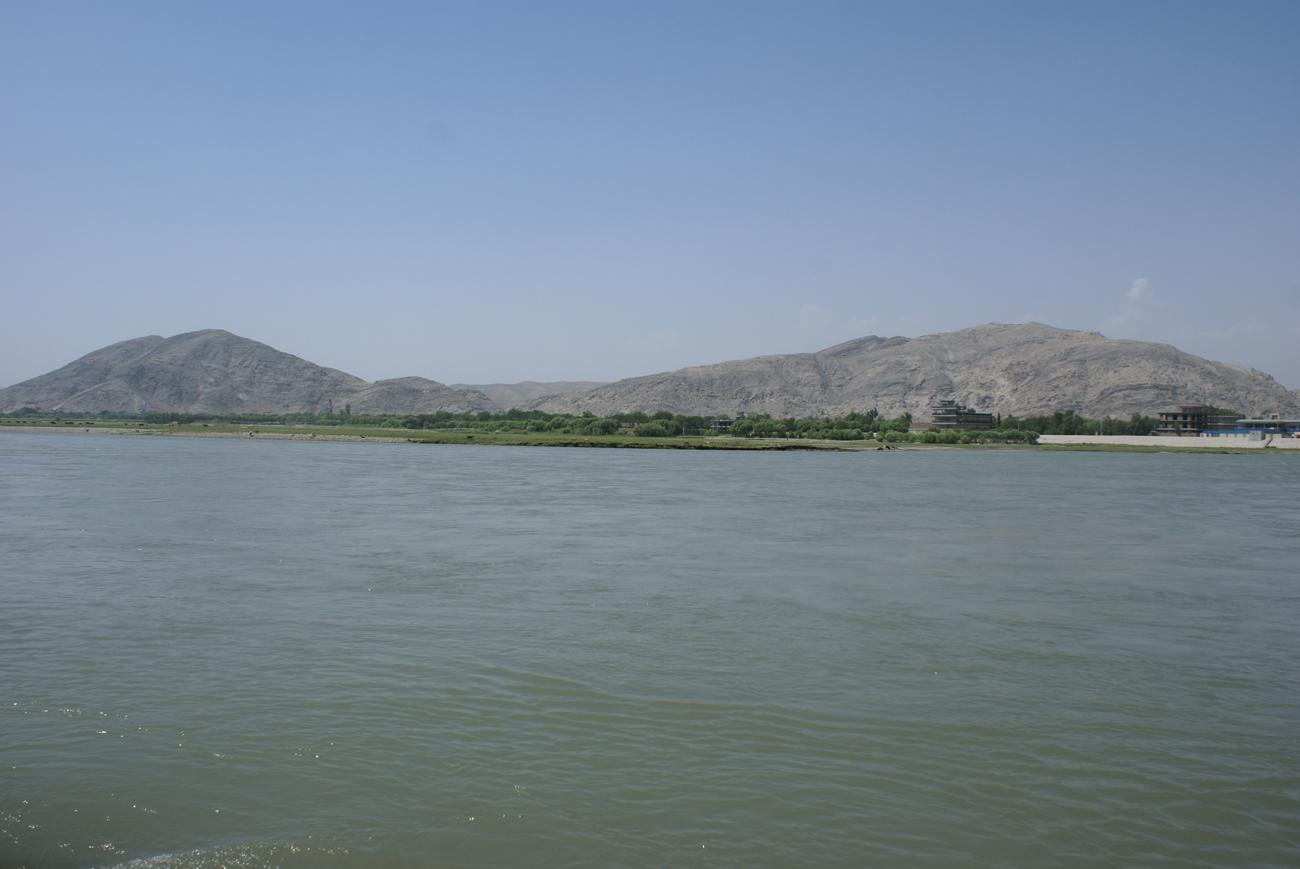
Kabul River near Jalalabad in Nangarhar Province

Afghanistan is listed as the 54th largest vegetables producing country. Most of its vegetables are for domestic consumption and include beans, broccoli, cabbages, carrots, cauliflowers, chickpeas, coriander, corns, cucumbers, eggplants, leeks, lettuces, okras, onions, peppers, potatoes, pumpkins, radishes, rhubarb, spinach, tomatoes, turnips, and zucchinis. Wheat and cereal production is Afghanistan's traditional agricultural mainstay. The nation is nearing self-sufficiency in grain production. It requires an additional 2.33 million tons of wheat to become self-sufficient, which is predicted to be accomplished in the near future.

Arable land in Afghanistan was reported to be over 7.5 million hectares. Wheat production had stood at 4.83 million metric tons in 2024, nurseries held 119,000 hectares of land, and grape production is at 615,000 tons. Cotton production has jumped to 500,000 tons. Around 12,000 ha (30,000 acres) of farm land in Afghanistan is used to cultivate saffron, mostly in the west, north and south of the country. Sugarcane is currently grown on 1,750 ha (4,300 acres) of land, and asafoetida on nearly 980 ha (2,400 acres) of land.

=== Animal husbandry ===
Animal husbandry continues to play an important role in the nation's economy. Afghanistan's livestock population mainly includes cattle, sheep, goats, camels, horses and donkeys. The country has around 15,000 poultry farms. They are mostly in the warmer parts of the country.

=== Forestry ===
These days up to 2.8% of Afghanistan is forested, which amounts to nearly 2,000,000 ha (4,900,000 acres) of the land. In 2010, it was about 2.1% (or 1,350,000 ha (3,300,000 acres)). It can be increased significanly by planting more trees, including in the non-rocky mountains that trap underground water. Some small steps have been taken in recent years in planting trees all across Afghanistan. Felling has been made illegal nationally.

=== Fishing ===
Afghanistan is landlocked with its citizens having no direct access to an ocean. The country has many lakes, ponds, reservoirs, rivers, springs, streams, etc., which make it a suitable climate for fish farming. Historically, fish constituted a smaller part of the Afghan diet because of the unavailability of modern fish farms. Fishing only took place in the lakes and rivers, particularly in the Amu, Helmand and Kabul rivers. Consumption of fish has increased sharply due to the establishment of thousands of fish farms. Over 7,000 new ones are being established in the coming years. The largest ones are at the national reservoirs, which supply fish eggs to smaller fish farms.

== Trade and industry ==
Exports of Afghanistan by product category (2019) Chemical products Transportation Machines Mineral products Plastics and rubbers Metals Foodstuffs Precious metals Textiles Instruments Animal products Vegetable products Paper goods Footwear and headwear Miscellaneous Stone and glass Wood products Animal and vegetable bi-products Animal hides Arts and antiques Weapons

Afghanistan's geographical location makes it economically secured. The Lapis Lazuli corridor connects Afghanistan with Turkmenistan and ultimately ends somewhere in Europe. Other such trade routes connect Afghanistan with neighboring Iran, Pakistan, Tajikistan and Uzbekistan. The country also has direct trade with China and India via air corridor. In addition, imported goods also enter by rail from neighboring Central Asia, Iran and China.

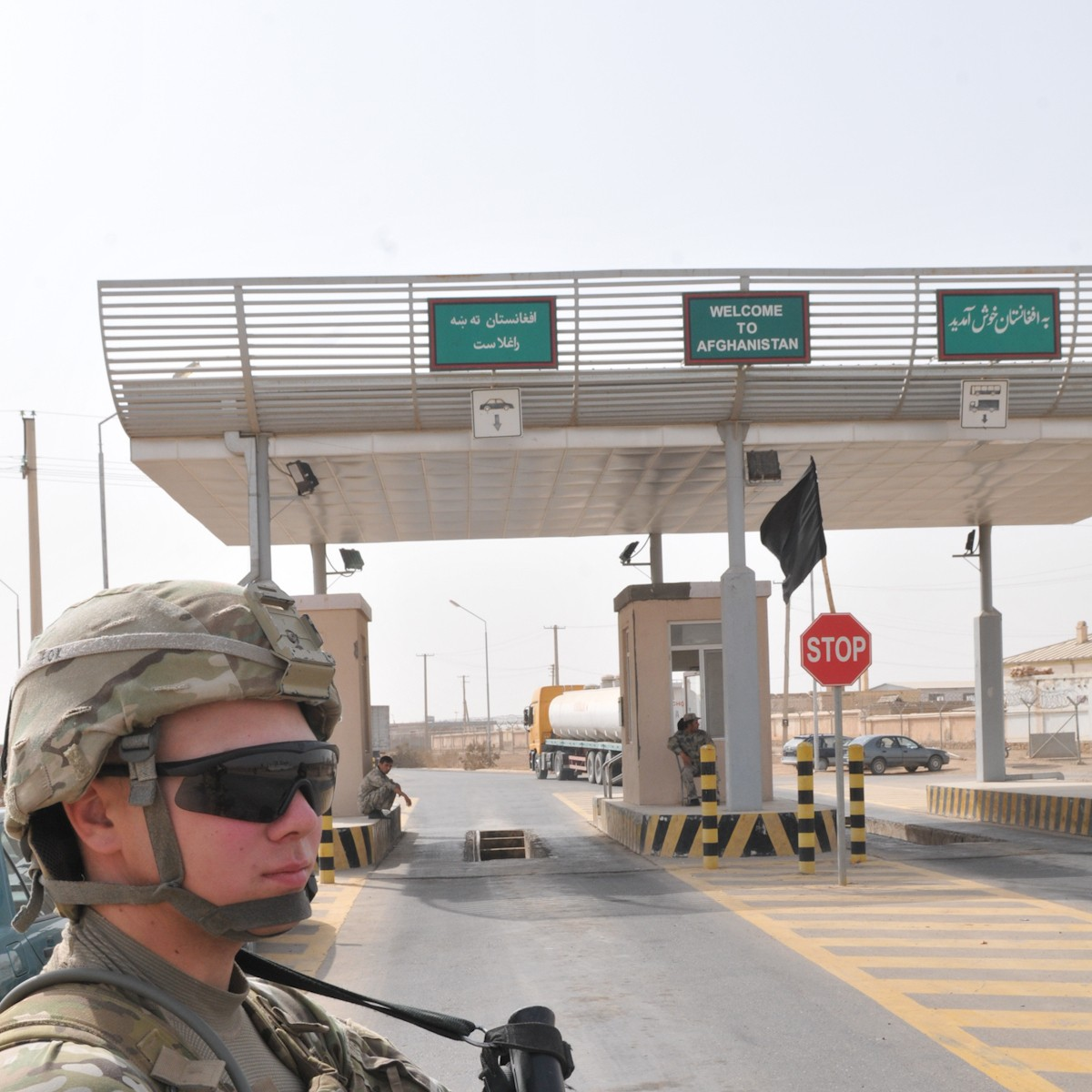
The Port of entry at Sher Khan Bandar in Kunduz Province, near the Afghanistan–Tajikistan border (2011)

The Afghanistan–Pakistan Transit Trade Agreement (APTTA) allows Afghan and Pakistani cargo trucks to transit goods within both nations. This revised US-sponsored APTTA agreement also allows Afghan trucks to transport exports to India via Pakistan up to the Wagah crossing point.

There are multiple dry ports and over a dozen official border crossing point all around Afghanistan. They include Abu Nasir Port in Farah Province, Ai-Khanoum in Takhar Province, Angur Ada in Paktika Province, Aqina in Faryab Province, Dand-aw-Patan in Paktia Province, Ghulam Khan in Khost Province, Hairatan in Balkh Province, Ishkashim in Badakhshan Province, Islam Qala in Herat Province, Sher Khan Bandar in Kunduz Province, Torghundi in Herat Province, Torkham in Nangarhar Province, Spin Boldak in Kandahar Province, and Zaranj in Nimruz Province.

The country also has legal access to two major seaports in Pakistan, the Gwadar Port in Balochistan and the Port Qasim in Sindh. Afghanistan also has legal access to major seaports in Iran, which include the one in Bandar Abbas in the Persian Gulf and the Chabahar Port in the Gulf of Oman.

Afghanistan is endowed with a wealth of natural resources, which include extensive deposits of barites, chromite, coal, copper, gold, gemstone, iron ore, lead, lithium, marble, natural gas, petroleum, salt, sulfur, talc, uranium, and zinc. Rare-earth elements can be found all over the country. It is estimated that Afghanistan has as much as 1,000×10^{6} m^{3} (36×10^{9} cu ft) of natural gas, 570×10^{6} m^{3} (3.6 Gbbl) of oil and condensate reserves. Geologists also found indications of abundant deposits of colored stones and gemstones, including emerald, garnet, kunzite, lapis lazuli, peridot, ruby, sapphire, spinel, and tourmaline.

Afghanistan has at least $1 trillion in untapped mineral deposits. A memo from the Pentagon stated that Afghanistan could become the "Saudi Arabia of lithium". Some believe that the untapped minerals may be worth up to $3 trillion. The Khanashin carbonatites in the Helmand Province of the country have an estimated 1 million metric tonnes of rare earth elements.

Afghanistan currently has a copper mining deal with China Metallurgical Group Corporation, which involves the investment of $2.8 billion by China and an annual income of about $400 million to the Afghan government. The country's Ainak copper mine, located in Logar Province, is one of the biggest in the world. It is estimated to hold at least 11 million tonnes or US$33 billion worth of copper.

The previous Islamic Republic has signed a 30-year contract with investment group Centar and its operating company, Afghan Gold and Minerals Co., to explore and develop a copper mining operation in Balkhab District in Sar-e Pol Province, including a gold mining operation in Badakhshan Province. The copper contract involved a $56 million investment and the gold contract a $22 million investment.

The country's other treasure is the Hajigak iron mine, located 210 km (130 mi) west of Kabul and is believed to hold an estimated 1.8 billion to 2 billion metric tons of the mineral used to make steel. The country also has a number of coal mines.

Afghanistan's important resource in the past has been natural gas, which was first tapped in 1967. During the 1980s, gas sales accounted for $300 million a year in export revenues (56% of the total). About 90% of these exports went to the Soviet Union to pay for imports and debts. However, during the withdrawal of Soviet troops in 1989, the natural gas fields were capped to prevent sabotage by criminals. Gas production has dropped from a high of 8.2×10^{6} m^{3} (290×10^{6} cu ft) per day in the 1980s to a low of about 600,000 m^{3} (21×10^{6} cu ft) in 2001. Production of natural gas was restored during the Karzai administration in 2010.

It is predicted that by pumping-out its own oil reserves, Afghanistan will no longer need to import oil products. Originally, the Karzai administration and China National Petroleum Corporation (CNPC) signed a contract for the development of three oil fields in the northern provinces of Sar-e Pol, Jowzjan and Faryab. It was later reported that CNPC began extracting 240,000 m^{3} (1.5×10^{6} bbl) of oil annually. In early 2023, the Xinjiang Central Asia Petroleum and Gas Company signed a similar contract with the Islamic Emirate of Afghanistan.

There are more than 5,000 factories operating in Afghanistan. Most are locally owned, while others involve foreign investors. They produce construction materials, furniture, household items, apparel, food, beverages, pharmaceutical products, etc. The country imports roughly $500 million of textile goods from other countries. It exported about $168 million worth of cotton in 2022. Afghan handwoven rugs are some of the most popular products for exportation. Other products include hand crafted antique replicas as well as leather and furs. Afghanistan is the third largest exporter of cashmere.

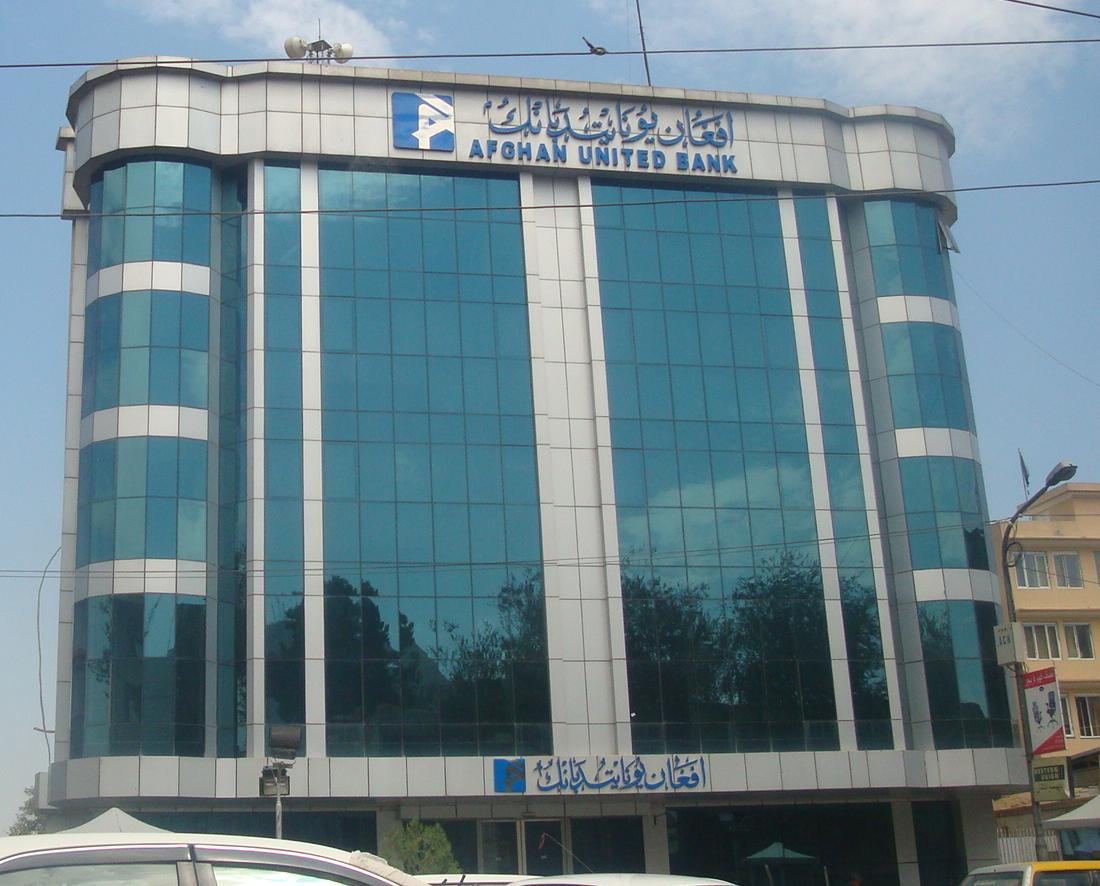
Afghan United Bank

Da Afghanistan Bank serves as the central bank of the nation. The "afghani" (AFN) is the national currency, which has an exchange rate of around 65 afghanis to 1 US dollar. There are about a dozen different banks operating in the country, including Afghanistan International Bank, Kabul Bank, Azizi Bank, Pashtany Bank, Standard Chartered Bank, and First Micro Finance Bank. Cash is still widely used for most transactions. A new law on private investment provides three to seven-year tax holidays to eligible companies and a four-year exemption from exports tariffs and duties. Improvements to the business-enabling environment have resulted in more than $1.5 billion in telecom investment and created more than 100,000 jobs since 2003.

== Energy and water supply ==
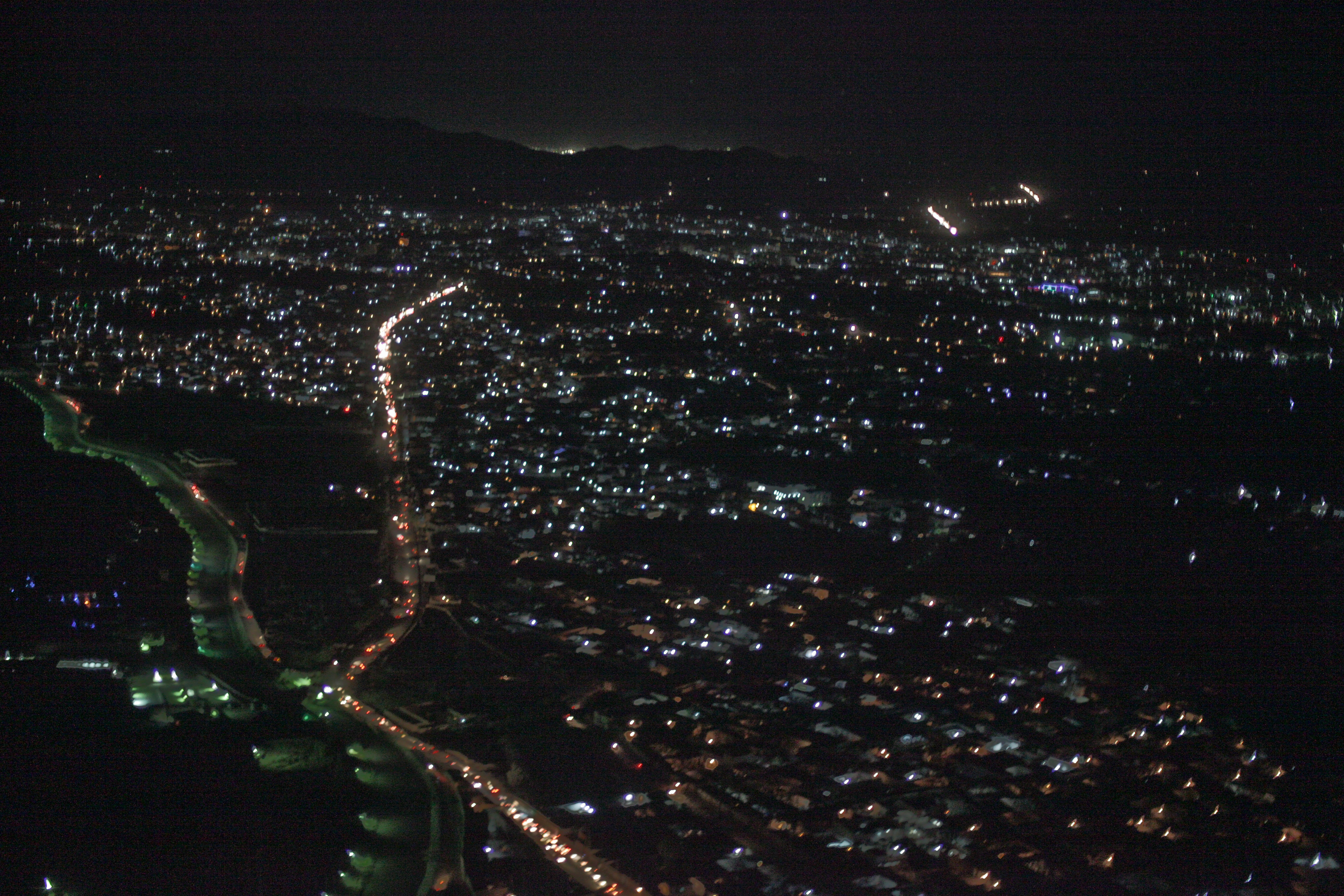
Aerial photography of Kandahar at night in 2011. Its electricity is provided mainly by two sources, the Kajaki power station in neighboring Helmand Province and solar farms on the outskirts of the city.

Energy in Afghanistan is provided by hydropower followed by fossil fuel and solar power. The nation currently generates over 600 megawatts (MW) of electricity from its several hydroelectric plants as well as using fossil fuel and solar panels. Over 720 MW is imported from neighboring Iran, Tajikistan, Turkmenistan and Uzbekistan. Coal, petrolium and natural gas are also used to produce electricity, and the CASA-1000 is expected to add another 300 MW of electricity to the national grid. Due to the large influx of Afghan expats from Iran, Pakistan and other countries, Afghanistan may require as much as 10,000 MW of electricity in the future.

Da Afghanistan Breshna Sherkat (DABS) is the national electricity provider. It charges customers 2.5 afghanis per kw in Kabul Province, 4 afghanis in Herat Province, and around 6 afghanis in Balkh Province. In certain remote areas private companies may provide electricity to villagers by charging them different prices.

Renewable energy alternatives, such as wind and solar energy, has been identified as a high value power source for the future. Afghanistan has the potential to produce over 222,000 MW of electricity by using solar panels. The country also has the potential to produce over 66,000 MW of electricity by using wind turbines. A number of major solar and wind farms exist in the country, with more under development.

== Transport ==
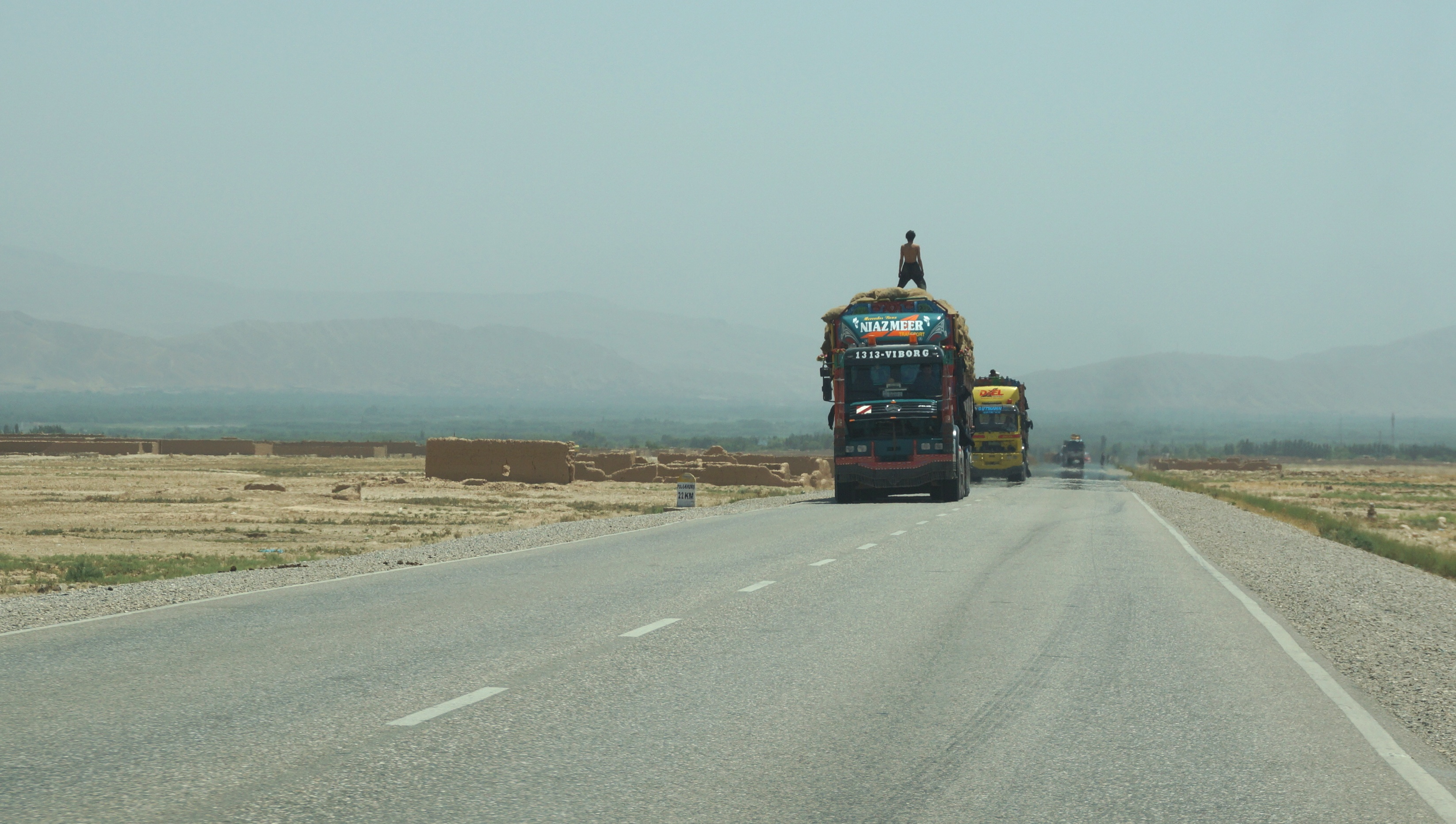
Due to lack of major rail service, transport in Afghanistan is mostly done by road and air.

Afghanistan has five international airports, which include: Kabul International Airport in the capital city; the Mawlana Jalaluddin Mohammad Balkhi International Airport in Mazar-i-Sharif; the Khwaja Abdullah Ansari International Airport in Herat; the Ahmad Shah Baba International Airport in Kandahar; and Khost International Airport in Khost. It also has many domestic airports. The major airlines of the country include Ariana Afghan Airlines and Kam Air. Its national rail network is slowly expanding to connect Central Asia with Pakistan and Iran.

== Tourism ==
Tourism in Afghanistan was at its peak in 1977. Many foreign tourists visited Afghanistan, including from as far away as Europe and North America. After a long halt since 1978, it has restarted. Over 20,000 foreign tourists visit Afghanistan every year. As many as 371,000 Afghans have visited different parts of the country in 2022. Although the country is considered safe now, deadly attacks on tourists could not be ruled out. Certain foreign nationals have been strongly advised by their governments to avoid visiting Afghanistan.

Ariana, Flydubai and Kam Air all provide flight services between Dubai International Airport and Kabul International Airport. The city of Kabul has many guest houses and big hotels, such as the Kabul Grand Hotel, the Hotel Inter-Continental Kabul, the Kabul Taj Hotel, the Safi Landmark Hotel, and the Kabul Star Hotel. Guest houses and hotels are also available in other cities such Kandahar, Herat, Mazar-i-Sharif, Jalalabad, Bamyan and Fayezabad. For those wanting to travel by road, there are bus terminals with mosques, Afghan style restaurants and small shops in the major cities. These bus terminals are now being expanded and shifted to the outskirts of the cities.

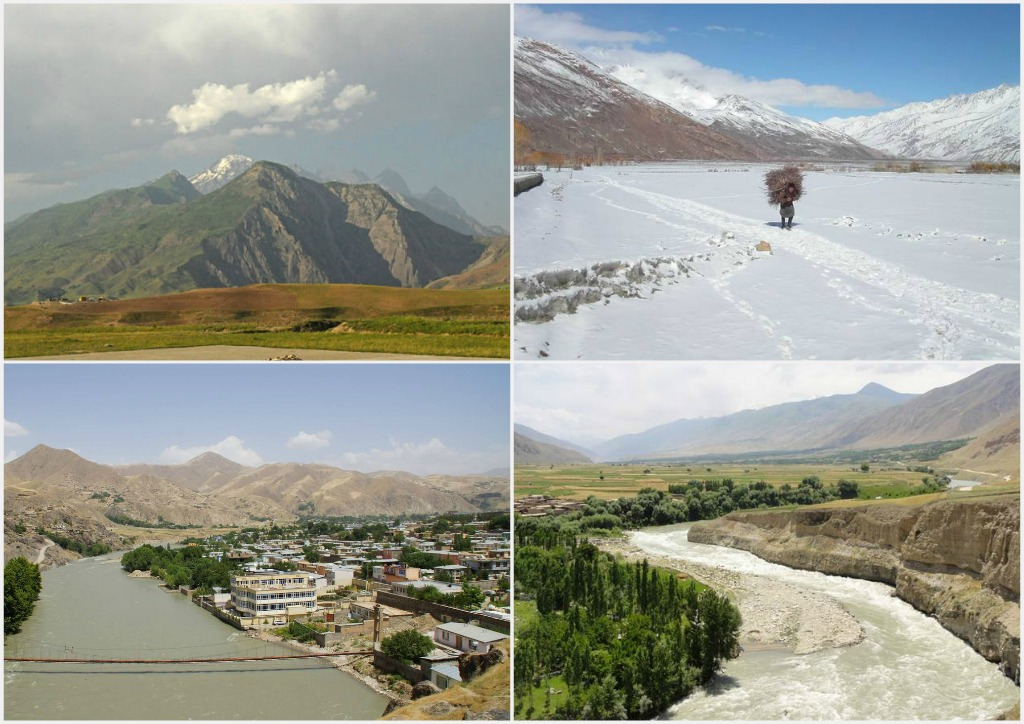
Badakhshan Province

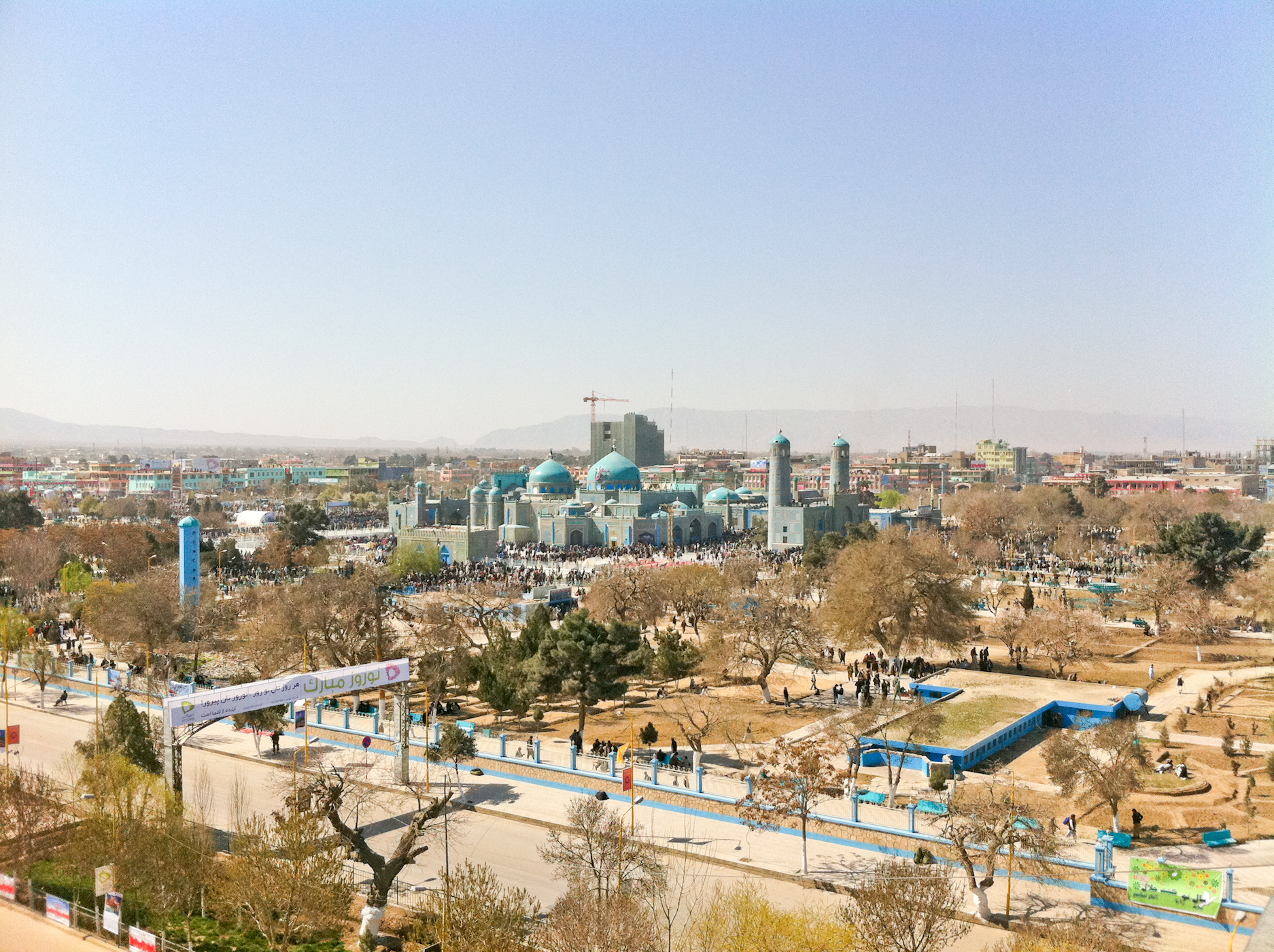
The Blue Mosque in Mazar-i-Sharif

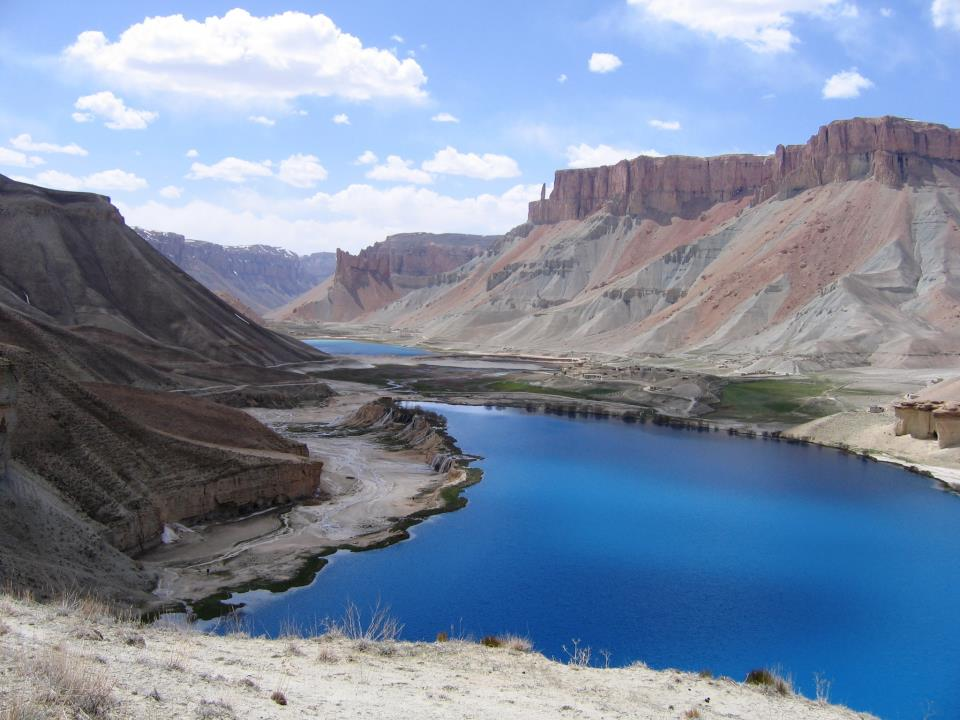
Band-e Amir National Park in the Bamyan Province

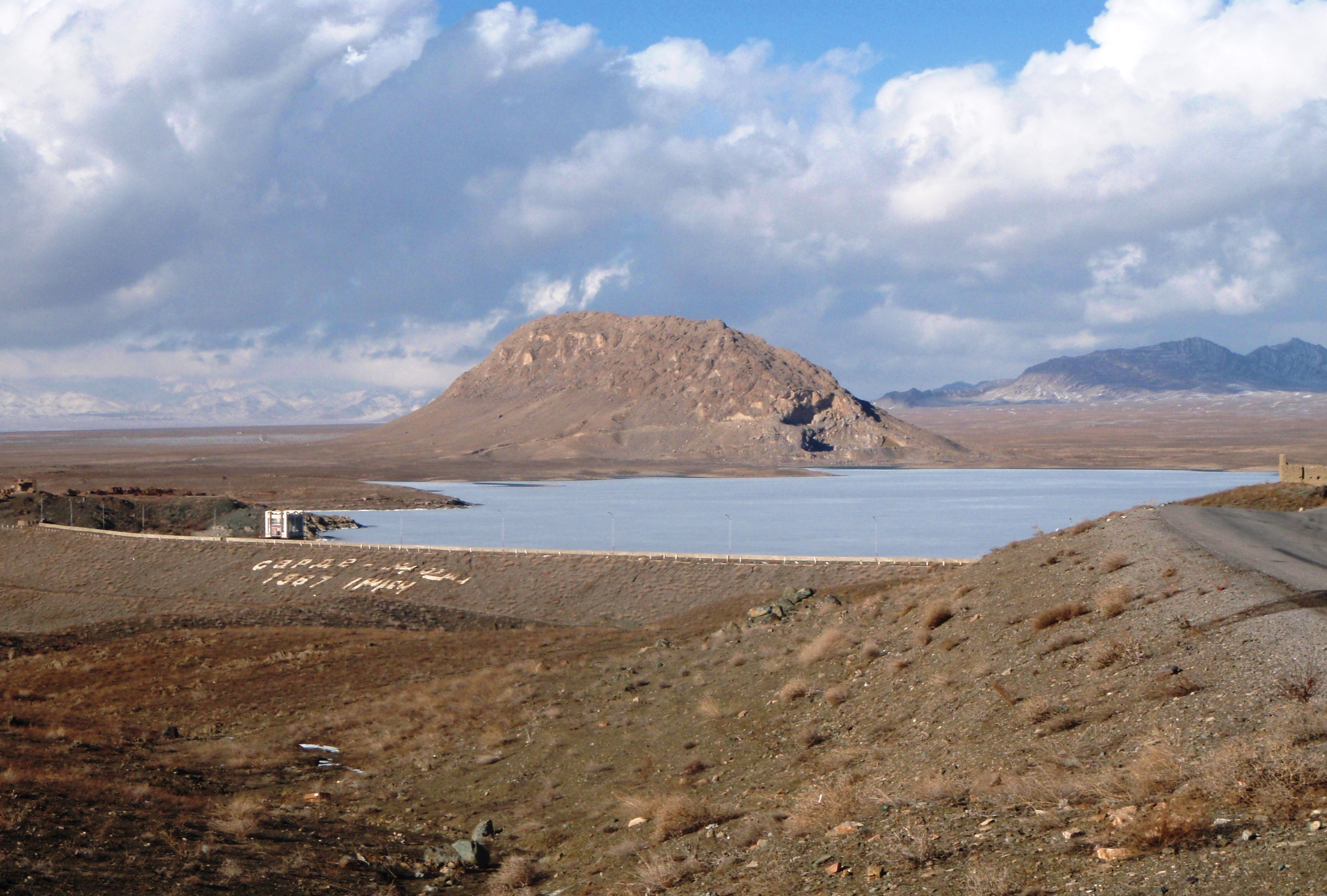
Sarda Dam in Ghazni Province

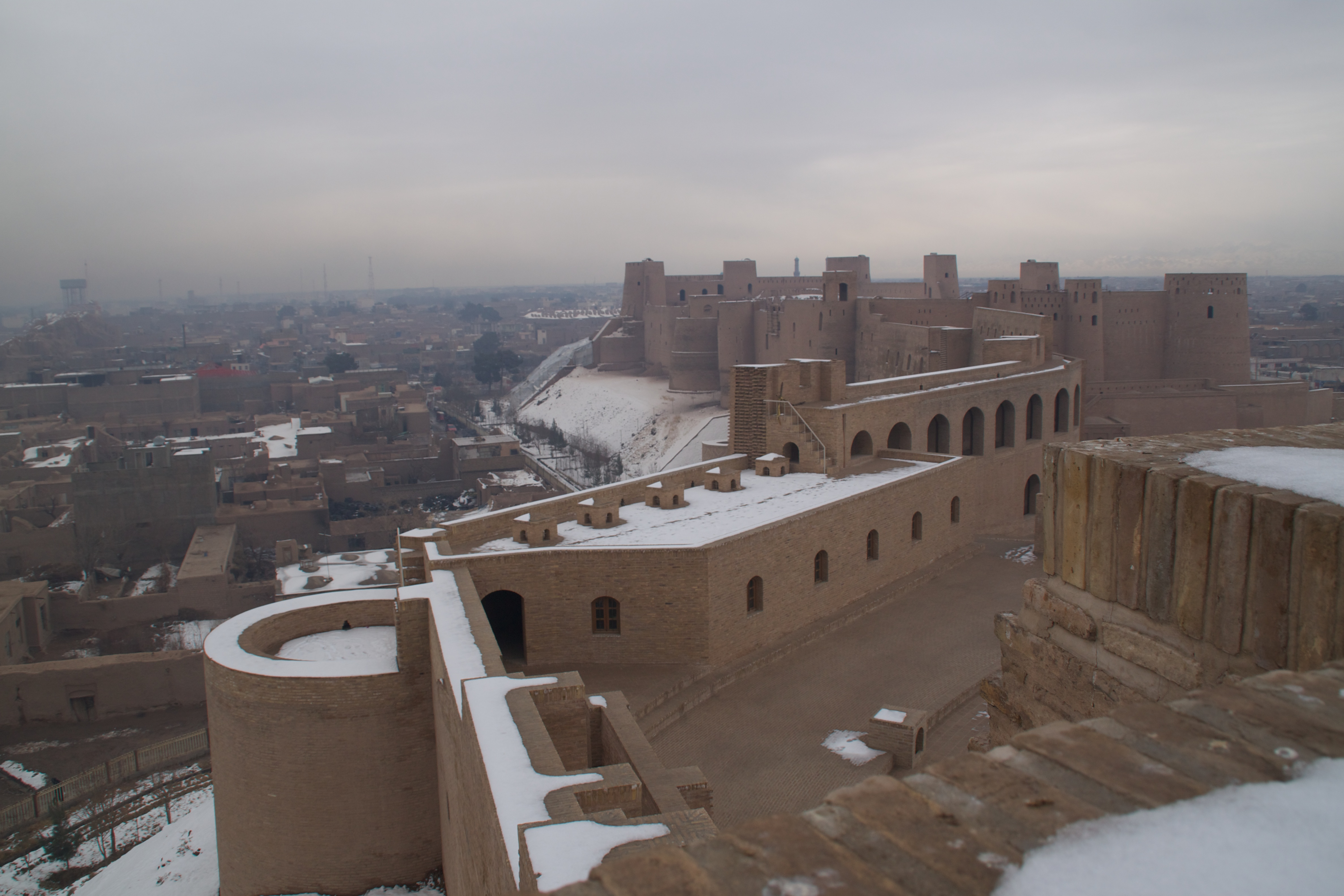
Herat Citadel in Herat

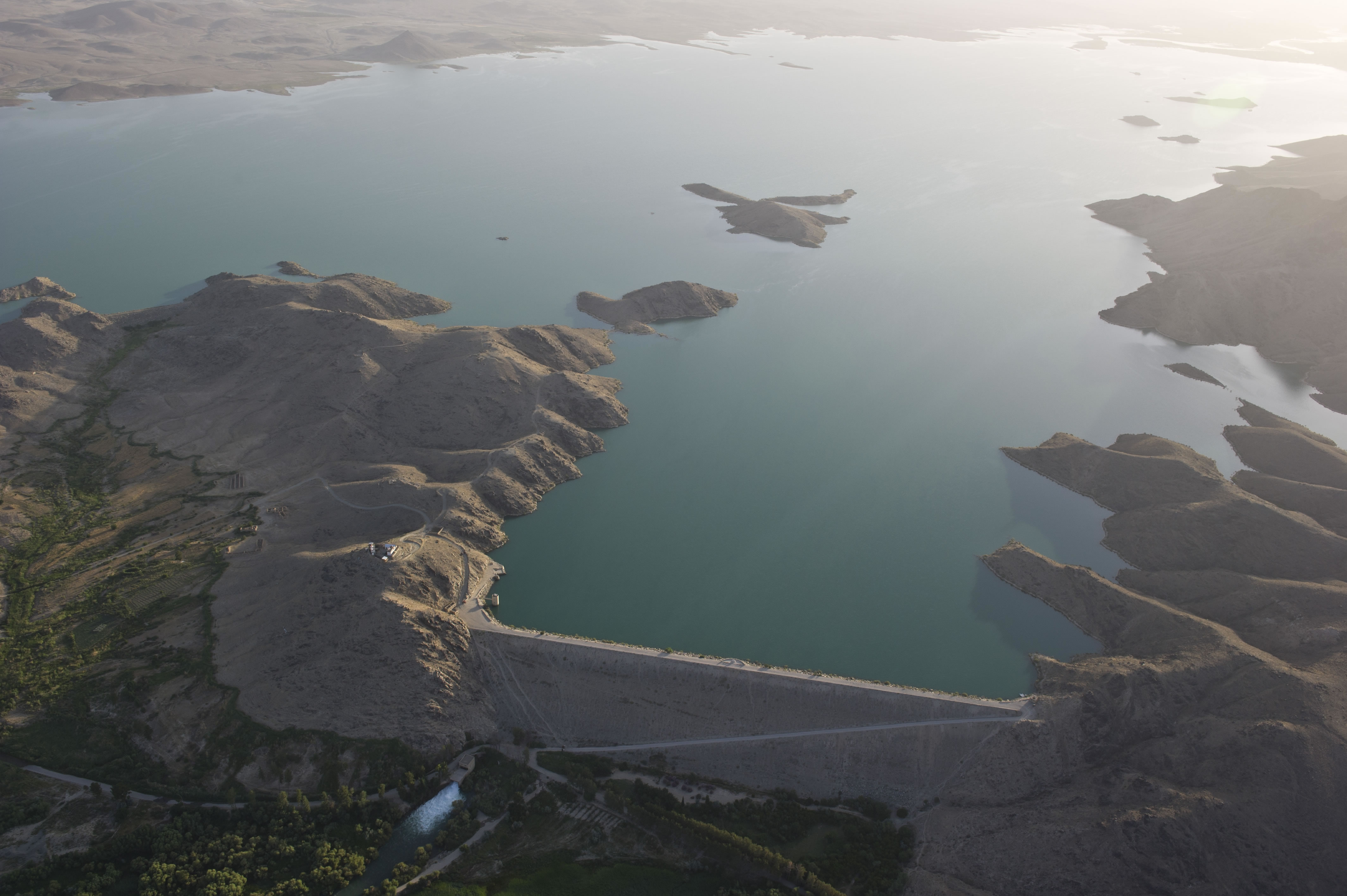
The Dahla Dam in Kandahar Province

The following are some of the notable places in Afghanistan that tourists visit:

- Badakhshan Province
  - Fayzabad
  - Ishkashim (border crossing between Afghanistan and Tajikistan)
  - Wakhan National Park in Wakhan District
- Balkh Province
  - Great Blue Mosque in Mazar-i-Sharif
  - Balkh (ancient town)
  - Hairatan (border crossing between Afghanistan and Uzbekistan)
- Bamyan Province
  - Band-e Amir National Park
  - Site of Buddhas of Bamyan
  - Zuhak
- Ghazni Province
  - Burial site of Al-Biruni
  - Burial site of Mahmud of Ghazni
  - Citadel of Ghazni
  - Jaghori District
  - Sarda Dam in Andar District
  - Sultan Dam in Jaghatu District
- Herat Province
  - Great Mosque of Herat
  - Herat Citadel
  - Islam Qala (border crossing between Afghanistan and Iran)
  - Pashdan Dam
  - Torghundi (border crossing between Afghanistan and Turkmenistan)
  - Salma Dam (Afghanistan-India Friendship Dam)
- Kabul Province
  - Chihil Sutun
  - City Park
  - Darulaman (Darul Aman Palace, Tajbeg Palace, Afghan Parliament, National Museum of Afghanistan, etc.)
  - Gardens of Babur
  - Habibullah Zazai Park
  - Khair Khana
  - Maranjan Hill
  - Paghman
  - Qargha Lake
  - Shahr-e Naw
  - Wazir Akbar Khan Hill
- Kandahar Province
  - Ahmad Shah Durrani's historical house
  - Ayno Maina (modern community with hotels, guest houses, restaurants, shops, parks, etc.)
  - Chilzina Park
  - Dahla Dam in Shah Wali Kot District
  - Mausoleum of Ahmad Shah Durrani
  - Mausoleum of Mirwais Hotak
  - Reg District (Sand District)
  - Shrine of Baba Wali Kandhari
  - Shrine of the Cloak
- Nangarhar Province
  - Jalalabad
  - Ghazi Amanullah International Cricket Stadium (next to Ghazi Amanullah Khan Town)
  - Darunta Dam
- Nimruz Province
  - Zaranj
  - Kamal Khan Dam
- Nuristan Province
  - Nuristan National Park
  - Parun
- Panjshir Province
  - Bazarak
  - Panjshir Valley

== National data ==
The following table shows the main economic indicators in 2002–2023. Inflation below 5% is in green.

Year	GDP (in Bil. US$PPP)	GDP per capita (in US$ PPP)	GDP (in Bil. US$nominal)	GDP per capita (in US$ nominal)	GDP growth (real)	Inflation rate (in Percent)	Government debt (in % of GDP)
2002	22.74	1,083	4.37	208	n/a	n/a	346.0%
2003	▲25.21	▲1,113	▲4.55	▼201	▲8.7%	▲35.7%	▼270.6%
2004	▲26.06	▼1,106	▲5.15	▲218	▲0.7%	▲16.4%	▼245.0%
2005	▲30.05	▲1,231	▲6.17	▲253	▲11.8%	▲10.6%	▼206.4%
2006	▲32.64	▲1,283	▲6.93	▲272	▲5.4%	▲6.8%	▼23.0%
2007	▲38.00	▲1,467	▲8.56	▲330	▲13.3%	▲8.7%	▼20.1%
2008	▲40.23	▲1,522	▲10.30	▲390	▲3.9%	▲26.4%	▼19.1%
2009	▲48.81	▲1,782	▲12.07	▲441	▲20.6%	▼-6.8%	▼16.2%
2010	▲53.57	▲1,900	▲15.33	▲544	▲8.4%	▲2.2%	▼7.7%
2011	▲58.22	▲1,990	▲17.89	▲612	▲6.5%	▲11.8%	▼7.5%
2012	▲67.58	▲2,218	▲20.29	▲666	▲14.0%	▲6.4%	▼6.8%
2013	▲72.64	▲2,303	▼20.17	▼639	▲5.7%	▲7.4%	▲6.9%
2014	▲75.90	▲2,320	▲20.62	▼630	▲2.7%	▲4.7%	▲8.7%
2015	▲77.36	▼2,292	▼20.06	▼594	▲1.0%	▼-0.7%	▲9.2%
2016	▲79.78	▲2,303	▼18.02	▼520	▲2.2%	▲4.4%	▼8.4%
2017	▲83.36	▲2,339	▲18.88	▲530	▲2.6%	▲5.0%	▼8.0%
2018	▲89.37	▲2,436	▼18.34	▼500	▲1.2%	▲0.6%	▼7.4%
2019	▲97.80	▲2,589	▲18.88	▲501	▲3.9%	▲2.3%	▼6.4%
2020	▲100.90	▲2,589	▲20.14	▲517	▼-2.4%	▲5.6%	▲7.8%
2021	▼85.77	▼2,139	▼14.28	▼356	▼-14.5%	▲7.8%	n/a
2022	▲86.15	▼2,094	▲14.50	▼352	▼-6.2%	▲10.6%	n/a
2023	▲91.67	▲2,174	▲17.33	▲411	▲2.7%	▼-7.7%	n/a

Countries by 2019 GDP (nominal) per capita.

Gross national saving: 22.7% of GDP (2017)

Real GDP (purchasing power parity): $82.238 billion (2023 est.)
country comparison to the world: 104

Real GDP growth rate: 4.3% (2025 est.)
comparison ranking: 143

Real GDP per capita: $2,000 (2023 est.)
comparison ranking: 205

GDP (official exchange rate): $17.152 billion (2023 est.)

Inflation rate (consumer prices): -6.6% (2024 est.)
comparison ranking: 1

GDP - composition, by sector of origin:

- agriculture: 34.7% (2023)
- industry: 13.4% (2023)
- services: 46.4% (2023)

GDP - composition, by end use:

- household consumption: 98.1% (2023)
- government consumption: 21.2% (2023)
- investment in fixed capital: 15.2% (2023)
- investment in inventories: 0.1% (2023)
- exports of goods and services: 16.9% (2023)
- imports of goods and services: -50.7% (2023)

country comparison to the world:

Agricultural products: wheat, milk, grapes, watermelons, potatoes, cantaloupes/melons, vegetables, rice, onions, maize (2023)

Industries: small-scale production of bricks, textiles, soap, furniture, shoes, fertilizer, apparel, food-products, non-alcoholic beverages, mineral water, cement; handwoven carpets; natural gas, coal, copper

Industrial production growth rate: 1.8% (2023)
country comparison to the world: 104

Labor force: 9.133 million (2024)
country comparison to the world: 58

Unemployment rate: 13.3% (2024)
country comparison to the world: 168

Labor force - by occupation: agriculture 44.3%, industry 18.1%, services 37.6% (2017)

Population below poverty line: 48% (2024)

Remittances: 1.9% of GDP (2023 est.)

Budget:

- revenues: $9.093 billion (2017 est.)
- expenditures: $7.411 billion (2017 est.)

Taxes and other revenues: 9.9% (of GDP) (2017 est.)
country comparison to the world: 131

Exports: $2 billion (2022)
country comparison to the world: 164

Exports - commodities: coal, grapes, tropical fruits, gum resins, other nuts (2023)

Exports - partners: Pakistan 42%, India 40%, China 4%, UAE 2%, Turkey 2% (2023)

Imports: $7 billion (2022)
country comparison to the world: 125

Imports - commodities: wheat flours, tobacco, palm oil, broadcasting equipment, synthetic fabric (2023)

Imports - partners: United Arab Emirates 28%, Pakistan 15%, China 15%, Uzbekistan 12%, Kazakhstan 9% (2023)

Reserves of foreign exchange and gold: $9.749 billion (2020)
country comparison to the world: 79

Current account balance: $1.014 billion (2017)
country comparison to the world: 49

Currency: Afghani (AFN)

Exchange rates: 65 afghanis to 1 US dollar (2023)

Fiscal year: 21 December - 20 December

== See also ==
- 2025 hunger crisis in Afghanistan
- Afghanistan Accession to World Trade Organization
- Afghanistan and the World Bank
- Afghan frozen assets
- Afghan National Solidarity Programme
- Afghan refugees
- Beauty salons in Afghanistan
- Corruption in Afghanistan
- Golden Crescent
- Human trafficking in Afghanistan
- International sanctions against Afghanistan
- List of companies of Afghanistan
- Poverty in Afghanistan
- Prostitution in Afghanistan
- Slavery in Afghanistan
- Taxation in Afghanistan
- Economic Cooperation Organization
- Economy of South Asia
