= Date palm farming in Afghanistan =

Date palm farming in Afghanistan is less than 10 years old, although it existed since ancient time. It has the potential to become huge again in the future because the country now has around 40 million people who all consume the fruit, especially during the month of Ramadan. The country currently imports nearly all date products from Iran, Pakistan, the United Arab Emirates, Saudi Arabia, and other South Asian and Middle Eastern countries.

Afghan date farming exists in the provinces of Nangarhar, Kandahar, Helmand, Nimruz, Farah and a few others. Various types of dates are produced in the country. In the past, Afghans have been establishing date farms in neighboring Iran and Pakistan. The quality of Afghan dates has yet to be tested but preliminary reports indicate that Afghanistan's climate is very suitable for producing good quality dates. A confirmation of this would naturally make the product reach consumers in China, countries of Central Asia, Russia, and beyond. This is especially so after the completion of the new dams in the country.

The following are the major date farms in Afghanistan:

- Agricultural farm of Al-Gharrafa institute in Farah province, which has over 3,000 date trees.
- Farm-e-Hada in Nangarhar province, which has around 2,700 date trees.

== See also ==
- Economy of Afghanistan
- Ministry of Agriculture, Irrigation and Livestock
