= Beauty salons in Afghanistan =

Beauty salons in Afghanistan are small businesses that have been outlawed by the Taliban. In 1996, they were outlawed by Taliban but were allowed to operate again following overthrow of the Taliban in 2001. The business became one of the main sources of employment for women because of the lack of formal education, vocational knowledge, and limited access to investment. The business attracted attention after Saira Shah’s Beneath the Veil documentation. In 2023, the businesses were outlawed again following the return to power of the Taliban, which resulted in a protest in Kabul.

== Background ==
Beauty salons were forbidden by the Taliban from 1996 to 2001 and reopened after the overthrow of the Taliban in the US invasion of Afghanistan. Beauty salons were represented as one of the few employment opportunities for women in Afghanistan. In 2002, majority of women in Afghanistan worked in the service sector such as beauty salons and tailoring. This situation was possible because working as in other sector requires them to interact with strangers. Most of the women were also identified as having limited vocational knowledge and lacking formal education.

Saira Shah’s Beneath the Veil,which investigates the crimes of the Taliban was first aired on Channel 4 in March 2001 and on CNN in August 2001. In the documentary, beauty salons were called a place of resistance by one of the women in the beauty salon. Following the September 11 attacks, it was aired again on CNN and was watched by five and a half million viewers and becoming the most watched documentaries at that time for CNN. In 17 November 2001, it was aired again coinciding with the release of Report on the Taliban’s War Against Women from the United States Department of State and a radio address from Laura Bush. Both of the report and radio address highlighted the restriction of women in Afghanistan to choose what clothes to wear, use makeup and put on nail polish.

In early 2023, there were thousands of beauty salons in Afghanistan. After retaking power in 2021, the Taliban forbade men from entering beauty salons. Beauty salons were outlawed by Afghanistan's Vice and Virtue Ministry in 2023, who told all such businesses to cease operations before August 2, 2023. In Kabul, on July 19, 2023, about 50 women protested the ban.

== See also ==
- Economy of Afghanistan
- Women in Afghanistan
