= Animal husbandry in Afghanistan =

Animal farming in Afghanistan

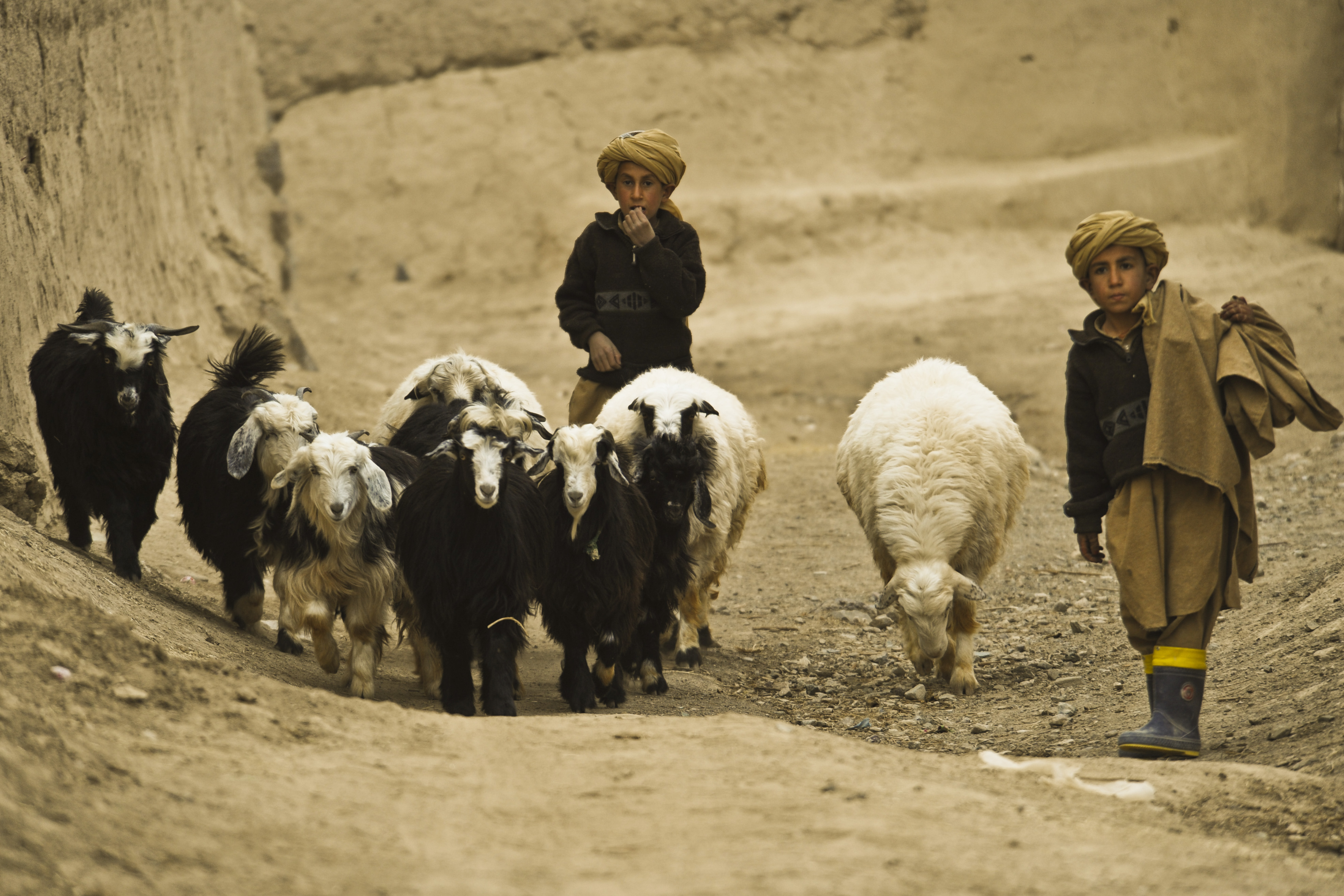
Young boys with a small herd in Zabul Province

Animal husbandry in Afghanistan is a traditional way of life, which exists in all 34 provinces of the country, and continues to play an important role in the nation's economy. The country's livestock population mainly includes cattle, sheep, goats, camels, horses and donkeys. The camels, horses and donkeys are used for work purposes only while the remaining animals are used for consumption and to make dairy and other products. Weddings, zakats and the annual Eid al-Adha boost the sale of these animals.

As a totally Islamic country, pig farming and consumption of pork are simply nonexistent. The wool of the slaughtered sheep is used to make Afghan rugs, parts of Afghan clothing, and other products.

Afghanistan's livestock sector has over 350,000 workers. After the completion of the major Qosh Tepa Canal and new dams, animal husbandry is likely to increase dramatically. Small number of people raise other animals in Afghanistan, such as camels, gazelles, horses, ostriches, turkeys, peacocks, ducks, rabbits, and pigeons.

Poultry farming is widespread, with around 15,000 poultry farms operating in the country. Some of the largest and modern ones are in the provinces of Balkh, Helmand, Kandahar, Khost and Nangarhar. Some egg-laying chickens are also imported from Iran.

== See also ==
- Economy of Afghanistan
- Ministry of Agriculture, Irrigation and Livestock
