= Almond production in Afghanistan =

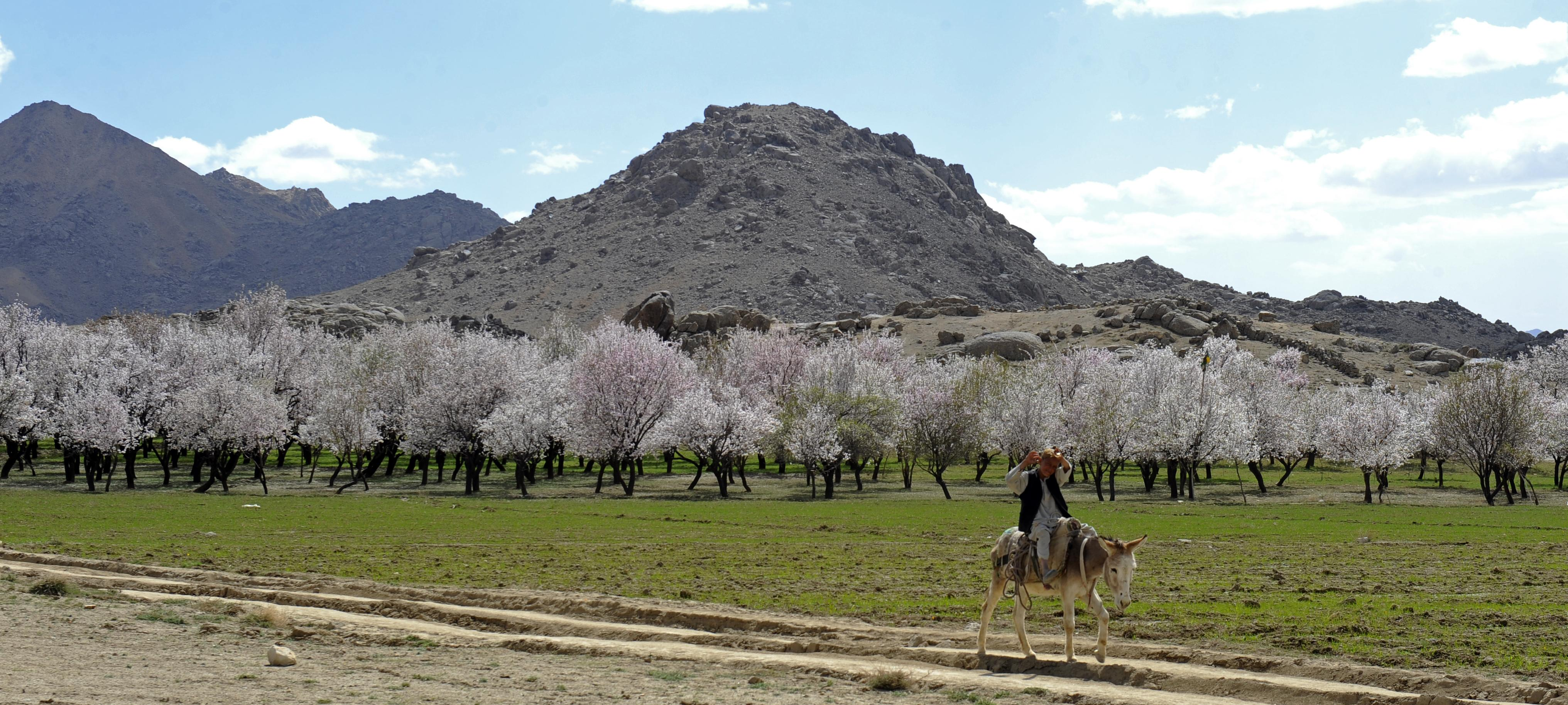
Almond trees in Zabul Province of Afghanistan

Almond production in Afghanistan is a significant contributor to the nation's agricultural economy. In 2009, it was ranked ninth in the FAO list of almond-producing countries of the world, though its domestic production is limited to 2% of the world production. Afghanistan's almond production has shown a rising trend in the recent decades. Within the country, the southwestern and northern regions have the maximum area under cultivation with Kandahar and Samangan provinces, accounting for much of its production, followed by the provinces of Uruzgan, Kunduz, Balkh, Saripul and Daykundi. As of 2012, the cultivated area of almonds was 13,490 ha with a yield rate of 45,960 hectograms (one hectogram = 100 grams) per ha, recording a total yield of 62,000 tonnes, with conducive climatic conditions for growing variety of almond landraces of hard shell and soft shell varieties. The preferred markets for the export of Afghan almonds are India and Pakistan, with the former preferred because of better profitability.

== Varieties ==
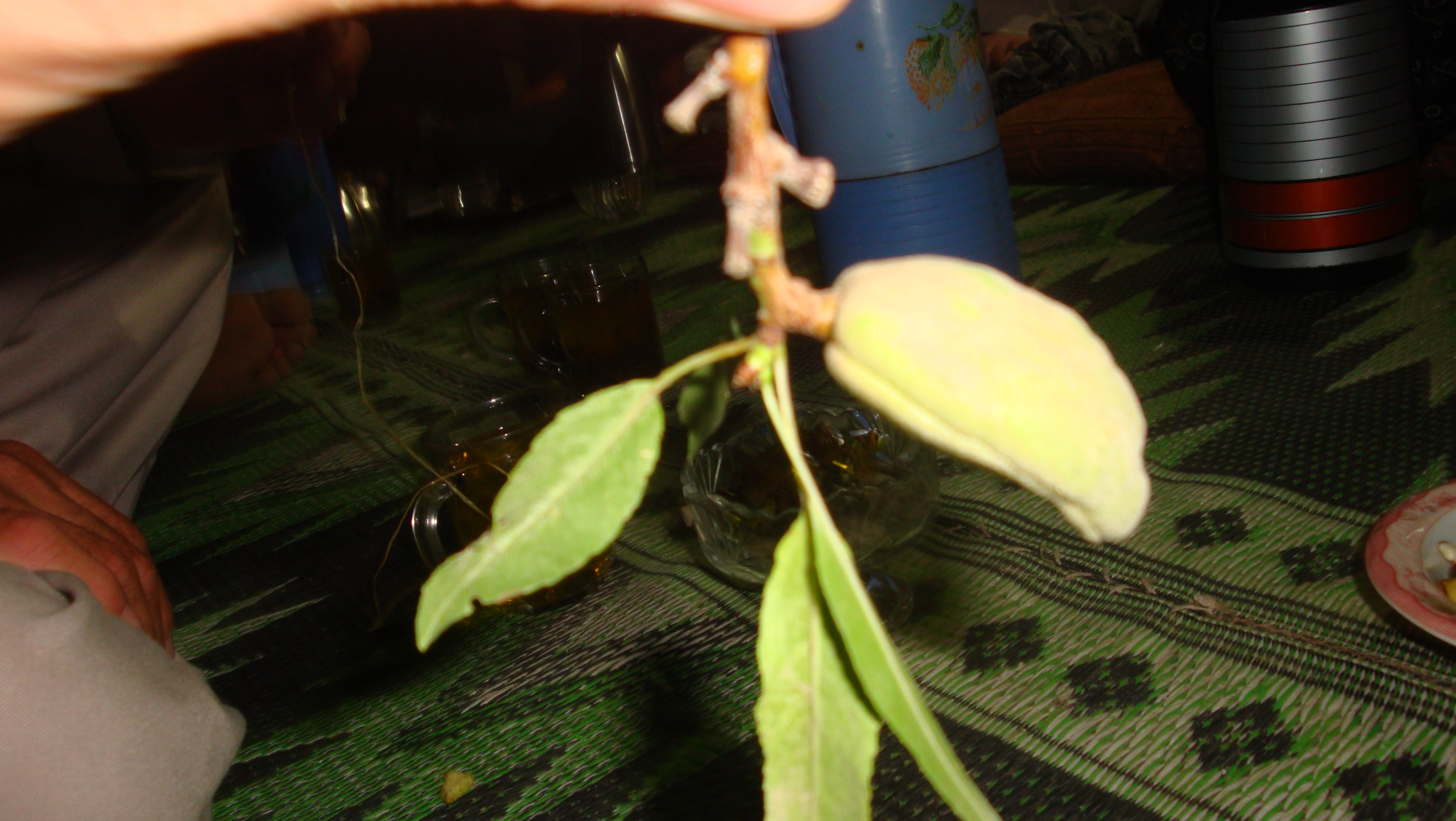
Afghan almond with stalk

Almond is a fruit crop classified under two types, Amygdalus communis (sweet almonds) and Amygdalus amara (bitter almonds). Under this broad classification, in Afghanistan the almond varieties grown are under two major classes: soft-shell almonds, known locally as badam-e kaghaz (literally, "paper almond"), which can be easily broken by hand; and hard/medium-shell almonds with the local name of badam-e-sangi (literally, "stone almond"). These have many sub-types and multiple varieties, such as Sattarbai, which is of the soft-shell class. Sattarbai has other varieties such as Sattarbai Sufi, SattarbaiGuldar, and SattarbaiMamakhail. A study indicates that there are 68 to 99 almond genotypes in the country with varying local names.

To enhance production of almonds under the "Incentives Driving Economic Alternatives for the North, East and West project" (IDEA-NEW), supported by the Agricultural Cooperative Development International and Volunteers in Overseas Cooperative Assistance (ACDI/VOCA), a non-government organization, was set up in 1997. IDEA-NEW furnished 33,000 almond saplings of the almond varieties Satar Baye, Qambari, Qahar Baye, and Zareer Baye were planted in a 100 hectares (250 acres) area in the northern portion of the country to benefit 100 farmers. This has proven to be generally successful in most of the areas surveyed, with a farmer saying: "I am grateful to IDEA-NEW for establishing one big almond orchard for me and providing me with technical assistance on the methods of gardening, like the layout and design of orchard with proper system of irrigation".

Almond farmers in the province of Uruzgan, who have learnt the art of growing almonds in recent times, cultivate the crop as a commercial venture, and the almonds they grow are mostly of the bitter variety, which are mixed with the commercially acceptable variety.

Roots of Peace, a humanitarian organization working in Afghanistan, introduced bee farms along with almond trees to enhance almond yields, though initially this was not acceptable to the local farmers as they believed that bees would harm the plants. Once introduced, the experiment has proven a success with the yield per tree recording an increase of about 40%.

== Production and consumption ==
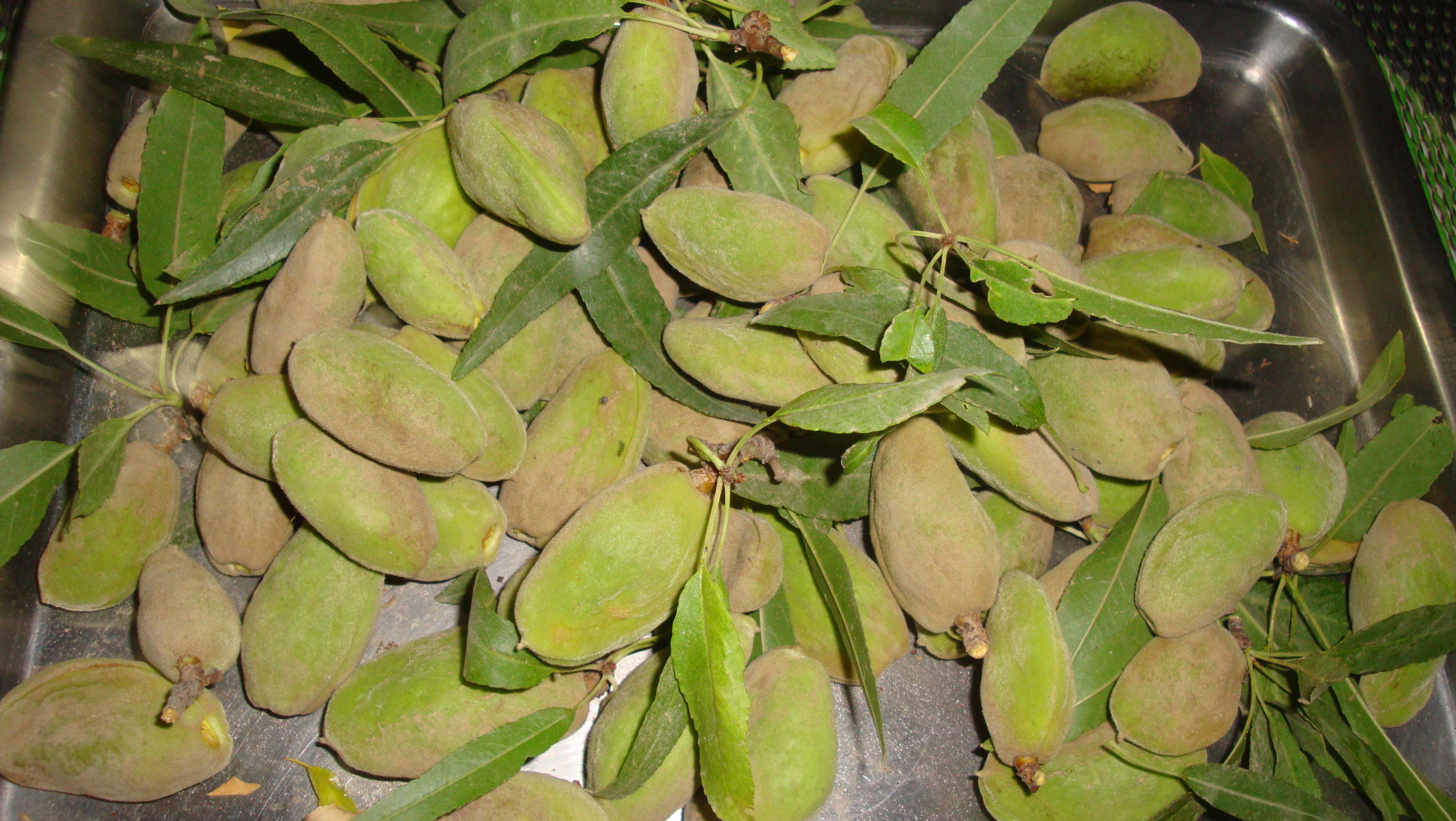
Almonds of Afghanistan

Almond production was recorded at 62,000 metric tons during 2012, a 2% increase over the 2011 figure of 60,610 metric tons. Major production took place in the provinces of Samangan, Baghlan, Takhar and Parwan, with Samangan recording the highest yield. Most of the almonds produced are consumed within the country with only 3% quantity exported. They are marketed both in-shell and shelled. Its export variety is as competitive as the Californian almond and cheaper than the variety marketed by Spain, and therefore exports have a price advantage for export to Central and South Asia.

== See also ==
- Economy of Afghanistan
