= Poverty in Afghanistan =

In Afghanistan, poverty is widespread in rural and urban areas. However, it has been estimated that poverty in Afghanistan is mainly concentrated in rural areas. It has been estimated that four out of five poor people live in rural areas. In these rural areas, families without enough access to adequate nutrition see many infants and children become stunted, malnourished, and die each year. The regions in Afghanistan where almost half of the inhabitants are poor are the eastern, northeastern, and west-central regions. According to the Afghan government's estimates, 42 percent of the Afghanistan's total population lives below the poverty line. Also, 20 percent of people living just above the poverty line are highly vulnerable to falling into poverty.

== Causes ==
The recent rise of poverty rates in Afghanistan can be associated to the stagnating economy. Currently the poverty line is defined as an income of 70 Afghanis a day, which is equivalent to about 1 U.S. dollar. The Afghanistan Living Conditions Survey (ALCS) reported that the national poverty rate has risen from 38% in 2011–12 to 55% in 2016–2017, with the slowing economic growth and a deteriorating security situation as two causes. Over half of the population is living off less than a dollar a day. Another finding from the same report showed that from poverty many other problems branch out, as food insecurity has risen by 14.5% in five years, and despite large population growth, the agricultural industry and unemployment have both become increasingly worse. According to Azarakhsh Hafizi, a member of the Afghanistan Chamber of Commerce, the market economy of Afghanistan cannot operate without the necessary structure of legislation in the government.

Another criticism held by members of the Afghanistan Chamber is that foreign aid is doing more damage than helping, even creating an artificial economy based around foreign aid. Despite this cry against foreign aid, the United Nations Office for the Coordination of Humanitarian Affairs (OCHA) published that in the 2018 Afghanistan Humanitarian Response Plan an estimated $83,368,135 will be donated to the food security and agriculture sector of the economy.

With the return of the Taliban to Afghanistan in 2021, international donors have frozen aid. Restrictions on women's unemployment is estimated to cause an economic loss of 1 billion dollars.

Afghanistan's economy remains in turmoil, with the Taliban struggling to manage governance and secure financial resources, resulting in increasing poverty. As of January 27, 2025, the World Food Programme in Afghanistan could only support half of those in urgent need due to a reduction in aid and an upcoming freeze in U.S. funding. Many Afghans were left with basic meals as aid levels drop.

== Reports ==
The Afghanistan Poverty Status Update was jointly produced by the Government of the Islamic Republic of Afghanistan's Ministry of Economy and the World Bank. It used the National Risk and Vulnerability Assessment (NRVA) data and according to its assessment 36% of Afghan population remained poor in 2007–08 and in 2012. This meant that more than one in three Afghans did not have enough money to buy food or fulfill their basic needs. This was even puzzling as the GDP growth rate during the same period was 6.9%. A report published by the United Nations Children's Fund in 2018 states that for the first time since 2002, the children out-of-school rate has increased, especially in poverty stricken provinces.

Until 2017, no government monitoring on child poverty had taken place in Afghanistan. The Oxford Poverty and Human Development Initiative began working in cooperation with the Central Statistics Organization and the United Nations Children's Fund of Afghanistan to aid the Afghanistan government in creating policies and budgets to help alleviate child poverty.

== Alleviation ==
=== Afghanistan National Development Strategy (ANDS) ===
The Afghanistan National Development Strategy (ANDS) 2008–2013 served as Afghanistan's Poverty Reduction Strategy Paper (PRSP) and used the Afghanistan Compact (2006) as a foundation. The Afghanistan National Development Strategy (ANDS) was launched to serve as the country's poverty reduction strategy. It identifies factors that contribute to poverty such as lack of infrastructure, limited access to markets, social inequity, historical and ongoing conflict, and various productivity constraints.

Until 2017, no government monitoring on child poverty had taken place in Afghanistan. The Oxford Poverty and Human Development Initiative began working in cooperation with the Central Statistics Organization and the United Nations Children's Fund of Afghanistan to aid the Afghanistan government in creating policies and budgets to help alleviate child poverty.

In order to help restart the public health system in Afghanistan after the fall of the Taliban, Afghanistan's Ministry of Public Health created based on the Basic Package of Health Services in 2002. An analysis of the effectiveness of this plan revealed that while the plan was successful in implementing the package to both disabled or female-headed households, the impoverished were still barred off from health centers, hospitals, and private providers that required out-of-pocket payments.

The United Nations Human Refugee Agency (UNHCR) issued a post-return shelter assistance program to assist displaced Afghans coming back to Afghanistan after being refugees in neighboring countries. There was shown to be a 3% decrease in homelessness in areas where this plan was put in place.

== By province ==
As of 2017, the provinces of Kabul, Kapisa, Panjshir, Paktika and Logar were identified as the least poor provinces/most rich provinces on average, while Badghis, Nuristan, Kunduz, Zabul and Samangan were among the poorest. The provinces with the most multidimensionally poor were Herat, Nangarhar, Kandahar, Kunduz and Faryab. By April 18, 2023, around 34 million people, or 90% of Afghanistan’s population, were living in poverty.

== See also ==
- Economy of Afghanistan
- Phantom aid in Afghanistan
