= Tarakhil Power Plant =

Electric power plant near Kabul, Afghanistan

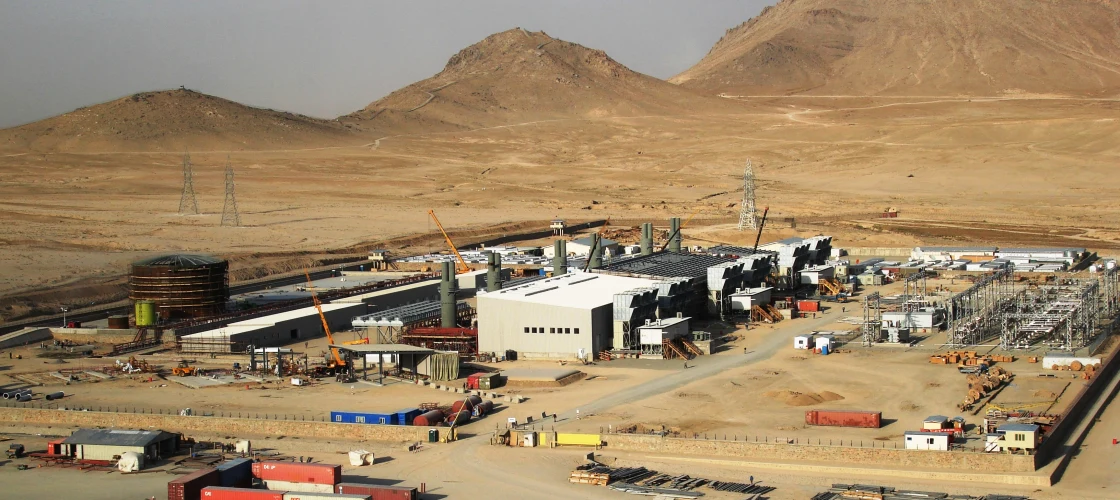
- Country: Afghanistan
- Location: Near Kabul
- Construction began: 2007
- Commission date: 2009
- Construction cost: $335 million USD

Power generation
- Nameplate capacity: 105MW

External links
- Commons: Related media on Commons

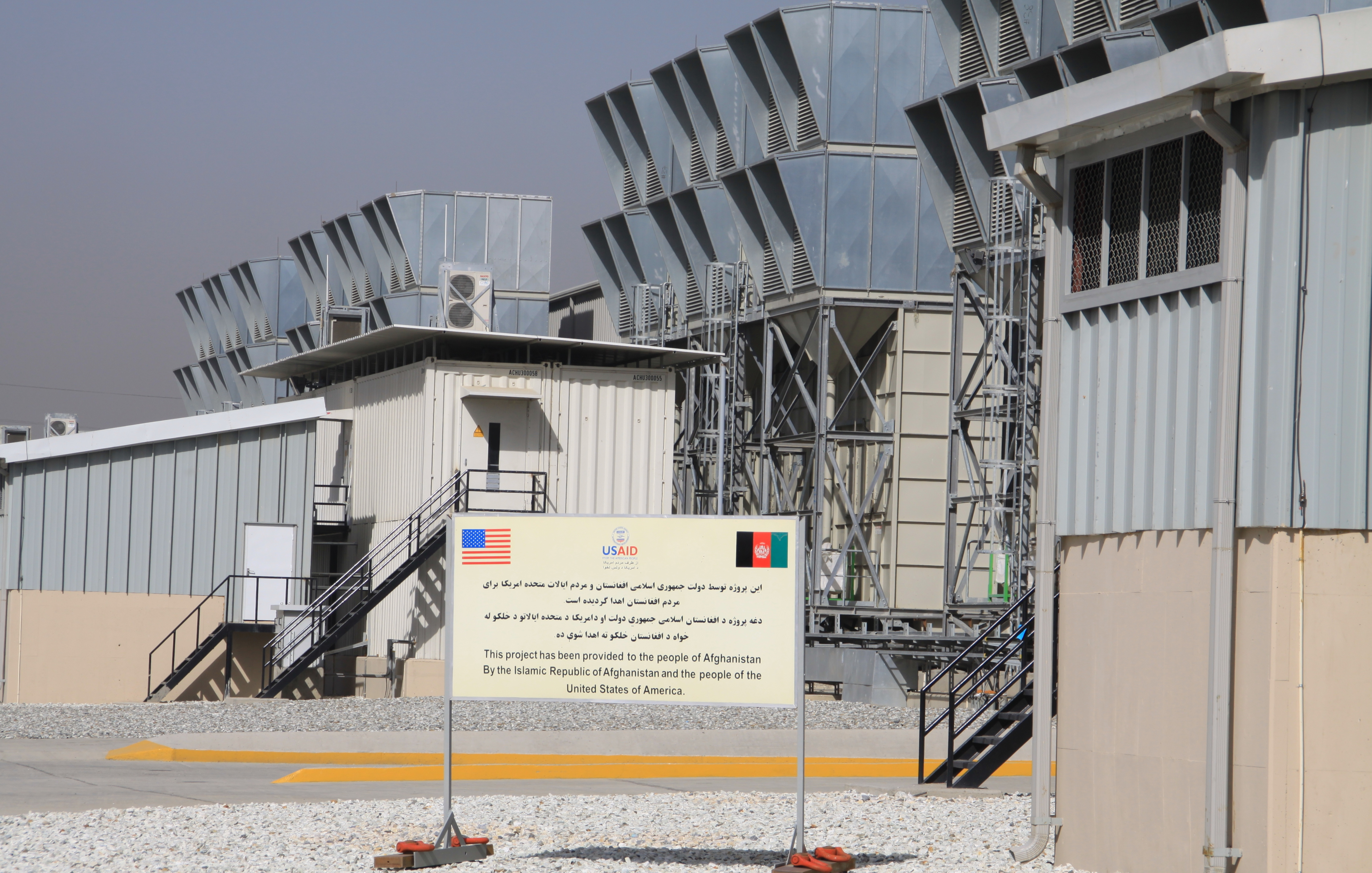
Tarakhil Power Station entrance

The Tarakhil Power Plant is an oil-fired electricity-producing power plant near Kabul, Afghanistan. Backed by USAID, the plant came online in 2009. The plant, built at a cost of $335 million USD and designed to provide a more reliable electricity source for Kabul, has typically operated at a fraction of its capacity and provided meagre annual outputs of electricity. A 2015 report cited the plant's average annual output as 2% of its capacity, due to the high cost of importing diesel fuel into Afghanistan. Press reports have frequently referred to the plant as the "white elephant of Kabul".

== History ==
Land for the plant was donated by Afghan president Hamid Karzai in 2007. Construction, executed by the US firm Black & Veatch, began the same year. The plant was opened in 2009. While USAID had estimated that the plant would cost only $120 million USD, it ultimately cost $335 million.

== Operations ==
At full capacity, the plant burns 600,000 litres (130,000 imp gal; 160,000 US gal) of diesel fuel per day. Designed to provide a more reliable electricity source for Kabul, from July 2010 to December 2013, the plant produced 2.2 percent of its rated nameplate capacity. Between 2014 and 2015, the plant produced less than 0.5% of Kabul's electricity needs.
