= List of countries by grape production =

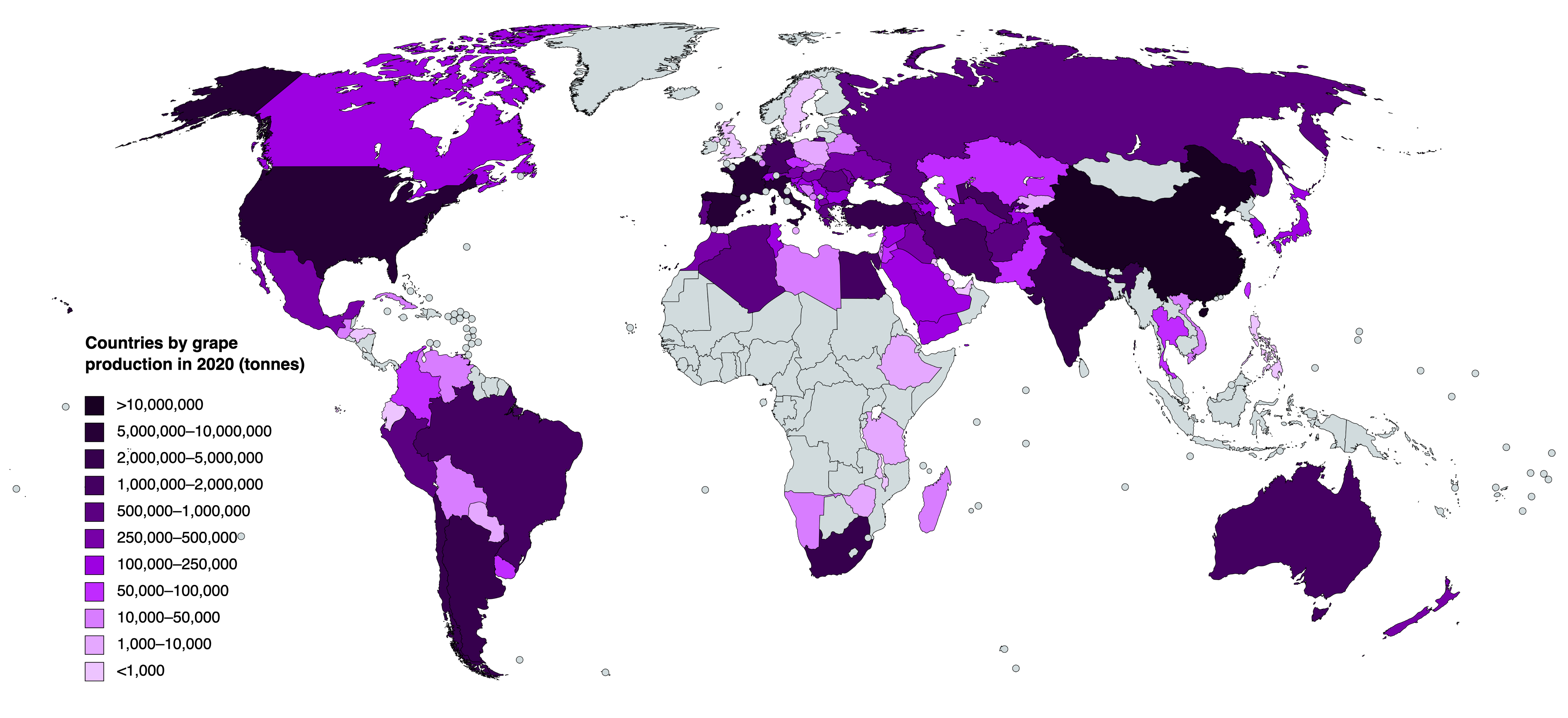
Countries by grape production in 2020

This is a list of countries by grape production from the years 2017 to 2022, based on data from the Food and Agriculture Organization Corporate Statistical Database. The estimated total world production for grapes in 2022 was 74,942,573 metric tonnes, down by 2.4% from 76,750,674 tonnes in 2021. France was the largest producer of grapes, accounting for 16.8% of global production. Italy came second at 11.3%, followed by Spain at 8.3%.

== Production by country ==
=== >1,000,000 tonnes ===
Rank	Country/region	2022	2021	2020	2019	2018	2017
1	France	12,600,000	14,998,000	14,314,100	14,195,400	13,666,800	13,082,900
2	Italy	8,437,970	8,149,400	8,222,360	7,900,120	8,513,640	7,169,745
3	Spain	6,199,950	5,073,590	5,875,870	5,489,650	6,267,790	5,011,054
4	United States	5,902,040	6,086,920	6,817,770	5,745,450	6,983,260	5,387,403
5	China	5,372,800	5,474,860	5,479,400	6,314,915	6,890,980	6,698,520
6	Turkey	4,170,000	3,670,000	4,210,000	4,100,000	3,930,000	4,200,000
7	India	3,401,000	3,358,000	3,181,000	3,041,000	2,920,000	2,922,000
8	Chile	2,402,686	2,339,343	2,434,664	2,714,691	2,828,021	2,383,095
9	South Africa	2,064,742	2,000,297	2,008,242	1,883,869	1,901,736	2,032,582
10	Argentina	1,936,803	2,241,420	2,055,746	2,519,886	2,573,311	1,965,206
11	Uzbekistan	1,760,559	1,695,259	1,606,942	1,603,308	1,589,784	1,625,511
12	Egypt	1,571,989	1,472,418	1,184,000	1,595,380	1,641,075	1,734,424
13	Brazil	1,450,805	1,748,206	1,435,538	1,485,806	1,592,031	1,743,430
14	Iran	1,417,944	1,614,555	1,839,909	1,945,930	1,915,050	1,765,538
15	Australia	1,228,829	1,885,537	1,474,911	1,553,602	1,663,557	1,824,431
16	Germany	1,220,000	1,150,000	1,150,000	1,130,000	1,400,000	1,010,000

=== 100,000–1,000,000 tonnes ===
Rank	Country/region	2022	2021	2020	2019	2018	2017
17	Peru	918,898	826,370	733,472	639,815	645,545	645,012
18	Afghanistan	910,000	993,884	993,382	1,112,927	984,081	923,831
19	Portugal	903,510	977,670	853,380	864,850	802,080	868,635
20	Russia	889,500	751,494	681,908	677,997	627,739	580,077
21	Greece	815,980	828,280	815,790	807,570	933,150	827,537
22	Romania	804,800	1,005,280	932,770	973,990	1,140,570	1,067,120
23	Algeria	627,325	630,022	554,201	549,833	502,978	566,579
24	Moldova	572,972	492,384	462,050	658,726	730,171	675,056
25	New Zealand	532,000	370,000	457,000	413,000	411,511	396,000
26	Mexico	457,752	433,985	453,520	472,708	430,658	404,585
27	Hungary	414,550	437,750	435,050	457,250	533,070	529,592
28	Iraq	384,984	427,356	421,868	420,466	123,083	99,444
29	Austria	336,990	328,040	319,790	309,920	367,130	331,428
30	Turkmenistan	329,648	326,758	326,714	325,121	318,458	316,113
31	Morocco	319,998	420,113	396,903	459,500	451,158	378,128
32	Georgia	287,300	271,600	316,900	293,800	259,900	180,800
33	North Macedonia	265,556	269,131	317,550	258,960	294,497	180,349
34	Ukraine	257,880	264,120	280,960	366,300	467,630	409,610
35	Tajikistan	256,790	248,546	248,158	247,167	241,892	228,303
36	Syria	228,590	212,507	243,347	252,006	223,383	239,337
37	Armenia	225,816	237,059	283,224	217,524	179,668	209,954
38	Albania	217,883	212,011	199,069	189,904	184,832	202,948
39	Azerbaijan	212,645	209,843	208,019	201,842	167,591	152,843
40	Tunisia	166,000	140,000	150,000	148,000	154,000	146,600
41	Japan	162,600	165,100	163,400	172,700	174,700	176,100
42	Serbia	162,481	155,718	160,307	163,516	149,474	165,568
43	Bulgaria	161,720	178,300	159,100	178,530	201,530	201,529
44	South Korea	155,084	168,150	165,906	166,159	175,399	190,265
45	Yemen	142,601	145,591	136,555	134,187	122,751	129,687
46	Switzerland	125,701	77,290	105,739	124,061	140,742	100,364
47	Croatia	117,500	116,210	123,550	108,300	146,240	116,307
48	Saudi Arabia	110,500	106,400	101,570	117,639	44,845	44,505
49	Pakistan	108,538	107,542	89,481	82,173	68,471	66,987
50	Uruguay	106,672	102,616	96,825	86,229	104,932	95,691

=== 10,000–100,000 tonnes ===
Rank	Country/region	2021	2020	2019	2018	2017	2017
51	Czech Republic	91,760	90,060	90,380	67,960	103,700	79,774
52	Canada	90,182	104,203	104,709	121,511	108,398	131,112
53	Kazakhstan	82,727	87,035	95,061	90,405	88,547	81,223
54	Slovenia	81,890	84,300	103,780	105,200	127,130	89,416
55	Thailand	79,741	79,841	79,509	79,794	80,219	78,513
56	Taiwan	72,896	69,900	74,003	88,635	97,799	92,602
57	Israel	65,030	60,520	46,174	57,100	63,000	68,503
58	Lebanon	56,006	59,221	62,955	62,014	51,670	77,440
59	Slovakia	44,840	44,070	46,920	43,040	52,420	45,859
60	Jordan	42,183	29,361	43,003	53,886	59,755	53,509
61	Namibia	37,928	40,200	34,815	33,012	28,500	31,500
62	Palestine	36,194	33,806	36,514	34,379	63,440	41,317
63	Belarus	34,865	36,357	32,692	31,000	33,000	22,000
64	Colombia	34,559	32,298	28,009	67,632	57,472	30,299
65	Bolivia	27,524	27,990	22,235	23,549	22,674	22,066
66	Vietnam	26,386	27,147	27,493	26,141	25,165	26,255
67	Libya	24,878	29,520	31,377	1,409	31,500	32,303
68	Bosnia and Herzegovina	22,977	42,012	44,695	39,289	40,408	28,013
69	Cyprus	21,890	23,130	23,140	22,760	22,380	22,823
70	Venezuela	21,123	19,933	19,398	20,400	19,749	20,065
71	Cuba	20,514	20,517	20,519	20,257	20,148	20,291
72	Guatemala	19,946	20,010	19,973	19,855	20,201	19,861
73	Montenegro	18,455	22,998	21,269	20,864	24,441	22,202
74	Madagascar	13,582	13,544	13,503	13,470	13,553	13,468
75	Luxembourg	11,810	13,360	12,950	10,160	18,100	10,806

=== <10,000 tonnes ===
Rank	Country/region	2022	2021	2020	2019	2018	2017
76	Kyrgyzstan	7,331	7,404	9,268	8,857	8,774	8,607
77	Poland	5,200	3,700	3,600	3,210	3,920	
78	Ethiopia	4,844	4,824	4,847	4,862	4,762	4,916
79	Tanzania	4,838	4,893	4,948	4,997	4,975	5,139
80	Malta	3,600	2,640	2,890	3,240	4,110	3,628
81	Zimbabwe	3,453	3,462	3,457	3,442	3,486	3,442
82	Netherlands	2,100	1,930	1,700	1,600	1,700	400
83	Paraguay	1,930	1,935	1,927	1,930	1,930	1,930
84	Ecuador	551	545	539	535	541	537
85	United Kingdom	513	511	512	517	506	512
86	Philippines	212	207	212	214	212	213
87	Malawi	211	210	174	180	240	226
88	Kuwait	205	180	167	146	214	144
89	Honduras	186	185	184	184	183	181
90	Bahrain	155	154	153	152	150	152
91	Sweden	140	130	160	70	60	
92	United Arab Emirates	35	35	35	35	35	34
93	Qatar	5	3	1		5	4
