= List of countries by vegetable production =

This is a list of countries by vegetable production in 2020 based on the Food and Agriculture Organization Corporate Statistical Database. The total world vegetable production for 2020 was 1,148,446,252 metric tonnes. In 1961, production was 198 million tonnes.

== Production by country ==
The table shows the countries with the largest production of vegetables (lettuce, lentil, beans, onion, chickpea, pulses, eggplant, cauliflower, broccoli, spinach, potato, cassava, soybean, carrot, cucumber, ginger, rapeseed, yams, sweet potato, sesame, okra).

Rank	Country/Region	Vegetable production (tonnes)
1	People's Republic of China	594,049,398
2	India	141,195,036
3	United States	33,124,467
4	Turkey	25,960,714
5	Vietnam	17,002,195
6	Egypt	16,135,024
7	Nigeria	15,706,483
8	Mexico	15,098,212
9	Russia	13,950,679
10	Spain	12,668,790
11	Iran	12,623,192
12	Indonesia	12,581,898
13	Italy	10,849,360
14	Japan	10,221,895
15	Uzbekistan	9,903,740
16	Ukraine	9,675,389
17	South Korea	9,476,881
18	Brazil	8,373,666
19	Algeria	7,986,465
20	Bangladesh	7,138,722
21	Philippines	6,624,100
22	Pakistan	5,572,793
23	Netherlands	5,293,140
24	Myanmar	4,820,496
25	Kazakhstan	4,450,783
26	France	4,422,070
27	Poland	4,320,800
28	Nepal	4,169,485
29	Morocco	3,983,906
30	Sudan	3,868,342
31	Kenya	3,602,389
32	Germany	3,437,190
33	Niger	3,333,839
34	North Korea	3,318,019
35	Argentina	3,209,268
36	Tunisia	3,138,362
37	Cameroon	3,051,807
38	Peru	2,943,057
39	Thailand	2,820,271
40	Tanzania	2,772,533
41	South Africa	2,636,219
42	Mali	2,535,287
43	United Kingdom	2,525,470
44	Colombia	2,450,822
45	Tajikistan	2,374,585
46	Canada	2,241,369
47	Belgium	2,095,600
48	Syria	2,088,946
49	Portugal	2,288,910
50	Chile	2,134,555
51	Taiwan	2,080,502
52	Greece	1,918,930
53	Malawi	1,824,553
54	Afghanistan	1,822,632
55	Romania	1,798,720
56	Belarus	1,782,395
57	Azerbaijan	1,740,427
58	Iraq	1,733,642
59	Ethiopia	1,622,146
60	Cuba	1,628,116
61	Australia	1,588,764
62	Laos	1,533,045
63	Jordan	1,401,350
64	Uganda	1,380,470
65	Sri Lanka	1,306,938
66	Israel	1,247,103
67	Guatemala	1,238,156
68	Venezuela	1,221,274
69	Malaysia	1,171,544
70	Kyrgyzstan	1,101,996
71	Saudi Arabia	1,052,171
72	Senegal	1,000,629
1,000,000–10,000,000 tonnes
73	Albania	988,507
74	Mozambique	981,152
75	New Zealand	886,443
76	Dominican Republic	873,844
77	Oman	836,190
78	Bosnia and Herzegovina	799,683
79	Ghana	788,396
80	Ivory Coast	770,581
81	Angola	743,741
82	Benin	702,795
83	North Macedonia	695,920
84	Libya	688,745
85	Lebanon	680,318
86	Turkmenistan	678,063
87	Serbia	669,062
88	Hungary	666,410
89	Rwanda	661,274
90	Cambodia	624,613
91	Armenia	599,918
92	Democratic Republic of the Congo	591,691
93	Austria	588,640
94	Guinea	561,210
95	Papua New Guinea	560,596
96	South Sudan	496,999
97	Burundi	482,675
98	Yemen	480,563
99	Sierra Leone	468,497
100	Palestine	465,434
101	Madagascar	455,672
102	Zambia	434,774
103	Ecuador	421,052
104	Switzerland	399,411
105	Bolivia	392,752
106	Kuwait	376,740
107	Honduras	363,892
108	Sweden	342,880
109	Bulgaria	340,500
110	Burkina Faso	302,869
111	Finland	270,240
112	Jamaica	266,000
113	Denmark	253,830
114	Nicaragua	236,147
115	United Arab Emirates	233,009
116	Zimbabwe	228,485
117	Moldova	222,946
118	Czech Republic	203,050
119	Guyana	194,361
120	Ireland	187,590
121	Norway	185,195
122	Costa Rica	177,115
123	Georgia	176,100
124	Uruguay	174,117
125	Croatia	166,310
126	Lithuania	164,250
127	Paraguay	153,840
128	Haiti	152,995
129	Togo	149,504
130	Republic of the Congo	142,528
131	Slovenia	133,108
132	Mongolia	121,569
133	El Salvador	121,223
134	Liberia	120,806
135	Chad	110,564
136	Slovakia	106,930
137	Somalia	104,260
100,000–1,000,000 tonnes
138	Central African Republic	95,169
139	Botswana	81,439
140	Qatar	71,035
141	Latvia	68,500
142	Namibia	65,405
143	Mauritius	56,606
144	Fiji	55,316
145	Eritrea	54,883
146	Panama	51,842
147	Gabon	50,018
148	Cyprus	49,940
149	Bhutan	48,273
150	Malta	40,050
151	Puerto Rico	39,838
152	Guinea-Bissau	39,426
153	Hong Kong	36,371
154	Djibouti	35,486
155	Bahamas	33,388
156	Timor-Leste	32,945
157	Lesotho	31,936
158	Cape Verde	30,500
159	Tonga	27,320
160	Estonia	26,810
161	Singapore	25,569
162	Montenegro	22,564
163	Suriname	22,204
164	Trinidad and Tobago	18,420
165	Bahrain	18,179
166	Vanuatu	13,273
167	Eswatini	13,154
168	Gambia	12,828
169	Belize	11,854
170	Barbados	10,563
10,000–100,000 tonnes
171	Brunei	9,858
172	New Caledonia	8,749
173	Dominica	7,145
174	Grenada	6,438
175	Solomon Islands	6,042
176	Kiribati	5,993
177	Comoros	5,295
178	Saint Vincent and the Grenadines	5,056
179	French Polynesia	5,011
180	Mauritania	4,794
181	Iceland	4,650
182	São Tomé and Príncipe	3,691
183	Federated States of Micronesia	3,543
184	Luxembourg	3,460
185	Saint Lucia	3,179
186	Seychelles	3,001
187	Maldives	2,611
188	Cook Islands	1,880
189	Samoa	1,318
<1,000 tonnes
190	Antigua and Barbuda	847
191	Saint Kitts and Nevis	687
192	Tuvalu	596
193	Nauru	465
194	Niue	143

== World production ==
World production in tonnes.

Year	Production
1961	197,671,814
1962	196,715,193
1963	197,456,216
1964	199,990,920
1965	202,754,670
1966	210,055,185
1967	217,391,148
1968	223,144,023
1969	225,787,672
1970	224,755,551

Year	Production
1971	234,107,826
1972	232,383,229
1973	245,911,746
1974	253,000,158
1975	258,240,178
1976	259,662,192
1977	271,567,493
1978	287,487,480
1979	292,551,466
1980	290,296,229

Year	Production
1981	304,430,900
1982	320,997,192
1983	327,336,913
1984	352,900,356
1985	355,672,363
1986	377,278,383
1987	384,438,108
1988	394,252,404
1989	407,857,861
1990	418,766,676

Year	Production
1991	420,137,589
1992	434,676,614
1993	462,473,461
1994	486,468,064
1995	512,780,209
1996	542,738,059
1997	551,844,581
1998	572,757,665
1999	615,205,362
2000	686,643,002

Year	Production
2001	705,280,012
2002	727,270,140
2003	758,206,091
2004	768,465,892
2005	789,725,045
2006	820,287,834
2007	855,731,062
2008	889,497,326
2009	915,993,340
2010	938,781,301

Year	Production
2011	974,818,555
2012	999,784,428
2013	1,021,617,554
2014	1,056,014,216
2015	1,084,174,676
2016	1,087,828,966
2017	1,109,345,242
2018	1,111,045,830
2019	1,129,672,958
2020	1,148,446,252
