= Afghanistan and the World Bank =

Afghanistan is a World Bank Group member country. It has received financial support from the organization since 2002. The World Bank provides loans and grants to support its development and reconstruction efforts. The World Bank has not been granted access to operate directly within Afghanistan under the current regime, limiting its ability to monitor, manage, or distribute aid and development funding transparently. The bank aims to help Afghanistan with matters such as poverty reduction, infrastructure development, education, and governance. Afghanistan collaborates with the World Bank on various policy initiatives and reforms to promote economic growth and stability.

== Projects ==
=== Health Emergency Response (HER) w/UNICEF and WHO ===
- The HER project ensures that national coverage of basic health services continues for the Afghan people. It sustains local basic health service providers such that basic health services continue across the country covering 70% of the total population. There were over $216.8m in contracts signed for health care services for the project duration. 623K children have received vaccinations and over 3.6 million infants received nutrition services.

=== Emergency Food Security (EFSP)w/ FAO ===
- EFSP seeds agricultural inputs, watershed management and cash for work for farming communities. It sustains local farmers' associations and disburses $50 million worth of seeds for 300k farmers, reaching 2.1 million people. 20 micro irrigation scheme designs have been completed. 54 watershed sub-projects to create job opportunities through cash-for-work activities for more than 280,000 beneficiaries were under way as of 2022.

=== Community Resilience Livelihoods (CRL) w/UNOPS ===
- CRP provides cash for improved access to basic services. It focuses on women and vulnerable populations. It sustains critical community institutions for service delivery. Consultations and cash-for-work activities started in 1,000 rural communities in 48 districts and 17 provinces.Six urban labor-intensive work projects with a pipeline of 175 projects.

=== Emergency Education Response in Afghanistan (EERA) W/ UNICEF ===
- EERA works with community-based education institutions to provide learning opportunities. 250 community based education classes were established to enable secondary education for girls after the government banned girls from school. Six small innovative grassroot level block grants are supported.

=== NSO Capacity Building W/ UNDP ===
- This project strengthens the capacities of selected NGOs and COs involved in providing basic services for the most vulnerable. This was a challenging sector given IT's restrictions on NGOs/CSOs.
