= Afghanistan accession to World Trade Organization =

Afghanistan received membership to the World Trade Organization (WTO) at the 10th WTO Ministerial Conference in Nairobi, Kenya, December 17, 2015. Afghanistan is 164th in the world and 36th among the less-developed countries that have received WTO membership.

Receiving WTO membership is a long process; Afghanistan was admitted after 11 years of negotiations. Afghanistan is among the least developed countries in the WTO and there are some expectations that their accession might impact newly emerged industries in the country.

== The background of WTO ==
After World War II, the original intention was to create a third institution to handle the trade side of international economic cooperation, joining the two “Bretton Woods” institutions: the World Bank and the International Monetary Fund. Over 50 countries participated in negotiations to create an International Trade Organization (ITO) as a specialized agency of the United Nations. However, these negotiations failed as the draft ITO Charter extended beyond world trade disciplines.

Meanwhile, 15 countries had begun talks in December 1945 to reduce and bind customs tariffs. With the Second World War having only recently ended, they wanted to give an early boost to trade liberalization and begin to correct the legacy of protectionist measures which remained in place from the early 1930s.

As a result of these negotiations, the new General Agreement on Tariffs and Trade (GATT) was born, with 23 founding members (officially “contracting parties”), in Geneva in 1947.

For almost half a century (until 1994), the GATT's basic legal principles remained much as they were in 1948, and several other meetings were held on further decreasing tariffs, among other relevant issues. For example, the Kennedy Round in the mid-sixties brought about a GATT Anti-Dumping Agreement. The Tokyo Round during the seventies was the first major attempt to tackle trade barriers that do not take the form of tariffs and to improve the system. The eighth meeting, the Uruguay Round of 1986–94, was the last and most extensive. It led to the creation of the WTO and a new set of agreements.

Essentially, the WTO is a mediator among member states facing trade problems with other member states. The GATT focuses on trade in goods, while the WTO deals with trade in services and intellectual property.

== Chronology of Afghanistan’s membership in WTO ==
The WTO was established in 1994, during which time Afghanistan was involved in a civil war and did not have a strong central government capable of joining the organization. With the emergence of the Taliban, Afghanistan's Mujahedeen government was not recognized and its representatives to the UN were not accepted. Additionally, economic sanctions were placed on Afghanistan at that time. Due to these circumstances, Afghanistan was not eligible for WTO membership. However, after the new regime was established under the leadership of Hamid Karzai, Afghanistan officially asked for membership to the WTO on November 21, 2004.

Following the official request from Afghanistan, WTO established a working party, consisting of 28 countries and led by the Netherlands, on December 13, 2004. These countries included China, Pakistan, Tajikistan, India, Japan, Russia, Saudi Arabia, and the European Union, among others; most had trade ties with Afghanistan.

Afghanistan presented its Trade Policy Memorandum on March 31, 2009, and the questions and replies were sent on July 26, 2010.

The working party held five meetings which took place on the following dates: 31 January 2011; 18 June 2012; 7 December 2012; 25 July 2013; and 11 November 2015.

Eventually, the Working Party presented its finalized report to WTO on 13 November 2015. Afghanistan received membership after Afghan First Deputy Chief Executive Mohammad Khan signed the protocol at the 10th WTO Ministerial Conference in Nairobi, Kenya on December 17, 2015.

== The policy of Afghanistan toward the WTO ==
Generally, Afghanistan's goal to become a member rested in the belief that Afghanistan would develop economically and would benefit from trade-related freedoms and privileges. It was also believed that its trade- and transit-related problems would dissolve and it would be able to attract foreign investment.

Afghanistan, in order to receive the membership in the WTO, brought about some internal reforms around trade, its economy, and investments. It signed 9 bilateral agreements related to goods and 7 others related to services.

The main aim of the WTO is to open borders for trade and reduce tariffs. Accordingly, Afghanistan has put an average of a 13.5% tariff on products, 33.6% on agricultural products, and 10.3% on non-agricultural products.

Afghanistan joined the Information Technology Agreement (ITA) upon accession into WTO. This agreement asks all participants to eliminate duties on IT products covered by the ITA. Afghanistan's export tariffs will also be bound for 243 tariff lines. Of these, 29.6% are bound at 10%, 24.2% are bound at 2.5%. On services, Afghanistan has made specific commitments in 11 services sectors, including 104 subsectors.

== Positive and negative impacts of Afghanistan’s membership in WTO ==
=== Advantages ===
Resolving Disputes: one of the aims behind establishing the WTO was to help member nations resolve their trade-related disputes.

Equal Treatment: Joining the WTO gives Afghan exports access to all WTO member markets on a Most Favored Nation (MFN) basis. This means that Afghan exports will be eligible for the best treatment that the country provides to the goods of other WTO members.

For example, if the European Union grants the United States a low tariff on its potatoes, then Afghan exports must be given the same low tariff on exports of Bamiyan potatoes to the European Union.

==== Free trade ====
The WTO aims to increase free trade in the world and remove obstacles toward it. Therefore, Afghanistan not only has access to the markets of 146 countries, but its exports would not face high tariffs in other countries.

==== Transit dispute settlement ====
Afghanistan is landlocked country which has caused difficulties in the area of trade. Joining the WTO provides Afghanistan a forum to resolve its transit-related problems via this organization. WTO rules will not force Pakistan to revise the Afghanistan–Pakistan Transit Trade Agreement to allow Afghanistan access to Indian markets.

=== Disadvantages ===
==== Threat to newly emerged industries ====
Governments in some countries that have recently started to become industrialized try to increase tariffs on importing goods in order for the domestic industries to survive in rivalry with foreign industries; however, Afghanistan, due to getting WTO membership, would not be able to increase tariffs on importing goods. Thus, newly emerged domestic industries could suffer in competition with foreign industries and could be defeated by imported goods. Some believe that this may lead to increased unemployment in the country.

==== Ending subsidy ====
The WTO emphasizes eliminating agricultural and industrial subsidies, which could have a deep impact on Afghanistan's agricultural and industrial exports. 228

==== Reduction in revenue ====
Afghanistan will not be able to put high tariffs on imports.
