= Shortepa District =

Shortepa شور تیپه
- District
- Location within Afghanistan
- Coordinates: 37°15′36″N 66°51′00″E
- Country: Afghanistan
- Province: Balkh
- Elevation: 274 m (899 ft)

Population (2012)
  - Total: 38,500

Shortepa also called Shor Tappeh (Dari: شور تیپه) (population 38,500) is one of the 15 districts of Balkh province. Shortepa, a small district in Balkh Province, Afghanistan. It is situated along the Amu Darya river, across the border with Termez, Uzbekistan, and to the east Kaldar. The main village is Shor Tappeh, A (37.3361°N 66.8200°E) at 274 m altitude.

== Economy ==
The vast majority of villagers work in agriculture on farms along the coast. In the village of Joi Wakil there is a clinic which serves the spars district.

== Demographics ==
According to the 2023 census, there are 44357 people residing in the seven villages. 19,800 or 51.5% of villagers were males and 18,700 or 48.5% were females. With a multi-ethnic and mostly Persian-speaking society. The major ethnic group is the Tajiks with the vast population belonging to them followed by Pashtoons, Uzbek, Hazaras, Turkman, Arab and Baluch. Shortepa also has a small but noticeable population of Kuchis or nomads whose numbers vary in different seasons with numbers going down in the winter and up in the summer.

== Villages ==
- Tash Guzar
- Hazareh Toghay
- Boria Baf
- Tokhom Geldi
- Arigh Batur
- Joi Wakli
- Chub Bash
