= 2025 Balkh earthquake =

Earthquake in Balkh Province, Afghanistan

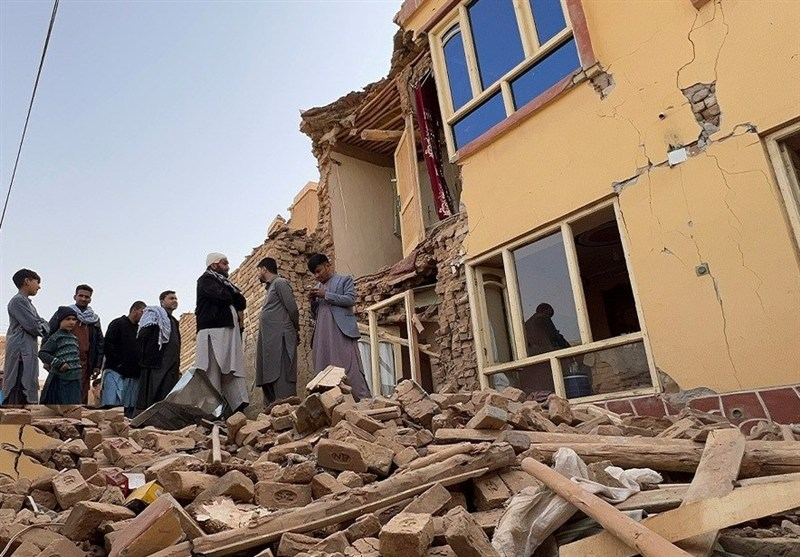
- Damage to homes in the district of Khulm in Samangan Province

- Location within Afghanistan
- UTC time: 2025-11-02 20:29:02
- ISC event: 644599023
- USGS-ANSS: ComCat
- Local date: 3 November 2025
- Local time: 00:59:02 AFT (UTC+4:30)
- Magnitude: M_{w} 6.2
- Depth: 28 km (17 mi)
- Epicenter: 36.589°N 67.484°E
- Areas affected: Balkh, Samangan, Badakhshan and Baghlan Provinces, Afghanistan
- Max. intensity: MMI VII (Very strong)
- Aftershocks: 5+
- Casualties: 31 deaths, 1,172 injuries

On 3 November 2025, at 00:59 AFT (20:29 UTC, 2 November), an earthquake with a magnitude of 6.2 on the moment magnitude scale (M_{w}) struck northern Afghanistan. Around 31 people were killed, 1,172 were injured and many homes collapsed in Balkh and Samangan Provinces.

== Tectonic setting ==
Much of Afghanistan is situated in a broad zone of continental deformation within the Eurasian Plate. Seismic activity in Afghanistan is influenced by the subduction of the Arabian Plate to the west and the oblique subduction of the Indian Plate in the east. The subduction rate of the Indian Plate along the continental convergent boundary is estimated to be 39 mm/yr or higher. Transpression due to the plates interacting is associated with high seismicity within the shallow crust. Seismicity is detectable to a depth of 300 km (190 mi) beneath Afghanistan due to plate subduction. These earthquakes beneath the Hindu Kush are the result of movement on faults accommodating detachment of the subducted crust. Within the shallow crust, the Chaman Fault represents a major transform fault associated with large shallow earthquakes that forms the transpressional boundary between the Eurasian and Indian Plates. This zone consists of seismically active thrust and strike-slip faults that have accommodated crustal deformation since the beginning of the formation of the Himalayan orogeny. The Northern Afghanistan Platform has one prominent active fault zone, the 220 km long west-east trending Alburz–Mormul fault that runs to the south of Mazar-e Sharif and is formed of thrust faults.

== Earthquake ==
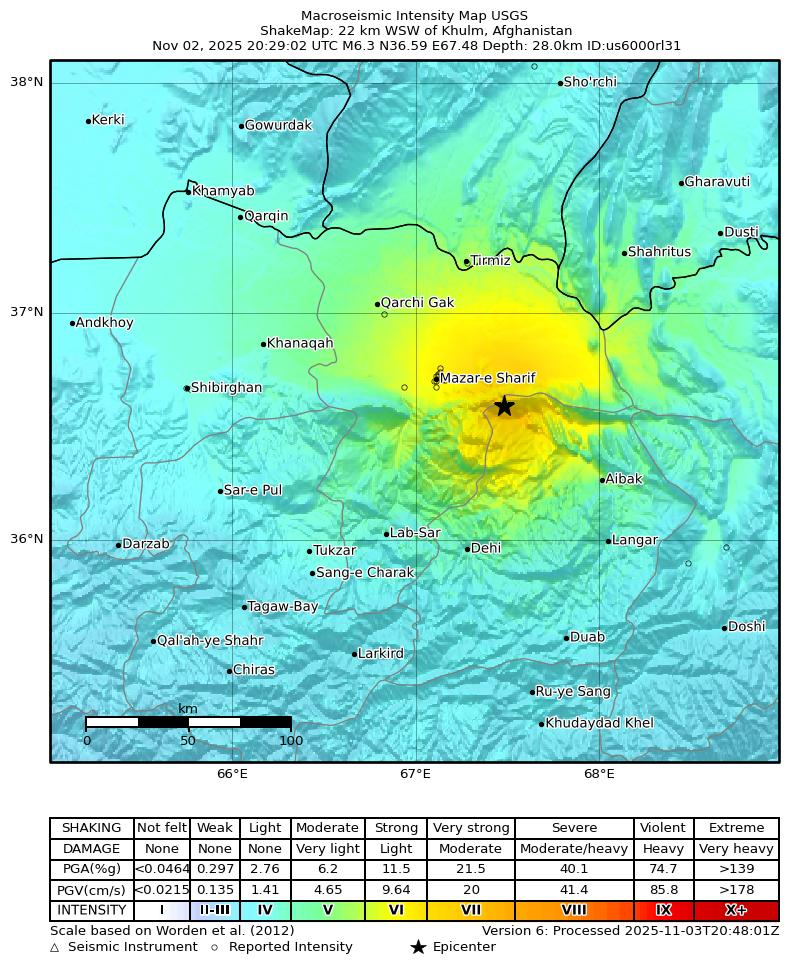
USGS Shakemap

The earthquake had a moment magnitude (M_{ww}) of 6.2, according to the United States Geological Survey (USGS), while Uzbekistan's Ministry of Emergency Situations reported a magnitude of 6.8. Its epicenter was located in Nahri Shahi District, Balkh Province, near the border with Samangan Province, with a hypocenter 28 km (17 mi) beneath the surface. It had a maximum Modified Mercalli intensity of VII (Very strong). According to the USGS' Prompt Assessment of Global Earthquakes for Response service, approximately 80,000 people were within the zone of intensity VII, and 1.49 million people were exposed to VI (Strong) shaking. The MMI of the earthquake was estimated to have reached VII in Kholm, VI in Mazar-i-Sharif and Balkh, and V (Moderate) in Termez, Uzbekistan, the districts of Nosiri Khusrav and Shahritus in Tajikistan, and Köýtendag District, Turkmenistan. Tremors were also felt in Mashhad, Iran, Islamabad, Pakistan, and areas along the India–Pakistan border. The shaking was estimated to have lasted for around 20 seconds.

== Impact ==
The earthquake resulted in at least 31 fatalities, 1,172 injuries, 305 homes destroyed and 1,004 others damaged. There were 12 deaths and 616 injuries in Balkh Province while 11 died and 329 were injured in Samangan Province. In Balkh Province, all districts reported structural damage. Four fatalities and many injuries were reported in Sholgara District. In Mazar-i-Sharif, dozens of people were injured by mass panic, broken windows and collapsing walls, many of them seriously, and at least one house was badly damaged. In a nearby village, many homes and walls reportedly collapsed. The Mausoleum of Imam Ali and the Bagh-e Jehan Nama Palace in Baghlan were damaged.

In Samangan Province, a landslide buried a section of Asian Highway 7 in Khulm District, killing 10 people and injuring 43 others. More than 200 houses in the district were destroyed while more than 1,000 others were damaged. One death also occurred in each of Aybak and Hazrati Sultan District. The laboratory of Samangan Provincial Hospital collapsed, destroying critical medical equipment. At least two other medical facilities were also damaged. Power lines connecting Afghanistan with Tajikistan and Uzbekistan were damaged, causing outages in nine provinces of Afghanistan including Kabul. About 800 homes were partially destroyed in Badakhshan Province, with the worst damage occurring in the Chogani area. Over 500 homes were damaged or destroyed in other parts of the country. Some damage was reported in Faryab, Sar-e-Pol, Jowzjan and Baghlan Provinces.

== Aftermath ==
The United Nations Assistance Mission in Afghanistan (UNAMA), the European Union Delegation to Afghanistan, the Norwegian Refugee Council, the World Health Organization and the Bayat Foundation deployed emergency teams and humanitarian aid to the affected areas. The UN warned that only one-third of its $2.4 billion Humanitarian Response Plan for Afghanistan had been funded so far. The Afghan defence ministry deployed the 209 Al-Fatah Corps to conduct rescue and relief operations. The United Arab Emirates sent six shipments of relief supplies to help people affected by the earthquake.

== See also ==
- List of earthquakes in 2025
- List of earthquakes in Afghanistan
- 2025 Kunar earthquake
