= Char Bulak =

- Location in Afghanistan
- Coordinates: 36°46′2″N 66°42′19″E
- Country: Afghanistan
- Province: Balkh Province
- District: Chahar Bolak District
- Time zone: + 4.30

Char Bulak or Chahar Bolak is a town and seat of Chahar Bolak District in Balkh Province in northern Afghanistan.

== See also ==
- Balkh Province
