= Kaldar District =

Kaldar کلدار
- District
- Location within Afghanistan
- Coordinates: 37°07′48″N 67°33′00″E
- Country: Afghanistan
- Province: Balkh
- Center: Hairatan
- Elevation: 300 m (980 ft)

Population (2025)
  - Total: 24,615
- Time zone: UTC+04:30 (Afghanistan Time)

Kaldar (Dari/Pashto: کلدار) is one of the districts of Balkh Province in northern Afghanistan. It sits along the Amu River and has an estimated population of 24,615 people. Hairatan serves as the district's administrative center.

The Afghanistan–Uzbekistan border is the northern boundary of Kaldar District and the Afghanistan–Tajikistan border is its northeastern boundary. Khulm District is to the south, Nahri Shahi District to the southwest, and Shortepa District to the west. The Qosh Tepa Canal flows in Kaldar from east to west. There is a road and a rail track running between Hairatan in the north and the Afghanistan Ring Road in the south.
