= Sholgara =

Village in Balkh Province, Afghanistan

Sholgara is a village in Sholgara District, Balkh Province, in northern Afghanistan. It is located south of Mazar-i-Sharif. It is known for agricultural sector. Pashtuns are the primary ethnic group in the district followed by Arabs, Tajiks, and Hazaras. It is equivalent to a county seat.

== See also ==
- Balkh Province
