= Tal-e ʽAsheqan =

- Location in Afghanistan
- Coordinates: 35°36′54″N 66°51′28″E
- Country: Afghanistan
- Province: Balkh Province
- Time zone: + 4.30

Tal-e ʽAsheqan is a village in Balkh Province in northern Afghanistan.

== See also ==
- Balkh Province
