= Chemtal =

- Location in Afghanistan
- Coordinates: 36°40′39″N 66°48′21″E
- Country: Afghanistan
- Province: Balkh Province
- District: Chimtal District
- Time zone: + 4.30

Chemtal or Chimtal is a town and seat of Chimtal District in Balkh Province in northern Afghanistan.

== See also ==
- Balkh Province
