= Chub Bash =

- Location in Afghanistan
- Coordinates: 37°20′48″N 66°54′23″E
- Country: Afghanistan
- Province: Balkh Province
- Time zone: + 4.30

Chub Bash is a village in Balkh Province in northern Afghanistan.

It lies on the border with Uzbekistan.

== See also ==
- Balkh Province
