= Arigh Batur =

Aregh Batur
- Location in Afghanistan
- Coordinates: 37°20′55″N 66°57′42″E
- Country: Afghanistan
- Province: Balkh Province
- Time zone: + 4.30

Aregh Batur is a farming village in Balkh Province in northern Afghanistan. Situated on the Amu Darya river next to Joi Wakli.

== See also ==
- Balkh Province
