= Zari District =

Zari زاری
- District
- Location within Afghanistan
- Coordinates: 35°51′00″N 66°43′48″E
- Country: Afghanistan
- Province: Balkh

Area
  - Total: 846 km^{2} (327 sq mi)
- Elevation: 900 m (3,000 ft)

Population (2012)
  - Total: 42,600

Zari (Pashto/Dari: زاری) is a district in Balkh province, Afghanistan. It was created in 2005 from part of Kishindih district.

District profile:

- 104 villages
- Schools: 14 primary, 4 secondary, 4 high schools
- Health: 2 basic, 1 comprehensive, 33 posts

== History ==
On 1 May 2020, the Taliban attacked Zari District overnight, killing 13 members of the Afghan security forces and injuring 17 others.
