= Balkh District =

District in Balkh, Afghanistan

Coordinates: 36.7883°N 66.8827°E

Balkh District ولسوالی بلخ / د بلخ ولسوالۍ
- District
- Location within Afghanistan
- Country: Afghanistan
- Province: Balkh
- Center: Balkh

Population
  - Estimate (2025): 148,972
- Time zone: UTC+04:30 (Afghanistan Time)

Balkh District (Dari: ولسوالی بلخ; Pashto: د بلخ ولسوالۍ) is one of the districts of Balkh Province in northern Afghanistan. The city of Balkh serves as its administrative center, which has an estimated population of 148,972 people.

== See also ==
- Districts of Afghanistan
