= Hazareh Toghay =

- Location in Afghanistan
- Coordinates: 37°13′26″N 67°12′33″E
- Country: Afghanistan
- Province: Balkh Province
- Time zone: + 4.30

Hazareh Toghay is a village in Balkh Province in northern Afghanistan.

== See also ==
- Balkh Province
