= Tokhom Geldi =

- Location in Afghanistan
- Coordinates: 37°19′52″N 67°5′22″E
- Country: Afghanistan
- Province: Balkh Province
- Time zone: + 4.30

Tokhom Geldi is a village in Balkh Province in northern Afghanistan.

== See also ==
- Balkh Province
