= Qosh Tepa Canal =

Water transmission project in Afghanistan

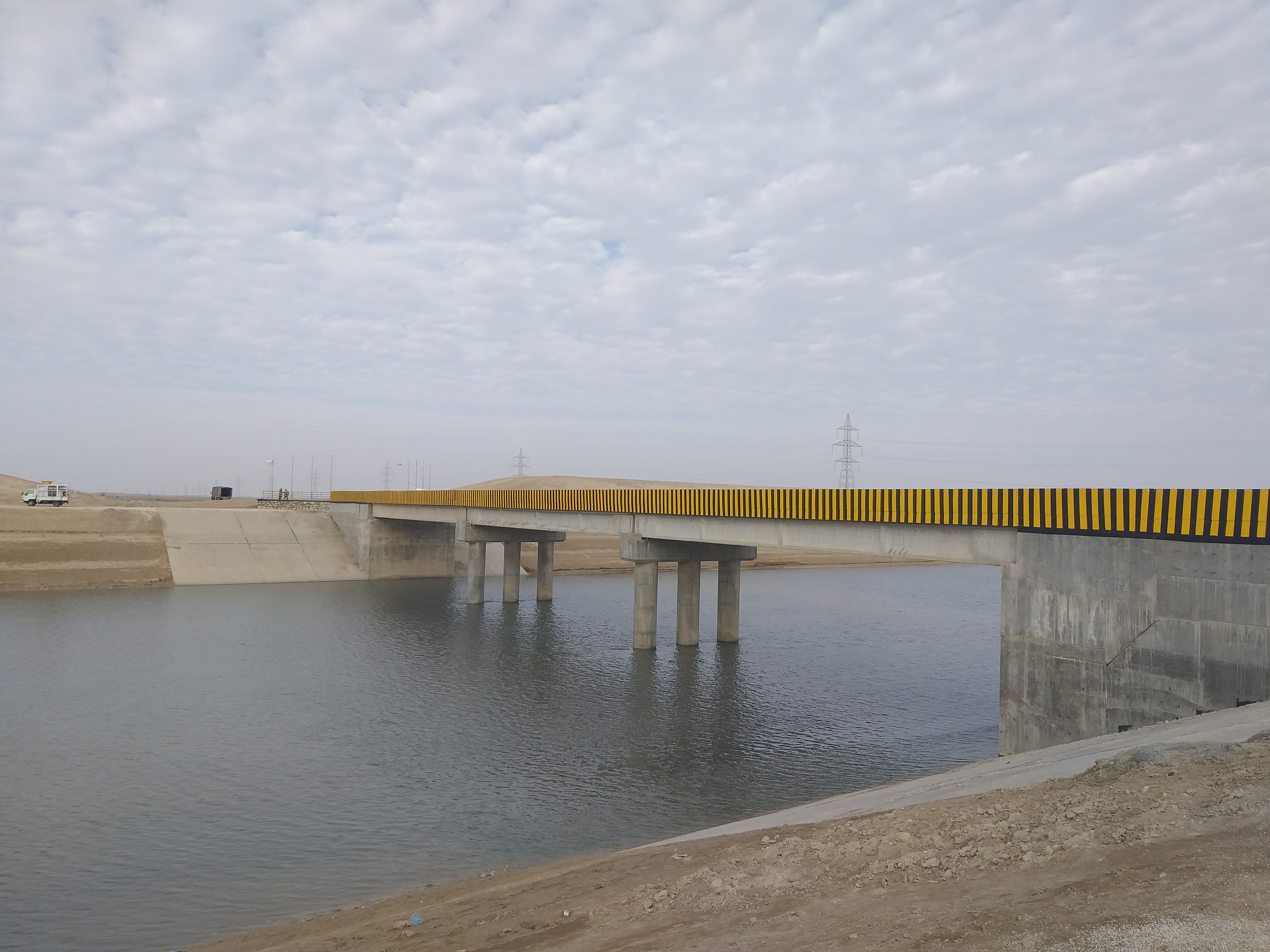
- A bridge over the Qosh Tepa Canal in Balkh Province, Afghanistan
- Interactive map of Qosh Tepa Canal

Specifications
- Length: 285 km (177 miles)
- Status: Under construction

History
- Original owner: Afghanistan
- Construction began: 2022

Geography
- Start point: Kaldar District, Balkh Province
- End point: Andkhoy District, Faryab Province
- Beginning coordinates: 37.084797°N 67.773767°E
- Branch of: Amu Darya

The Qosh Tepa Canal (Persian: کانال قوش تپه; Pashto: د قوشتېپې کانال; Uzbek: Qoʻshtepa kanali; Southern Uzbek: قۉشتېپه کانالی) is a canal being built in northern Afghanistan to divert water from the Amu Darya. The main canal is expected to be 285 km long and the overall initiative seeks to convert 550,000 hectares of desert into farmland. The Qosh Tepa Canal starts in the Kaldar District of Balkh Province, then proceeds through Jowzjan Province and finally comes to an end in the Andkhoy District of Faryab Province.

The Taliban-run government of Afghanistan has made the canal a priority project and the construction began in early 2022. Images supplied by Planet Labs showed that from April 2022 to February 2023 more than 100 km of the canal had been excavated. The first phase of the project was completed in October 2023, with the second phase immediately commencing, by December 2024 the second phase was ninety percent completed. The entire project is expected to be completed in late 2026.

Independent experts and engineers have expressed skepticism and concern about the project, stating that the Afghan government does not possess the know-how to effectively complete the canal. In particular, they have noted that there is a lack of oversight with "rudimentary" construction methods being employed. In December 2023, it was reported that the canal had experienced a major breach, with satellite images showing a large body of water forming near the place where the embankment had collapsed.

== Name ==
According to some sources, the canal is named after Qosh Tepa District in Afghanistan's Jowzjan Province. The word "qosh" (Uzbek: qoʻsh) is a Turkic word meaning "a pair" or a "twin". "Qoʻshtepa" means "twin" or "adjoining hills" and is a common Uzbek toponym. Therefore, the canal's name translates to "Twin Hills Canal". In a few sources, the canal is mistakenly referred to as the "Qush Tepa Canal", which means "Bird Hills Canal".

== Water use regime on the Amu River ==
A formal regime to divide the Amu's waters among the four ex-USSR republics of Kyrgyzstan, Tajikistan, Turkmenistan and Uzbekistan was made during the Soviet period. Being internal to the USSR, these agreements did not reflect Afghanistan's interests. When construction of the canal began in 2022, Afghanistan was still not a party to any regional or international treaty on using transboundary river waters. As such, no pre-arranged dispute resolution procedures were in place to address the other Amu River basin countries concerns. The Afghan government argued that Afghanistan has a generic right to use the waters of Amu River, irrespective of a formal agreement being in place.

== International reaction ==
Uzbekistan, the main down-river country potentially affected, has expressed concern that the canal will have an adverse effect on its agriculture.

== Environmental concerns ==
Environmental experts have raised concern that the Qosh Tepa Canal will make the Aral Sea situation worse by diverting even more water from Amu River. A detailed analysis of the project by the independent CABAR.asia analytical publication found that construction methods employed appeared "rudimentary" and concluded the likelihood of water losses in the canal was high.

== 2023 breach reports ==
In December 2023, it was reported that the Qosh Tepa Canal had experienced a major breach, with satellite imagery obtained from Sentinel-2 showing a large body of water stretching for nine kilometers on the northern bank of the canal. The body of water was reported to increase further during the subsequent days. Afghan officials denied the reports, claiming the waters of the canal were temporarily redirected to a nearby area in a deliberate move.
