= Balkhab copper mine =

Balkhab Copper Mine
- Location within Afghanistan

Location
- Location: Balkhab District, Sar-e Pol Province, Afghanistan; 35°35′N 66°46′E

Production
- Type: Copper

The Balkhab Copper Mine is located in the Sar-e-Pul and Balkh Provinces in north central Afghanistan, approximately 130 km south-west of Mazar-i-Sharif, the capital of Balkh province. There is evidence of mineral extraction activities at Balkhab going back almost 3,000 years, likely to have been continuous mining of copper via surface and underground workings.

The copper mine is of Volcanogenic massive sulfide ore deposit (VMS), modern exploration was conducted during 1966-1972, consisting of mapping, trench and surface grab sampling and analysis. Recent work on the Balkhab copper prospect was initiated by the Afghan Geological Survey, at the request of villagers in the region. A reconnaissance sampling mission was carried out in 2008 by the Ministry of Mines. The Balkhab copper deposit could be as high as 150 million tonnes.

Road access to the site is from Mazar-i-Sharif, and the area has the potential to benefit from the proposed rail link connecting Afghanistan to Pakistan. The Chaman-Kandahar-Logar province line is proposed to pass just east of the project area with a station planned at near-by town Ghazni. The closest power source identified is at Mazar-i-Sharif which is connected to the North East Power System main isolated grid. The main water source for the project is the significant stream, Rode Balkhab, which splits the licence area.

The Government of Afghanistan, through the Ministry of Mines, announced the opening of tender processes for the exploration and subsequent exploitation of the mine on 6 December 2011. The tender process for the Project is expected to culminate in the granting of a mining agreement with associated exploration licence(s) and, subject to the satisfaction of certain conditions, will lead to the granting of the requisite exploitation licence(s). Canaccord Genuity, SRK Consulting and Mayer Brown are acting as transaction advisers to the Ministry in relation to the tenders for the Projects. The deadline for submission of bids for the Balkhab mineral tender was 23 July 2012.

To ensure transparency and fair and open competition, bids for the mine were opened publicly by junior ministerial officers with bid-company representatives in attendance. The council’s evaluation of bids for Balkhab, were observed by transaction advisors and third party transparency advisers. On 26 November 2012, preferred bidders were selected to undertake the exploration and subsequent exploitation of the current mineral tenders. The selection of the preferred bidder for Balkhab follows an extensive process since launch in December 2011, An announcement of the winner for the mine was announce on 31 December 2012 with Preferred bidders and reserve bidders were selected for the mineral tender. The preferred bidder for the mine was investment group Centar and its operating company, Afghan Gold and Minerals Company (AGMC), and the reserve bidder was Silk Road Mining. The companies hoped to have a pilot plant operational by the end of 2014 or 2015. On October 5, 2018 in Washington, D.C., Afghan officials signed a 30 year contract involving $56 million investment by Centar and AGMC for exploration of an area covering 500 square km, with development of mining due to begin thereafter.
