= Chimtal District =

Chimtal چمتال
- District
- Location within Afghanistan
- Coordinates: 36°31′12″N 66°36′00″E
- Country: Afghanistan
- Province: Balkh Province
- Capital: Chemtal

Population (2004)
  - Total: 81,311

Chimtal District also Chemtal or Chamtal (Dari: چمتال) is a district located in the western part of Balkh province, Afghanistan. The estimated population of Chimtal in 2004 was around 81,311, with Hazaras being predominant. The capital is Chimtal.
