= Charbolak District =

Charbolak چاربولک
- District
- Location within Afghanistan
- Coordinates: 36°46′23″N 66°52′25″E
- Country: Afghanistan
- Province: Balkh
- Elevation: 300 m (980 ft)

Population (2009)
  - Total: 66,300

Chārbōlak (or Chahar Bolak or Char Bolak) (Pashto: چاربولک) district (pop: 66,300) is located in the western part of Balkh Province. Its capital is the village of Charbolak, 40 km northwest of Mazari Sharif. Most of the population is Pashtun.

The previous name of this district was Adina Masjid (آدینه‌ مسجد), which was changed to Charbolak by Mohammad Gul Khan Momand.
