= Khulm District =

Khulm خُلم
- District
- Location within Afghanistan
- Coordinates: 36°48′36″N 67°44′24″E
- Country: Afghanistan
- Province: Balkh
- Capital: Kholm

Area
  - Total: 3,043 km^{2} (1,175 sq mi)
- Elevation: 450 m (1,480 ft)

Population (2012)
  - Total: 68,900

Khulm or Khulmi (Dari: خُلم) (see Kholm, Afghanistan) is a district of Balkh province, Afghanistan. Its capital lies at Kholm. In 2019 the estimated population was 81,234.

District profile:

- Villages: 91
- Education: 7 primary, 13 secondary, 7 high schools
- Health centers: 2 basic, 2 comprehensive
