= Nahri Shahi District =

Nahri Shahi نهر شاهی
- District
- Location within Afghanistan
- Coordinates: 36°50′24″N 67°10′48″E
- Country: Afghanistan
- Province: Balkh
- Capital: Mazar-i-Sharif
- Elevation: 300 m (980 ft)

Population (2019)
  - Total: 551,846

Nahri Shahi or Nahr-e-Shahi (Dari: نهر شاهی) is a large district of Balkh province, Afghanistan around the capital district Mazari Sharif.
