= Sholgara District =

Sholgara شولگره بوینه‌قره
- District
- Location within Afghanistan
- Coordinates: 36°18′00″N 66°51′36″E
- Country: Afghanistan
- Province: Balkh
- Elevation: 550 m (1,800 ft)

Population (2012)
  - Total: 110,600

Sholgara (Dari: شولگره, šol(a)-gara, lit. "rice paddy field", old name Boyena Qara, Dari: بوینه‌قره) is a district (pop: 110,600) in the southern part of Balkh Province, Afghanistan. Sholgara, just south of Mazari Sharif (Mazar), is strategically located at the crossroads between several districts: Sangcharak, Kishindih, Dar-I-Suf. Dar-I-Suf and Sangcharak are known for their resistance to the Taliban insurgency. It is commonly said that "who holds Sholgara, holds Mazar".

== Economy ==
The demography is not clear as no census has taken place yet.

The economy is almost entirely agricultural. The Sholgar River irrigates some 40,000 jeribs (8,000 hectares) of land, and another two or three thousand are irrigated from springs. Although rainfall is low (120 mm to 200 mm a year), 150,000 jeribs (30,000 hectares) are in dry farming, mostly wheat and some barley. Only 5% of the agriculture is in orchards.

Nonetheless, Sholgara District, along with Balkh District, are the sole producers of industrial products in Balkh Province. In addition karakul skins are processed in Sholgara District.
