= Balkh Province =

Province of Afghanistan

Balkh بلخ
- Province
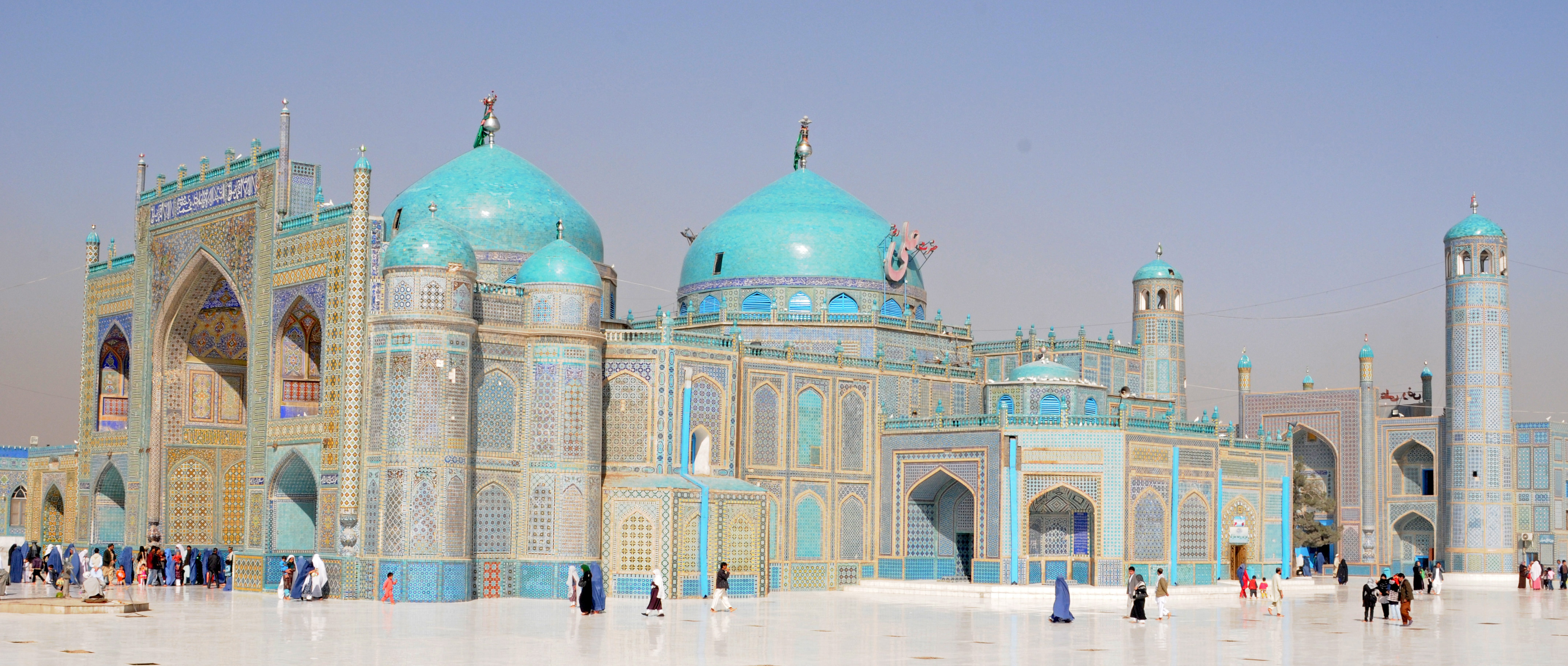
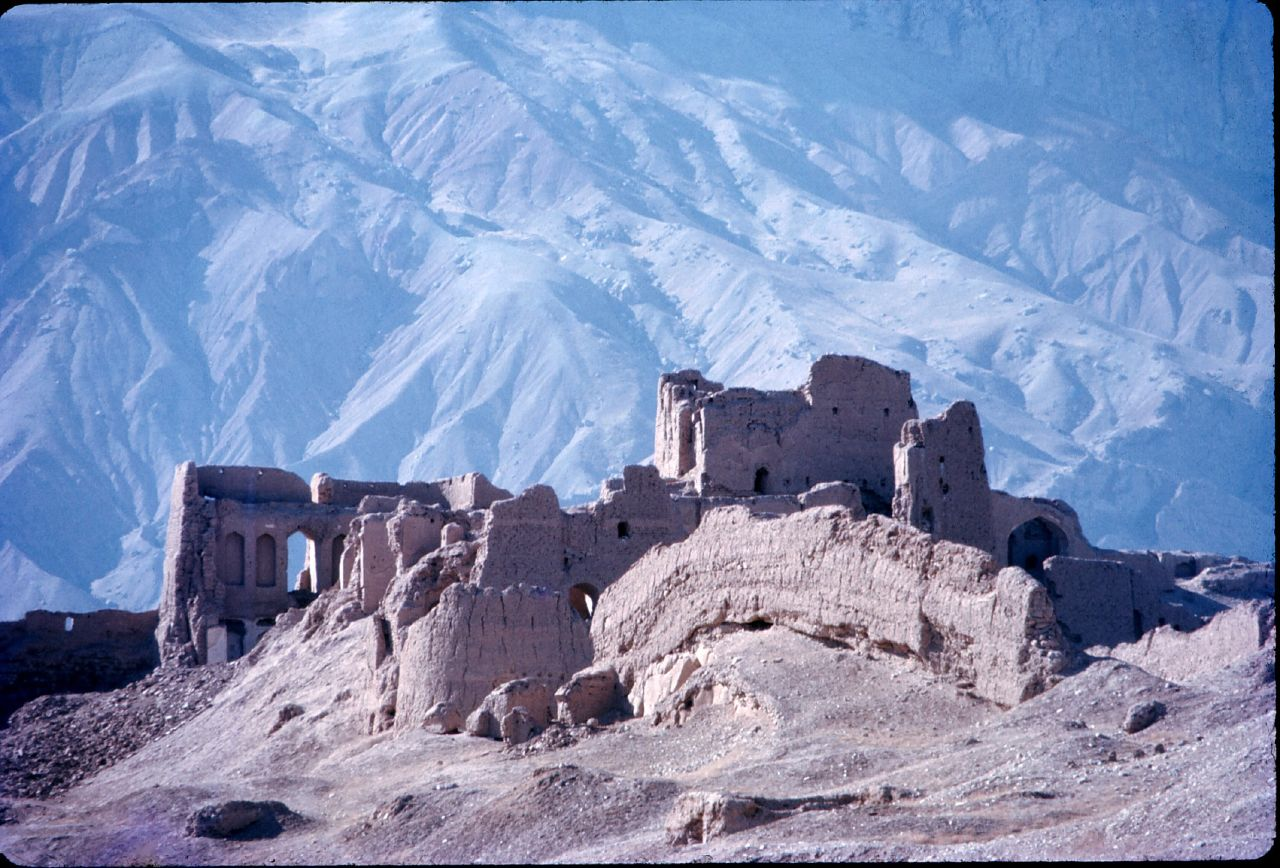
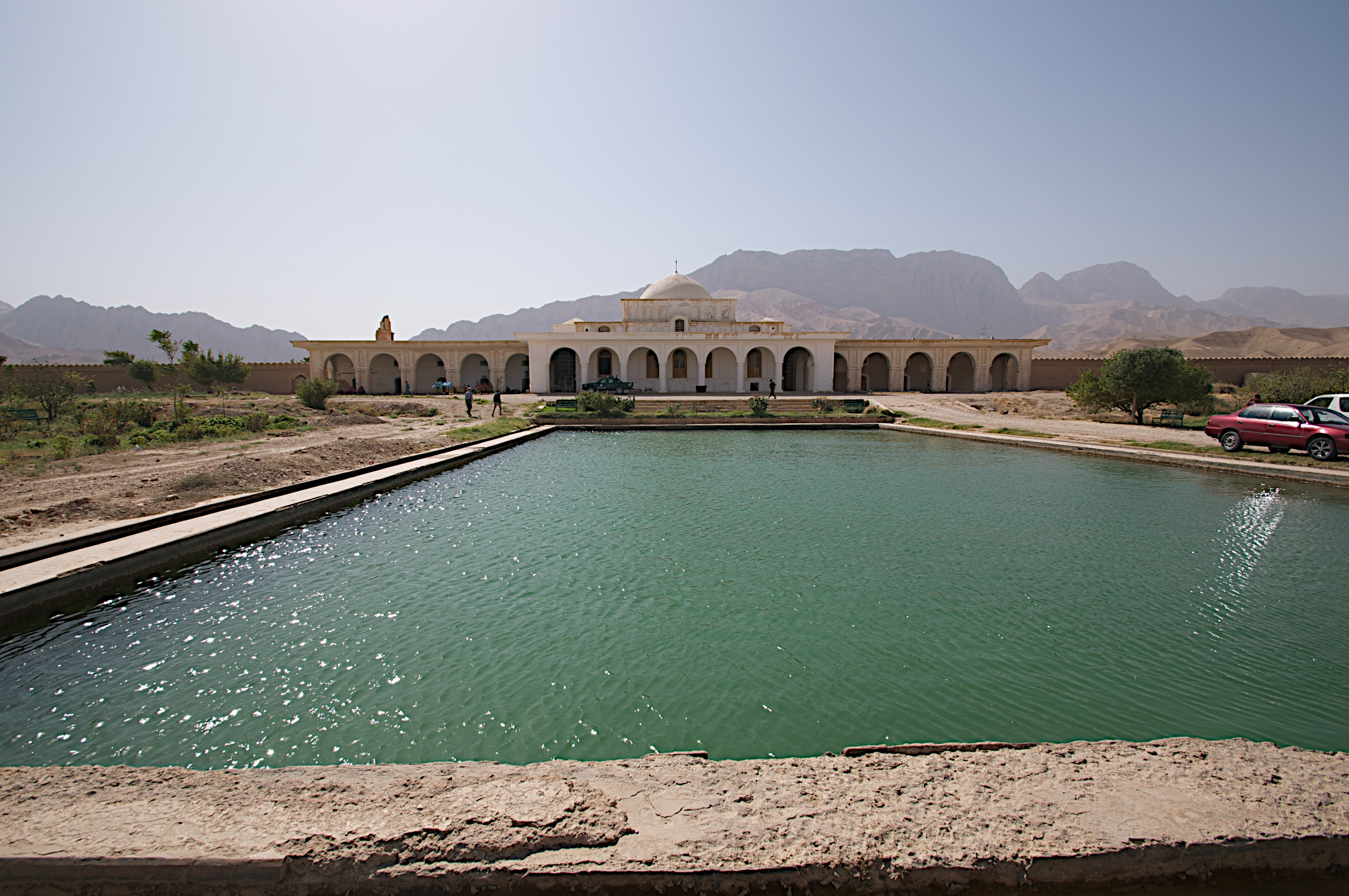
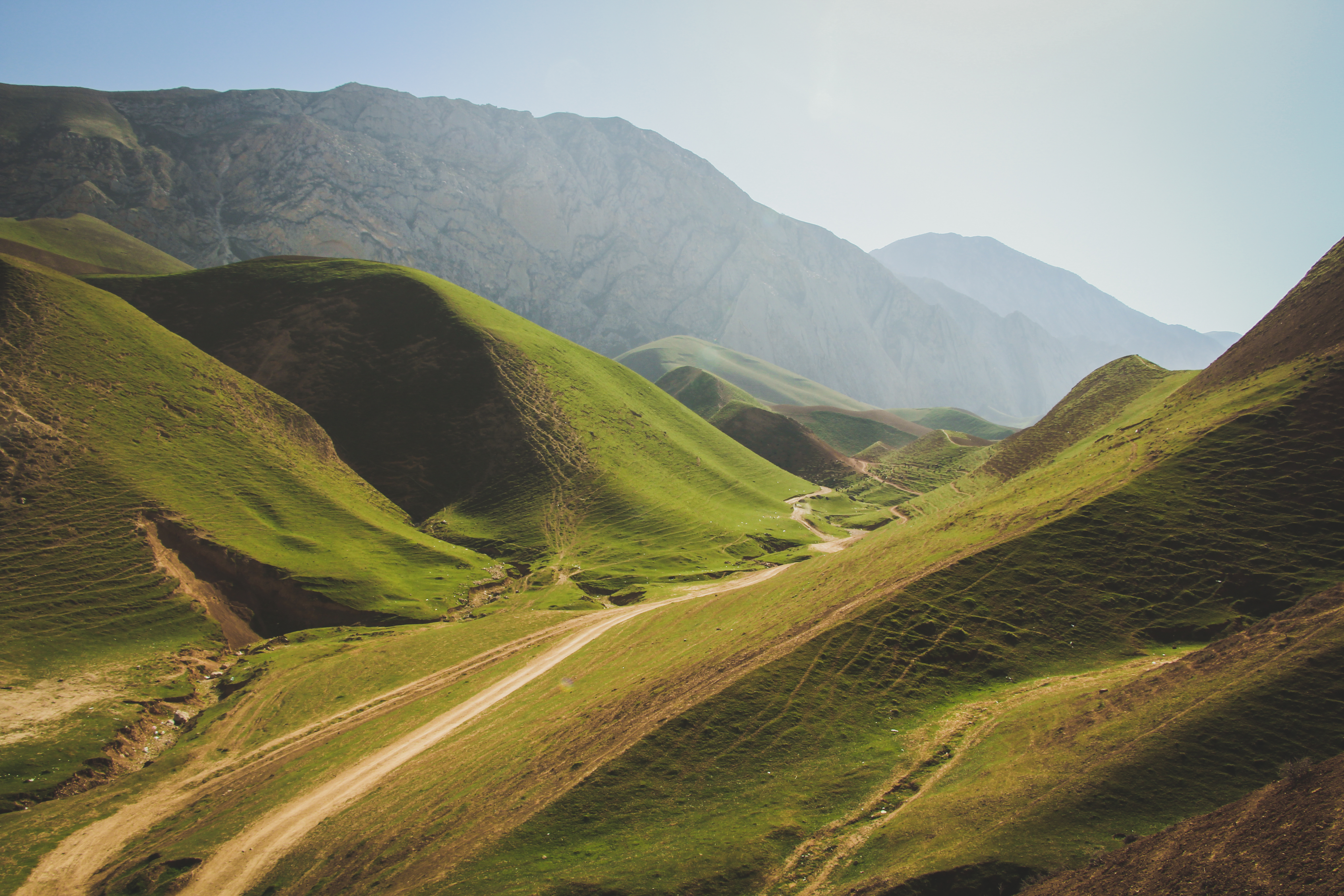
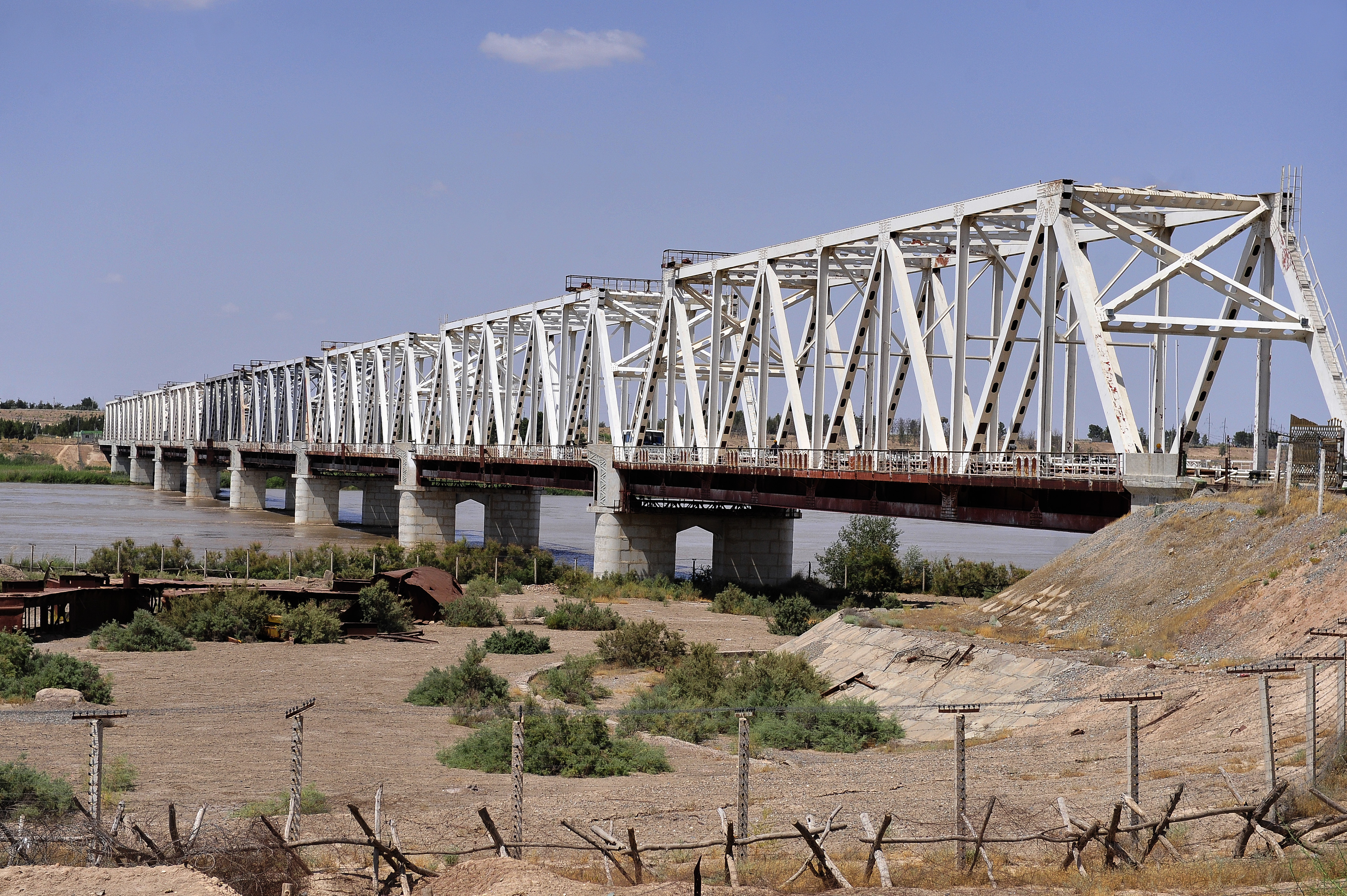
- From the top, Blue Mosque, Kholm Fortress, Tashkurgan Palace, Sholgara District, Afghanistan–Uzbekistan Friendship Bridge

- Map of Afghanistan with Balkh highlighted
- Coordinates: 36°45′N 67°0′E
- Country: Afghanistan
- Capital: Mazar-i-Sharif

Government
  - Governor: Haji Muhammad Yousuf Wafa

Area
  - Total: 16,186.3 km^{2} (6,249.6 sq mi)

Population (2023)
  - Total: c. 1.6 million
  - Density: 98.9/km^{2} (256/sq mi)
- Demonym: Balkhi
- Time zone: UTC+4:30 (Afghanistan Time)
- Postal code: 17xx
- ISO 3166 code: AF-BAL
- Main languages: Dari, Pashto, Turkmen and Uzbek

Balkh (Note: Pashto: Pashto pronunciation: [zɑˈbəl]: بلخ Dari: Dari pronunciation: [zɑː.bʊ́l]: بلخ) is one of the northern provinces of Afghanistan and is widely regarded as one of the country's most historically significant and culturally rich regions. It borders Jowzjan and Sar-e-Pol to the west, Samangan to the south, Kunduz to the east, and the Surxondaryo Region of Uzbekistan to the north. The provincial capital is Mazar-i-Sharif, which functions as the main administrative, economic, and cultural center of the province.

Covering an area of approximately 16,000 square kilometers and having an estimated population of about 1.6 million people (as of 2023), Balkh is defined by its fertile plains in the Kunduz River basin and its proximity to the northern Afghan steppe, which contrasts with the mountainous regions further south. The province contains numerous archaeological sites and ancient cities, including the historic city of Balkh, which was a major center of trade, religion, and learning in antiquity, often referred to as the "mother of cities".

Historically, Balkh has served as a critical crossroads connecting Central Asia, South Asia, and the Iranian world. It was a prominent center of the Bactrian civilization, Ariana, and Greater Khorasan, later becoming an important hub for Buddhism, Zoroastrianism, and Islamic scholarship. The province is internationally recognized for its role in trade and cultural exchange along ancient routes that later became part of the Silk Road.

Today, Balkh combines strategic economic importance, cultural heritage, and agricultural productivity, while also facing challenges related to infrastructure development, governance, and security. Despite these difficulties, the province retains a strong regional identity, rooted in its historical significance, fertile land, and enduring cultural legacy.

== Etymology ==
The name Balkh is believed to have ancient origins, tracing back to Old Persian: 𐎲𐎠𐎧𐎫𐎼𐎡𐏁, romanized: Bāxtriš, meaning "Bactria". This term was rendered in Sogdian: 𐫁𐫆𐫓, romanized: bẖl /Baxl/.

== History ==
=== Antiquity ===
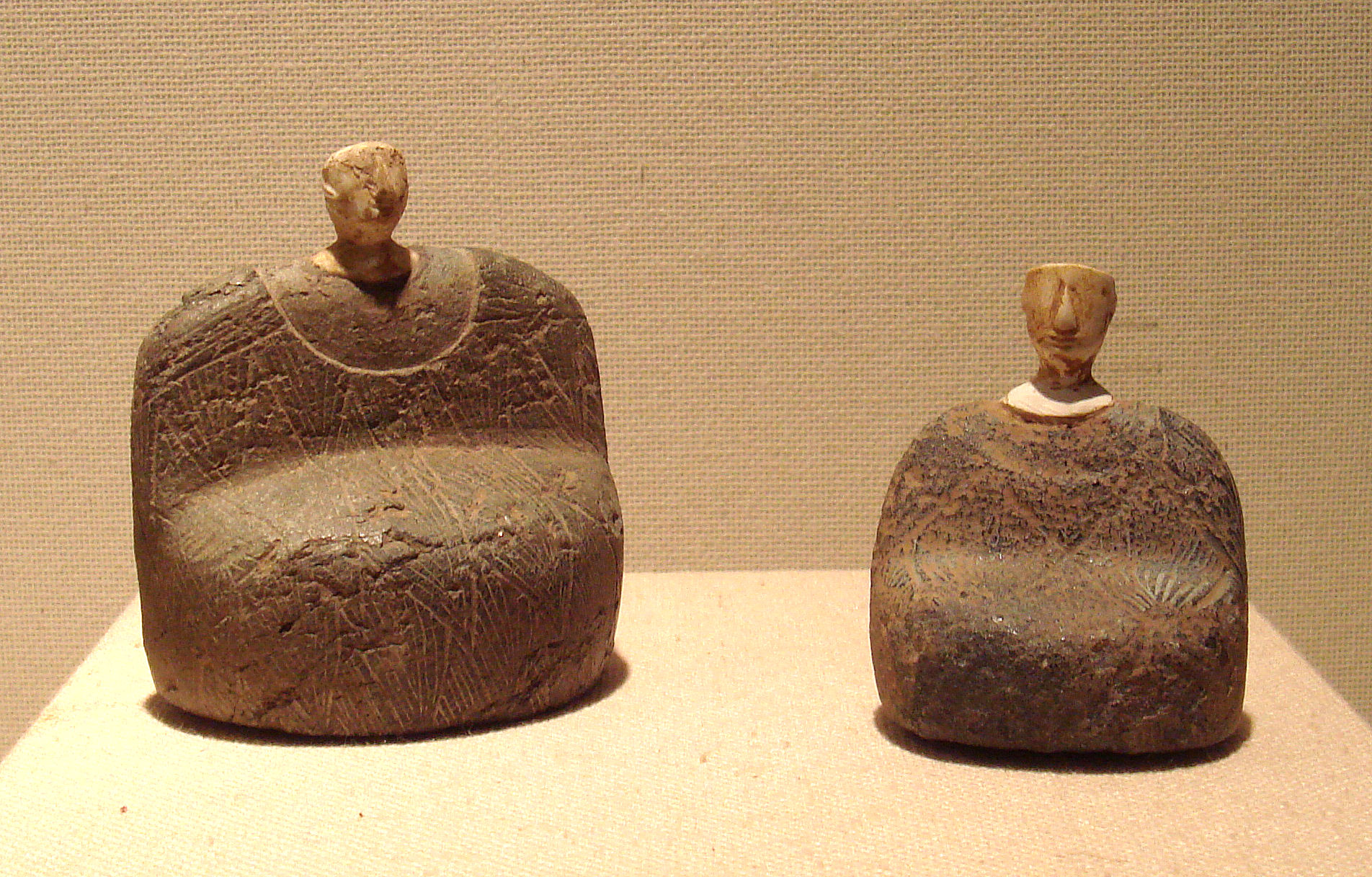
Goddesses, Bactria, Afghanistan, 2000–1800 BCE

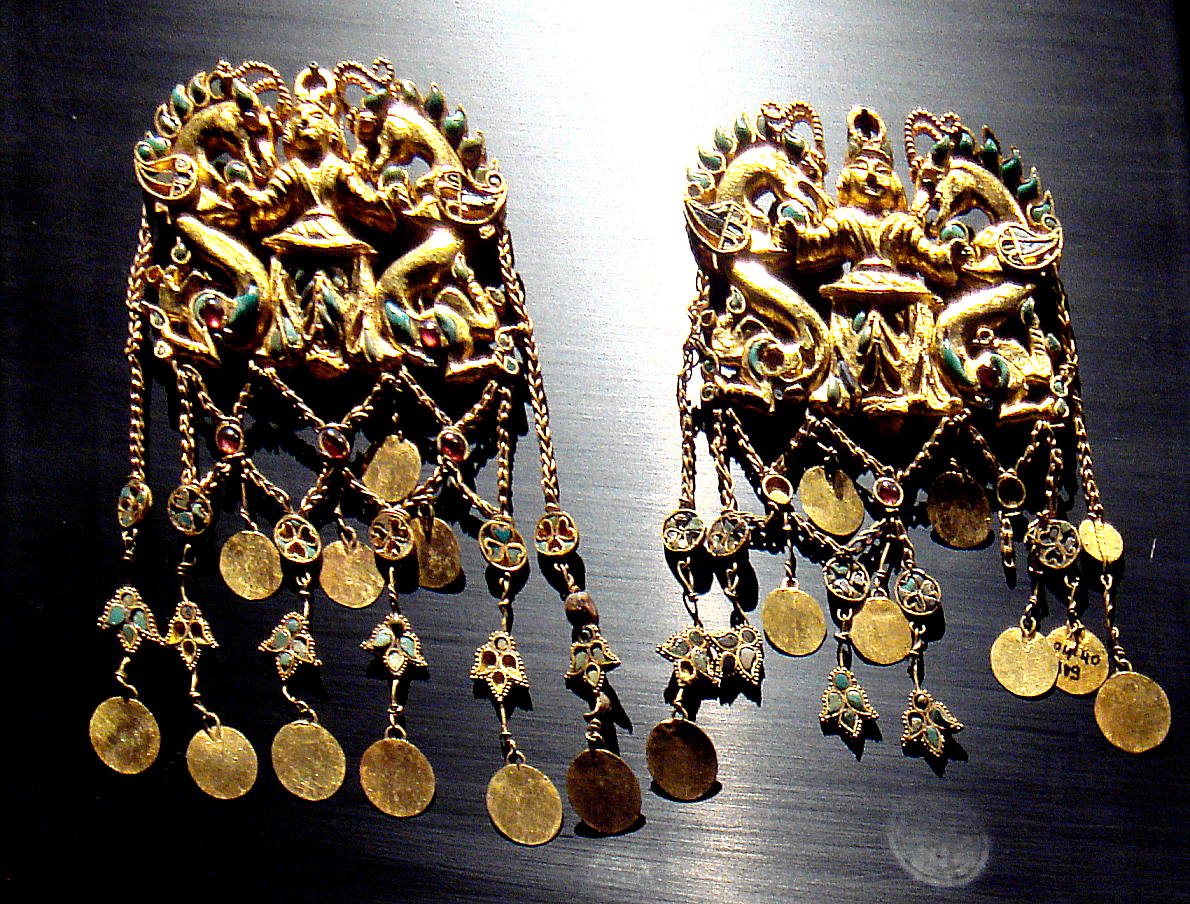
The treasure of the royal burial Tillia tepe is attributed to 1st century BCE Sakas in Bactria.

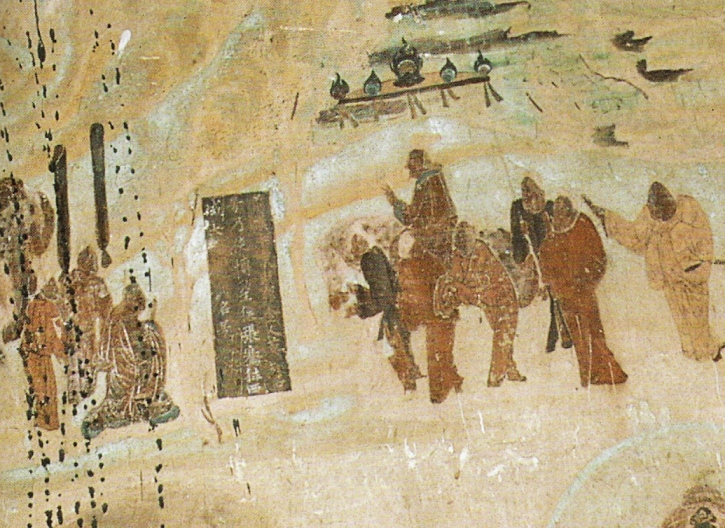
Zhang Qian taking leave from emperor Han Wudi, for his expedition to Central Asia from 138 to 126 BCE, Mogao Caves mural, 618–712 CE.

The territory of modern Balkh corresponds to the core of ancient Bactria, one of the earliest urban centers in Central Asia. From the early Bronze Age, the region formed part of the Bactria–Margiana Archaeological Complex (BMAC), dated to approximately 2200–1700 BCE, characterized by fortified settlements, metallurgy, trade, and complex religious structures. Classical Greek authors identified the region as Bactria based on the city of Balkh. The area is associated with early Iranian migrations and the early development of Zoroastrianism. The Avestan language reflects this early eastern Iranian cultural sphere.

By the 6th century BCE, Bactria became an important satrapy of the Achaemenid Empire. After the defeat of Darius III by Alexander the Great, the region was incorporated into the Macedonian Empire following prolonged resistance in Bactria and Sogdiana. After Alexander's death, Bactria passed to the Seleucid Empire. Around 255 BCE, Diodotus I founded the independent Greco-Bactrian Kingdom, which expanded into northern India and became one of the most powerful Hellenistic states. Greek served as the administrative language, while Bactrian adopted the Greek script.

By the late 2nd century BCE, the kingdom collapsed under invasions by the Sakas and Yuezhi. When the Chinese envoy Zhang Qian visited around 127 BCE, Bactria, known as Daxia, was wealthy but politically weakened. His reports contributed to the opening of the Silk Road. In the early 1st century CE, Kujula Kadphises founded the Kushan Empire, under which Balkh became a major center of trade and Buddhism. From the 3rd century CE, the region fell under the Sasanian Empire and became part of Khorasan.

=== Medieval times ===
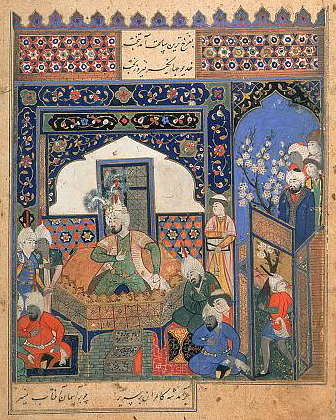
Timur is enthroned at Balkh (1550)

The Islamic conquest of Balkh in the early 8th century transformed the region into a major administrative and cultural center of Greater Khorasan. Under the Abbasid Caliphate, Balkh emerged as an important center of Islamic scholarship and trade, rivaling Merv and Nishapur. Between the 9th and 12th centuries, Balkh was ruled by the Samanids, Ghaznavids, and Seljuks. The city remained prosperous, supported by agriculture, caravan trade, and its strategic position between Transoxiana and Iran.

This period ended with the Mongol invasion of the Khwarazmian Empire. In 1220, Genghis Khan's forces devastated Balkh, causing massive destruction and depopulation. Further destruction followed during the campaigns of Timur in the 14th century. Travelers such as Marco Polo still referred to Balkh as a former center of learning, but Ibn Battuta described it in 1333 as largely ruined and abandoned. After Timur's capture of the city in 1389, Shah Rukh rebuilt the citadel in 1407. Despite partial recovery, Balkh never regained its former prominence, and regional importance shifted increasingly to Mazar-i-Sharif during the late medieval period.

=== Early modern period ===
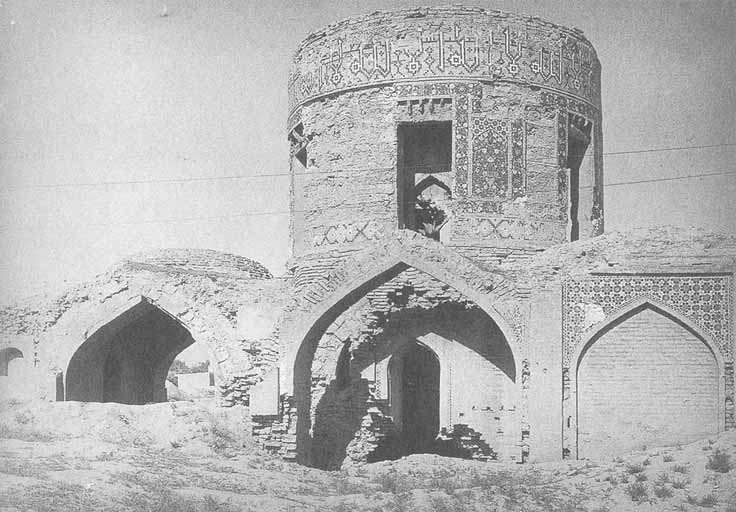
The tomb of Sharifah Soltan, Uzbek governor of Balkh from the early 17th century

From the 16th century onward, Balkh became a contested frontier between the Safavid Empire and the Uzbek rulers of the Khanate of Bukhara. Owing to its strategic location at the southern edge of Transoxiana, control over Balkh shifted repeatedly during the 16th and 17th centuries. In the early 18th century, the decline of Safavid power allowed Afghan forces to expand northward. After the foundation of the Afghan state under Ahmad Shah Durrani in 1747, Balkh was incorporated into the Durrani Empire. Despite this, Uzbek rulers from Bukhara continued to challenge Afghan authority into the early 19th century.

Only under the Barakzai dynasty was Balkh firmly integrated into the Afghan state. During this time, the ancient city of Balkh continued to decline, while Mazar-i-Sharif rose as the main administrative and religious center, driven by the growth of the Mausoleum of Imam Ali. By the late 19th century, Mazar-i-Sharif had effectively replaced Balkh as the provincial capital. By the early 20th century, Balkh Province had become a stable part of the Afghan kingdom, with an economy based on agriculture, irrigation, and trade with Central Asia.

=== During war times (1979–2021) ===
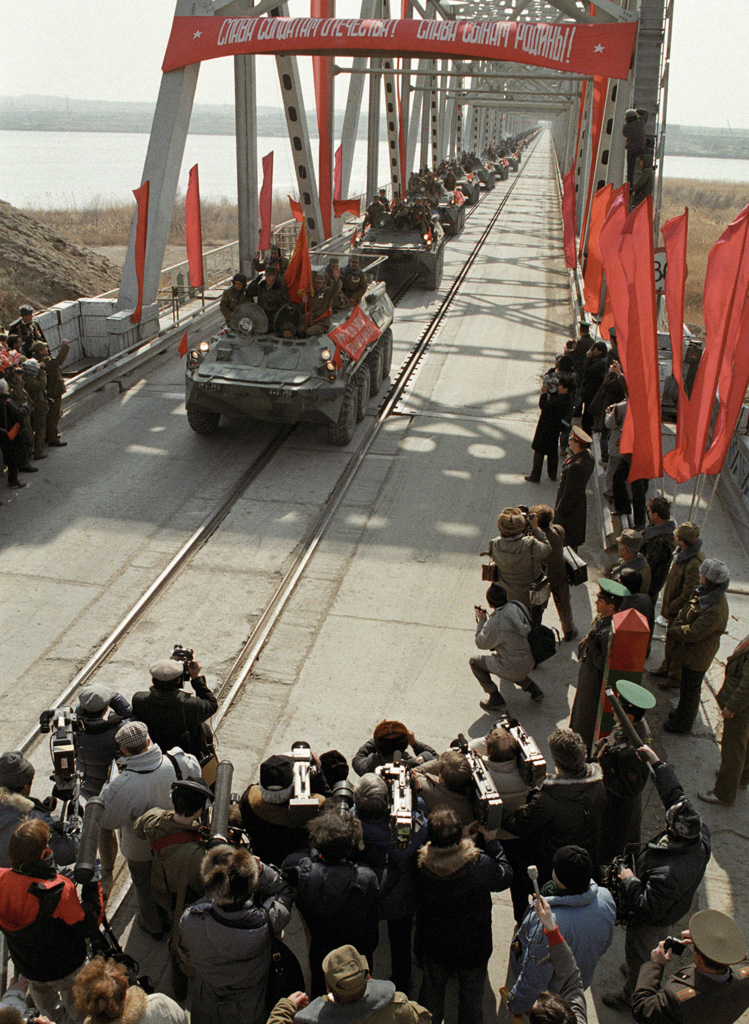
Final column of Soviet troops withdrawing from Afghanistan via the Hairatan Bridge (1989)

During the Soviet–Afghan War (1979–1989), Balkh held strategic importance as a northern transit region near the Soviet border. Although less devastated than other regions, it experienced repression, airstrikes in rural districts, and displacement. Mujahideen activity was carried out mainly from rural areas. After the collapse of the Afghan government in 1992, Balkh became part of the Afghan Civil War (1992–1996), controlled by northern mujahideen factions and later aligned with the Northern Alliance. The Taliban captured Mazar-i-Sharif in 1998 before being expelled during the U.S.-led intervention in late 2001.

After 2001, Balkh became one of Afghanistan's most stable provinces under the Islamic Republic of Afghanistan. Under Atta Muhammad Nur, the province experienced relative security, economic growth, and infrastructure development. Mazar-i-Sharif developed into a major transport hub connected to Uzbekistan via the Hairatan border crossing. Security deteriorated again in the late 2010s as insurgent activity increased. During the 2021 Taliban offensive, government control collapsed rapidly across the province.

=== Today (since 2021) ===
In August 2021, Balkh Province fell under Taliban control following the collapse of the Afghan government. Mazar-i-Sharif was taken with limited urban fighting, marking a major political shift in northern Afghanistan. Since then, Balkh has remained Afghanistan's most important northern trade and transit center. Agriculture, irrigation farming, logistics, and cross-border trade remain central to the economy. The Hairatan crossing continues to be the main commercial link of the country to Central Asia.

== Geography ==
Balkh is located in northern Afghanistan and forms one of the country‘s most important lowland regions. In contrast to the highly mountainous provinces of eastern and northeastern Afghanistan, Balkh is characterized by a combination of broad plains, river valleys, and semi-mountainous foothills. The province lies within the Amu Darya basin, giving it direct geographic continuity with Central Asia and shaping its long-standing strategic importance as a natural transit zone between Afghanistan and the north.

=== Landscape ===
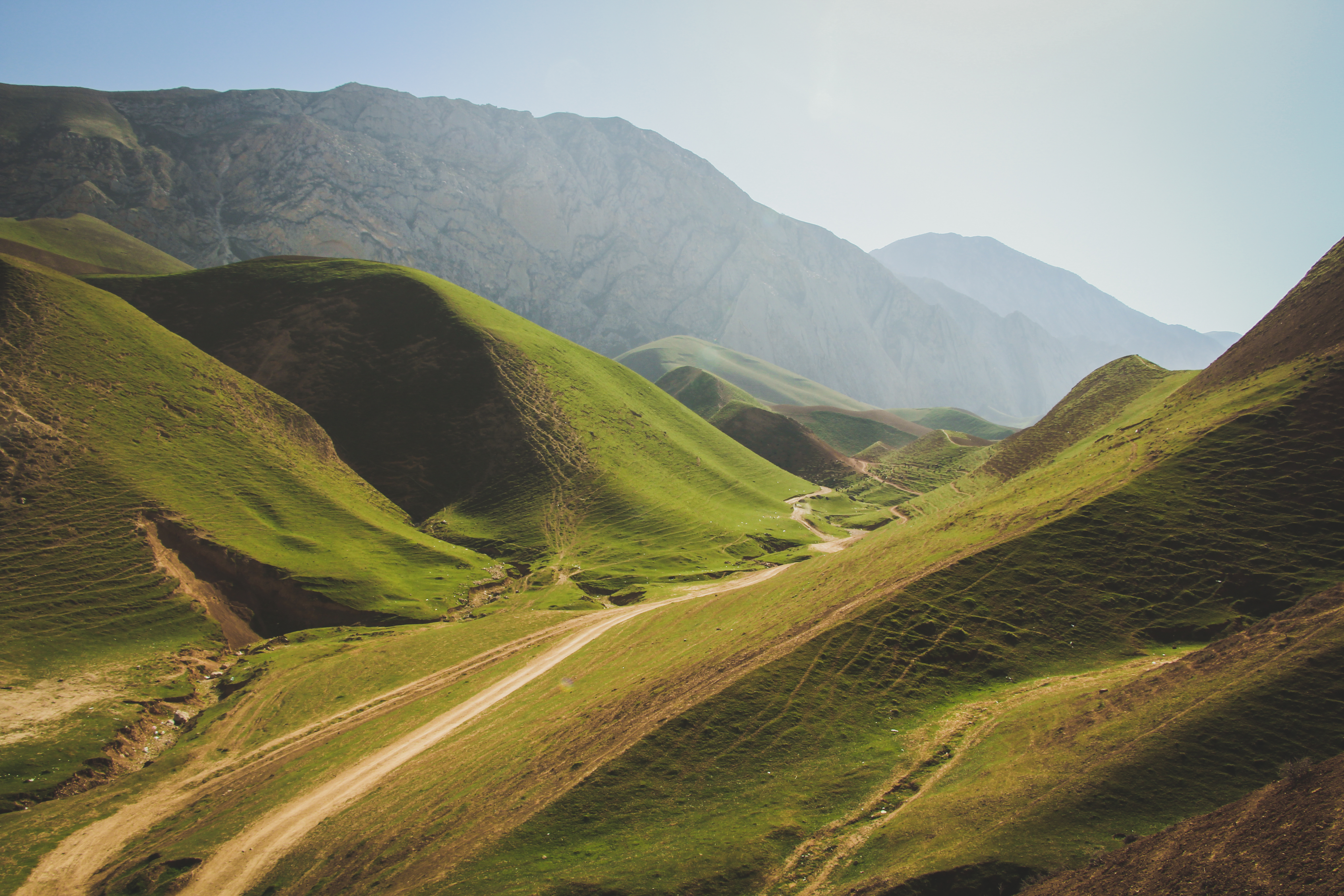
Aerial view of a valley near Mazar-i-Sharif (2012)

The physical geography of Balkh consists of a clear dual landform structure. Nearly half of the province is mountainous or semi-mountainous terrain (48.7%), mainly concentrated in the southern and southeastern zones, where the northern foothills of the Hindu Kush gradually rise from the plains. These upland areas are characterized by rolling hills, ridges, and shallow valleys that form the transition zone between higher mountain systems further south and the flat lowlands to the north. About half of the surface area (50.2%) consists of flat lowland plains extending across the northern part of the province. These plains form part of the wider northern Afghan plain, one of the largest continuous flat regions in the country, and are marked by low relief, fertile alluvial soils, and broad open landscapes.

The Amu Darya forms the northern boundary of the province and represents the dominant river system of the region. It functions as both a natural border and the primary hydrological axis of northern Balkh. A network of smaller seasonal and perennial rivers originates in the southern foothills and flows northward into the plains, forming natural drainage channels and supporting localized riparian zones. The gradual transition from foothill zones to open lowland plains strongly shapes settlement patterns, transport routes, and regional accessibility, with most major corridors following the natural slope and river systems of the province.

=== Flora and fauna ===
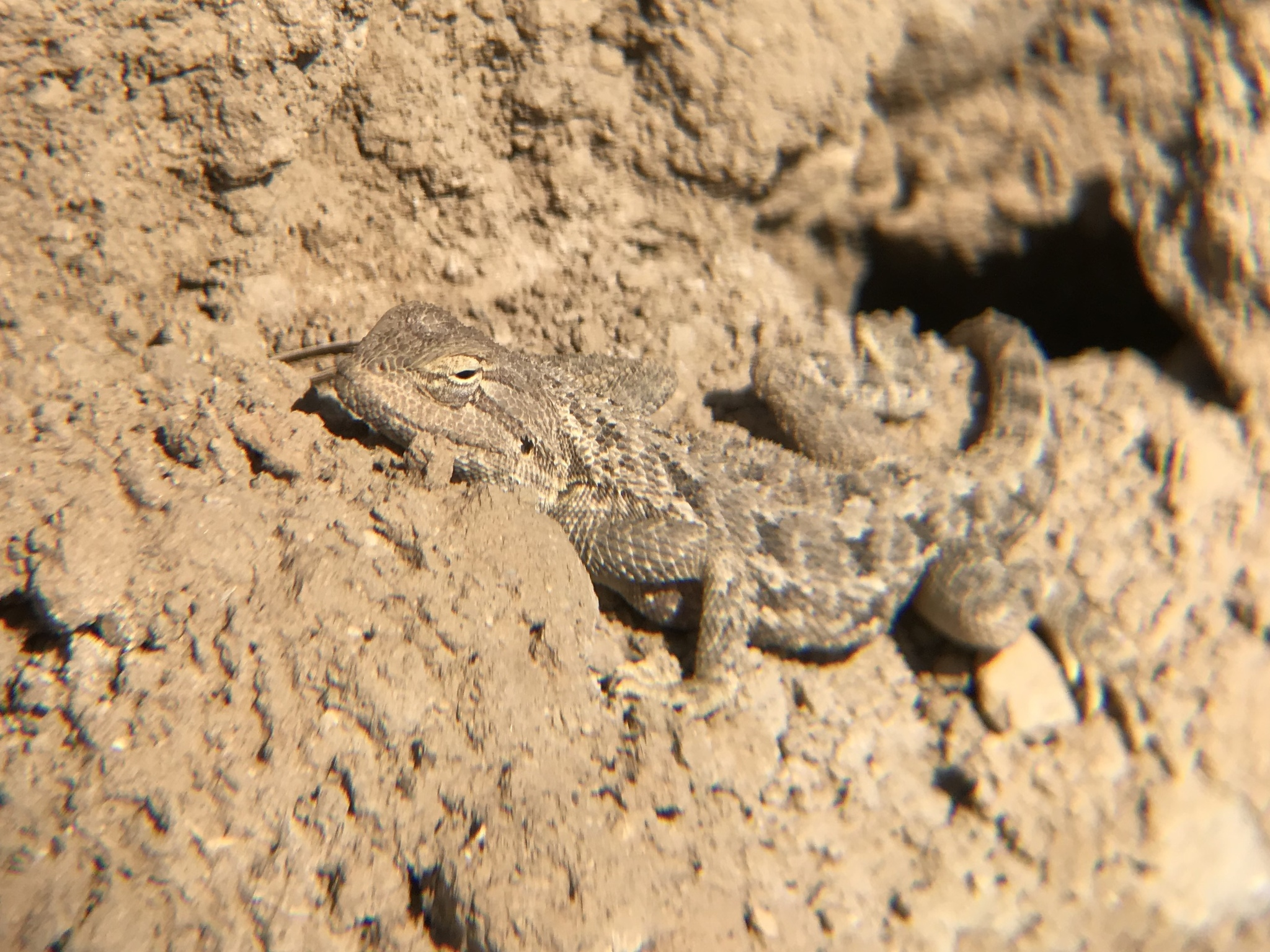
A ground agama in Balkh (2019)

The natural vegetation of Balkh reflects its semi-arid lowland and foothill environment. Outside intensively settled zones, the landscape is dominated by dry steppe grasses, shrubs such as wormwood and saxaul, and other drought-resistant plants adapted to limited rainfall and high summer temperatures. Riparian zones along rivers and canals support denser vegetation, including poplar and willow species, as well as scattered mulberry and apricot trees in suitable foothill and valley areas. Wildlife diversity is limited due to long-term human settlement and land transformation. Typical fauna consists primarily of small mammals such as jerboas and hares, reptiles including agamas and various gecko species, and numerous bird species such as larks, shrikes, and bee-eaters along river corridors. Larger wild animal populations are rare within the province.

=== Climate ===
Balkh has a continental arid to semi-arid climate, characterized by hot summers and cold winters. Summer temperatures frequently exceed 30 °C and can rise above 40 °C during heatwaves, particularly in the lowland plains of northern Balkh. Winters are cold, with nighttime temperatures often falling well below freezing, especially in rural and less densely built-up areas. Precipitation is generally low and strongly seasonal, occurring mainly during winter and early spring, often in the form of rain and occasional snowfall. Annual rainfall is insufficient for rain-fed agriculture without irrigation in most parts of the province. Summers are typically dry, with extended periods of drought and high evaporation rates due to intense solar radiation and persistent dry winds. Dust storms and strong seasonal winds are common, especially during late spring and summer, contributing to soil erosion and reduced air quality.

== Government and politics ==
=== Local governance ===
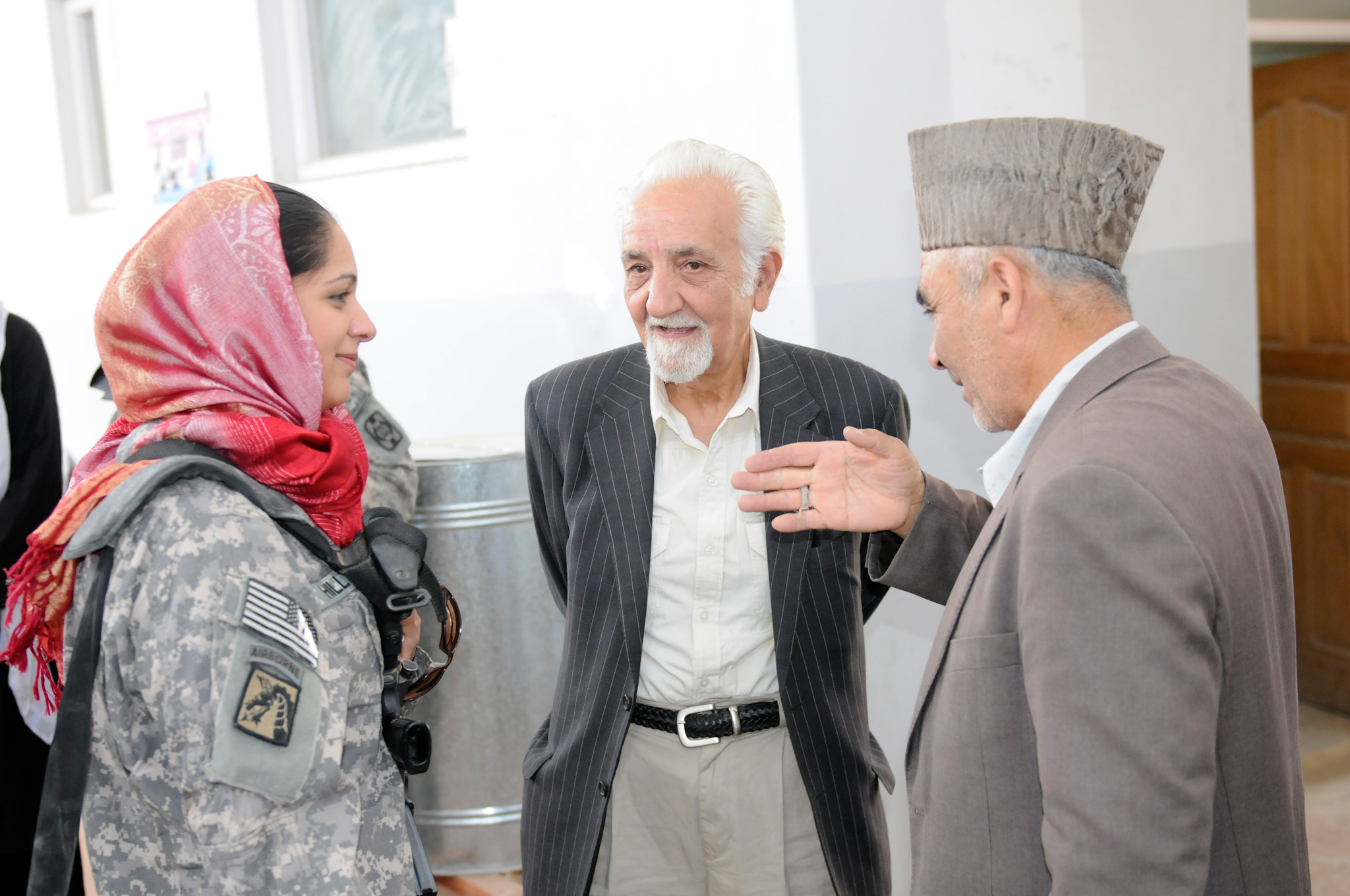
District governors of Balkh discussing during a monthly shura (2012)

The system of local governance in Balkh has historically been shaped by the role of the region as a political and economic center of northern Afghanistan. During the 19th century, authority in Balkh was exercised through a combination of local khans, tribal leaders, and representatives of the Afghan monarchy, who governed with varying degrees of autonomy while acknowledging the sovereignty of Kabul. In the early 20th century, successive Afghan governments sought to strengthen central authority by formalizing provincial administration, introducing appointed governors, and expanding state institutions in urban centers such as Mazar-i-Sharif.

From 1979 onward, Balkh experienced repeated transformations of local governance as a result of the Soviet–Afghan War, the subsequent civil war, and the period of Taliban rule. During the 1980s and 1990s, local mujahideen commanders and regional power brokers exercised substantial influence over security and administration. Following the establishment of the Islamic Republic of Afghanistan post-2001, formal governance structures were restored through appointed provincial and district officials, while local councils and traditional elders continued to mediate disputes and manage community affairs at the village level.

After the Taliban takeover in 2021, the system of local governance was reorganized under the administrative framework of the Islamic Emirate of Afghanistan. Provincial and district authorities are now appointed directly by the central leadership. Political parties recognized under the former republican constitution are no longer active, while religious authorities, tribal networks, and informal mediation structures continue to exercise influence, particularly in rural areas.

As of December 2025, the governor of Balkh is Haji Muhammad Yousuf Wafa.

=== Administrative divisions ===
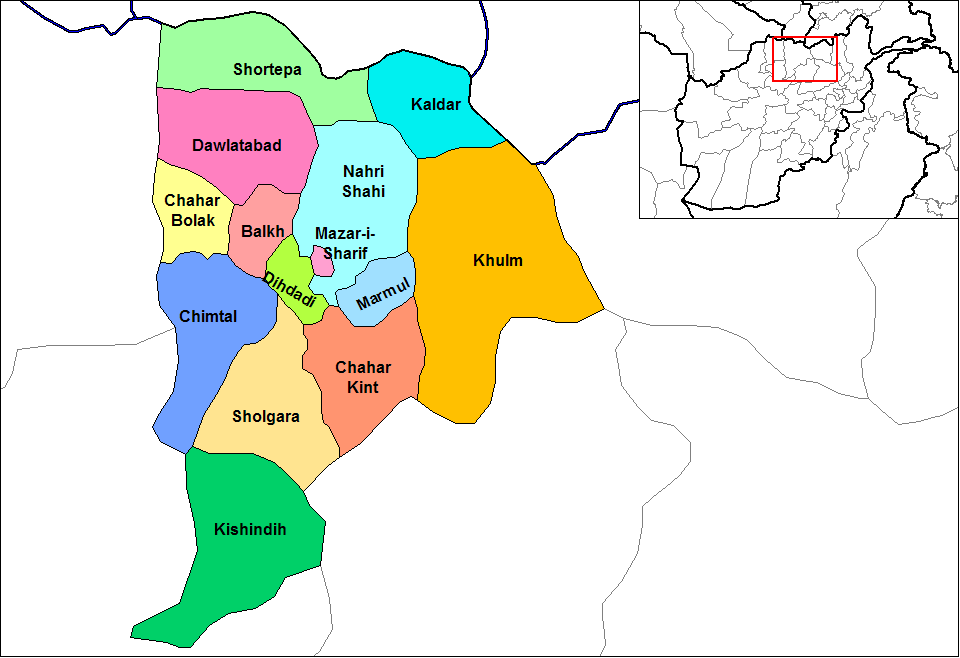
Map of the districts of Balkh as of January 2004, prior to the redrawing of provincial and district boundaries later that year

Balkh is subdivided into 15 districts, each administered by a district governor appointed by the national and provincial authorities. The provincial capital is Mazar-i-Sharif, which also serves as the main political, economic, and transportation hub of northern Afghanistan. Other major districts include Balkh, Dawlatabad, Sholgara, Charkint, and Zari. Administrative boundaries reflect both geographic and demographic factors, with district centers typically located along major roads, river corridors, or population clusters. District administrations are responsible for basic governance functions such as civil registration, local policing, coordination of public services, and communication between communities and provincial authorities.

Districts of Balkh Province
District	Capital	Population	Area	Pop. density	Notes
Balkh		136,097	536	254	Predominantly Farsiwans, few Uzbeks and Hazaras.
Charbolak		91,539	607	151	Majority Pashtuns, minority Farsiwans (Tajiks, Arabs).
Charkint		50,220	1,222	41	Majority Uzbeks, minority Kazakhs and Pashtuns, some Farsiwans.
Chimtal		103,630	1,917	54	Majority Uzbeks, minority Farsiwans, Pashtuns and Hazaras.
Dawlatabad		119,083	1,804	66	Majority Farsiwans, minority Uzbeks, Hazaras, Turkmens, Pashtuns.
Dihdadi		76,261	274	278	Mixed Kyrgyz, Farsiwans and Hazaras.
Kaldar		22,586	803	28	Predominantly Uzbeks.
Khulm	Tashqurghan	83,032	3,204	26	91 villages. Mix of Uzbeks, Farsiwans (Arabs, Aimaq), Pashtuns, Hazaras. Used to be part of Samangan Province.
Kishindih		55,003	1,083	51	Majority Hazaras, minority Pashtuns and Uzbeks.
Marmul		12,888	375	34	Majority Farsiwans, minority Uzbeks, few Kyrgyz.
	Mazar-e-Sharif	484,492	67	7,218	50% Farsiwans, 27% Pashtuns, 12% Turkmens, 11% Uzbeks.
Nahri Shahi		50,752	1,409	36	Predominantly Farsiwans, some Uzbeks and Hazaras.
Sholgara		129,271	1,755	74	40% Farsiwans (Tajiks, Arabs), 20% Pashtuns (Kandahari, Baloch, Kuchi), 20% Hazaras, 20% Uzbeks.
Shortepa		44,773	1,563	29	Predominantely Turkmens, few Uzbeks.
Zari		49,556	869	57	Predominantly Hazaras. Used to be part of Kishindih District.
Balkh		1,509,183	16,186	93	43.5% Farsiwan (Tajiks, Persianized Arabs, Aimaqs), 27.0% Turkic (17.4% Uzbeks, 7.4% Turkmens, 1.7% Kyrgyz, 0.5% Kazakhs), 18.3% Pashtuns (Kandahari, Balochi, Kochi), 11.9% Hazaras. (Note: Note: "Predominantely" or "dominated" is interpreted as 99%, "majority" as 70%, "mixed" as 1/(number of ethnicities), "minority" as 30% and "few" or "some" as 1%.)

=== Security ===
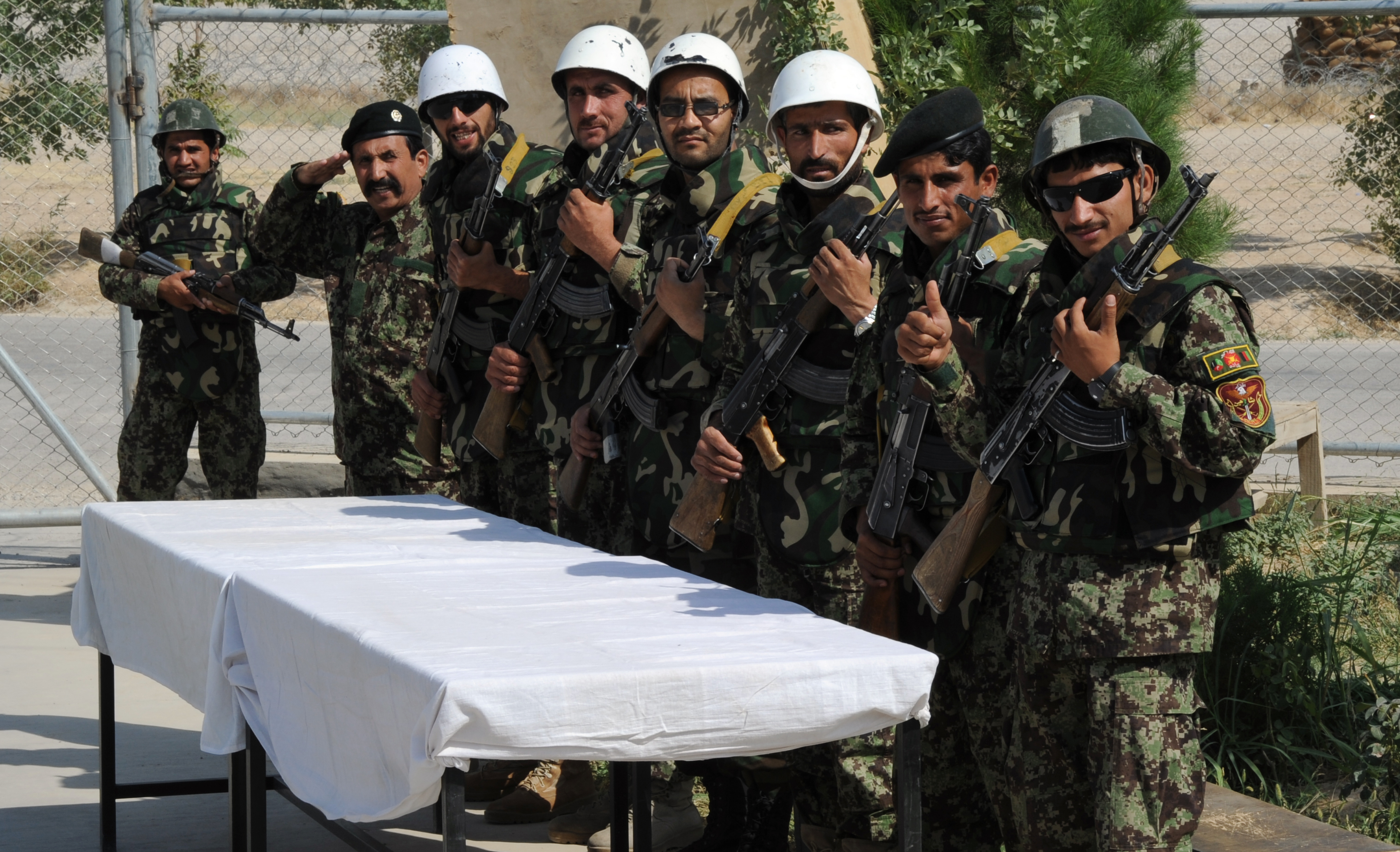
Afghan National Army soldiers in Balkh (2009)

The security situation in Balkh has historically been shaped by its strategic location in northern Afghanistan and its proximity to the Amu Darya and Central Asia. During the period of the Islamic Republic of Afghanistan, Balkh was considered one of the more stable provinces, particularly under the long-term influence of regional power structures centered in Mazar-i-Sharif. Since the Taliban takeover in 2021, security control in the province is exercised by security forces and local police units of the Islamic Emirate. Large-scale armed conflict has largely ceased, and urban centers currently experience relatively stable internal security compared to many other regions of the country. However, security challenges persist, including the presence of rival militant groups, occasional targeted attacks, and concerns over cross-border trafficking.

== Economy ==
The economy of Balkh is primarily based on agriculture, mining, and trade. The provincial capital, Mazar-i-Sharif, serves as a commercial hub, connecting rural producers with domestic and regional markets. Economic activity is heavily influenced by fertile plains, irrigation infrastructure, and access to transportation networks.

=== Agriculture and animal husbandry ===
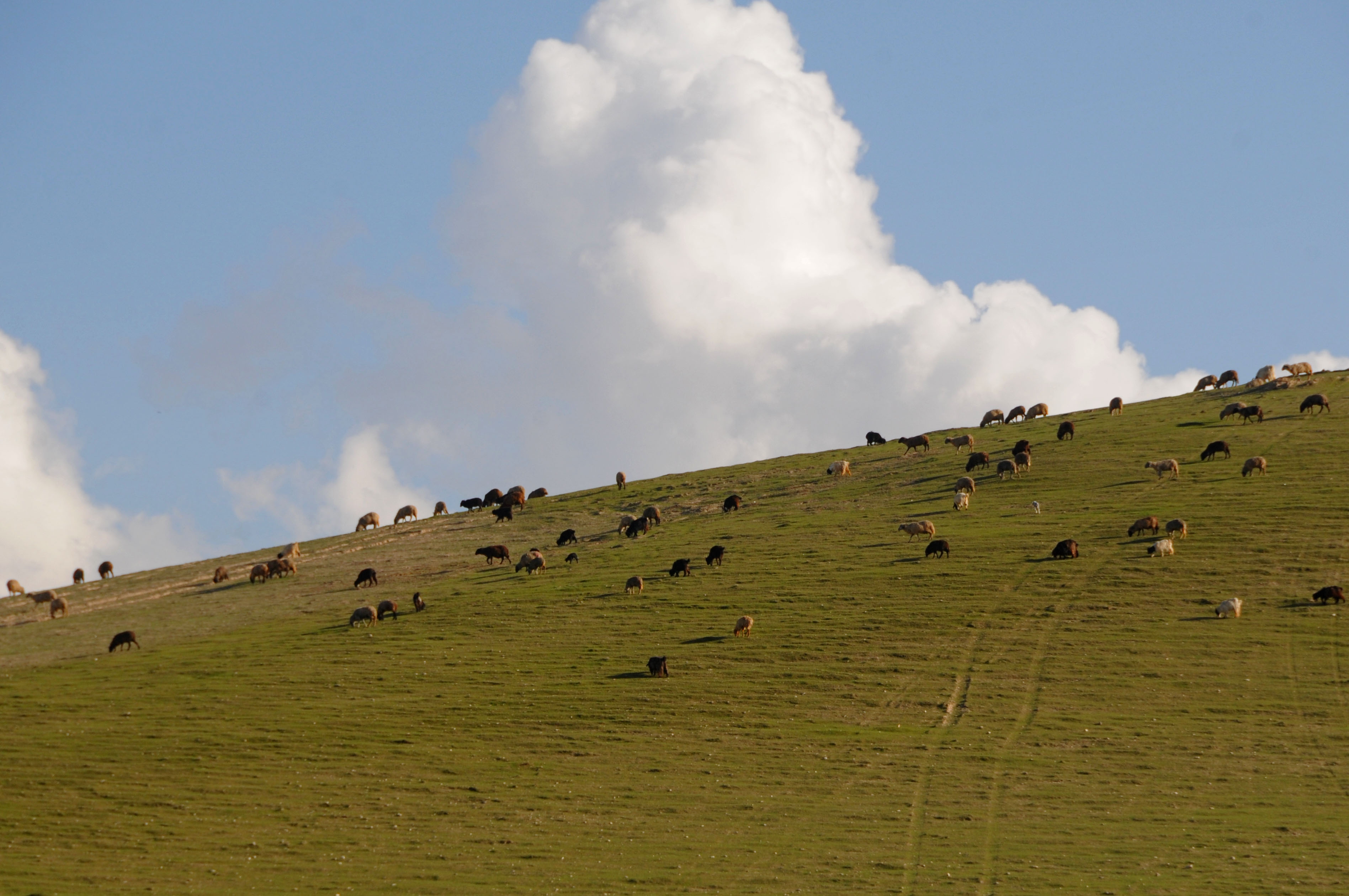
Grazing sheep on a hill in Balkh (2009)

Like in other parts of Afghanistan, agriculture plays a central role in Balkh's economy. The province is known for producing a variety of crops, including grains, fruits, and vegetables. Melons and grapes are particularly well-regarded for their quality and sweetness. Animal husbandry, including the raising of sheep, goats, and cattle, complements crop production and provides an additional source of income for rural households.

=== Mining and industry ===
Balkh possesses significant mineral resources, including copper, gypsum, gravel, sand, and petroleum. Mining activities are diverse and include operations in the Balkhab copper mine, as well as extraction of industrial minerals across the province. These resources provide employment opportunities and form a growing part of the provincial economy. Small-scale industries, including food processing and production of construction materials, are concentrated mainly in Mazar-i-Sharif and other district centers, supporting both local consumption and regional trade.

=== Trade ===
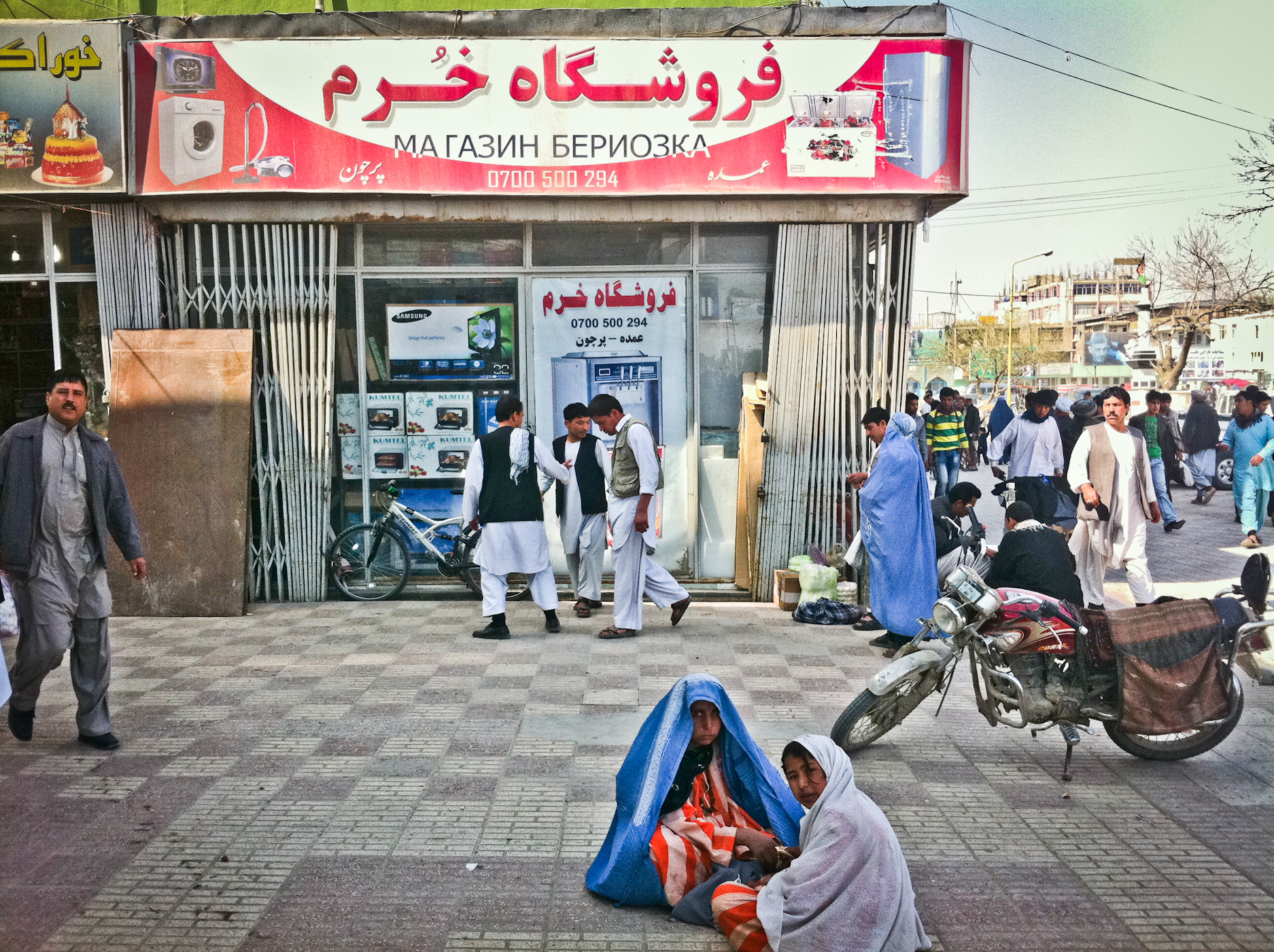
Scene at a market place in Mazar-i-Sharif (2011)

Balkh has long served as a regional commercial hub due to its strategic location in northern Afghanistan and proximity to the Amu Darya and borders with neighboring provinces and countries. Local markets in Mazar-i-Sharif and district centers facilitate the exchange of agricultural products, livestock, and mined materials. Cross-border trade with Uzbekistan and other northern neighbors contributes to the provincial economy, including the import of consumer goods and the export of local products. Wholesale and retail trade networks are concentrated in urban centers, while smaller bazaars and weekly markets serve rural communities.

=== Energy and irrigation ===
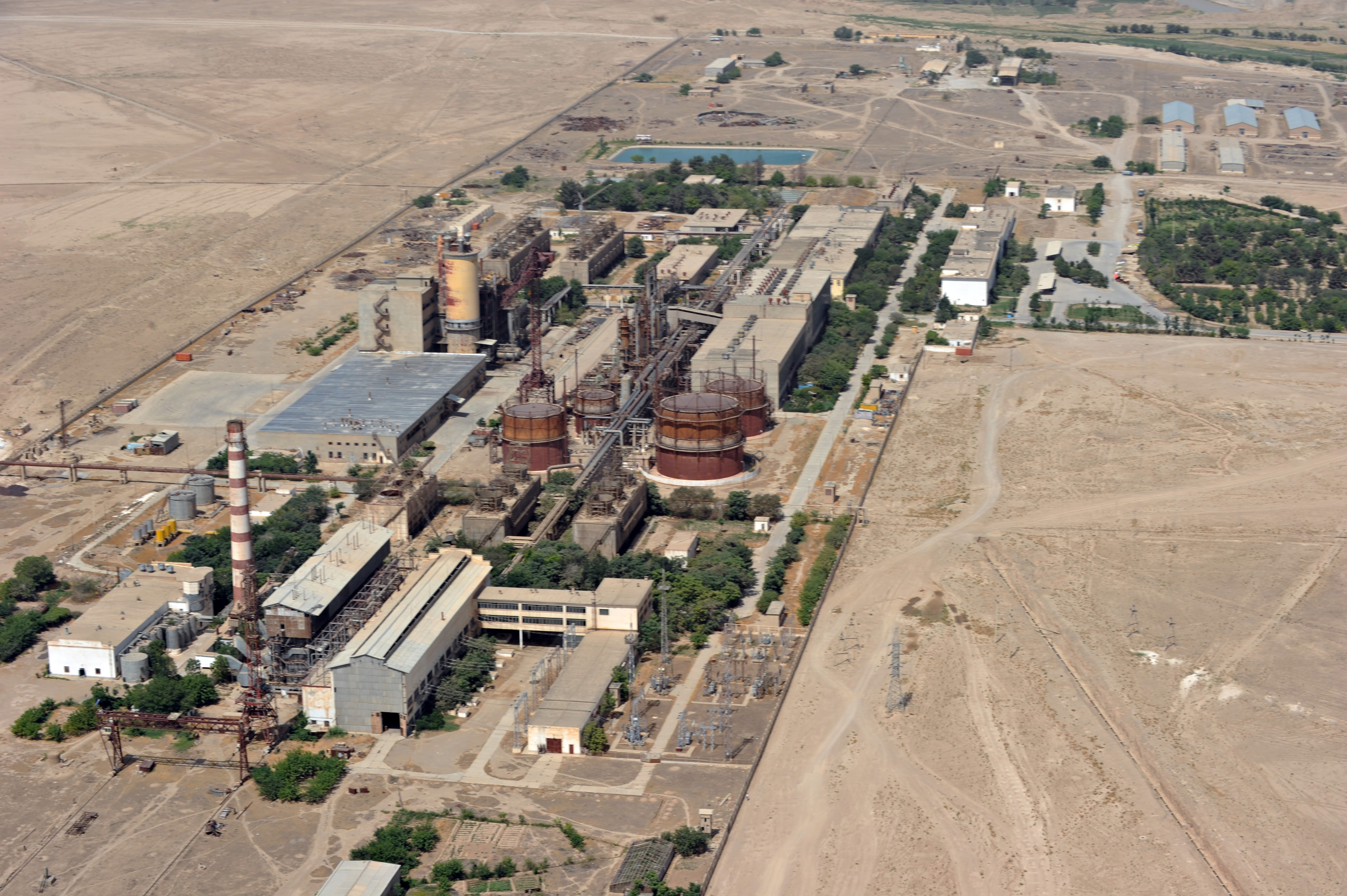
Gas fired power plant in Mazar-i-Sharif (2011)

Balkh's energy sector relies primarily on local electricity generation and limited access to national grid connections. Small-scale hydropower projects on rivers and canals and solar power plants supply electricity to urban centers and nearby rural communities, while fuel-based generators are used in areas without stable power. Efforts to expand reliable electricity provision are ongoing, with emphasis on improving both urban and rural access.

Irrigation is a vital component of Balkh's agricultural economy. Existing river system and canal networks provide water for crop cultivation, while ongoing and planned infrastructure projects aim to expand the area of irrigated land. Initiatives such as the construction of the Qosh Tepa Canal and improvements in water management are expected to enhance agricultural productivity, support sustainable food production, and accommodate population growth in the province.

=== Tourism ===
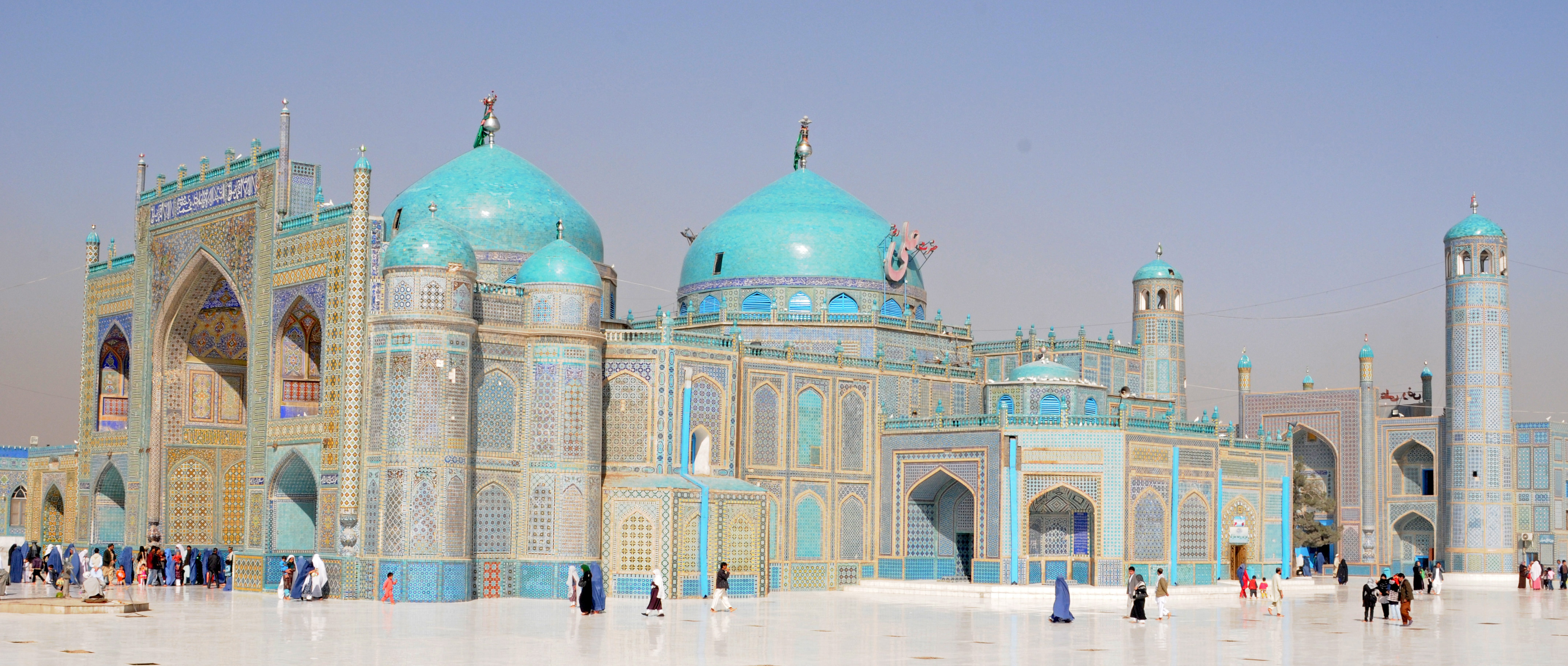
The Blue Mosque of Mazar-i-Sharif is the most famous tourist attraction in the province

Tourism in Balkh has grown in recent years, benefiting from the province's historical, cultural, and natural sites. The capital, Mazar-i-Sharif, draws visitors with the famous Blue Mosque, ancient ruins, traditional bazaars, and other landmarks. The district of Sholgara, with its rivers and lush landscapes, has become a popular spot for picnics, swimming, and outdoor recreation. Improved security under the Islamic Emirate has encouraged more domestic tourism, allowing families and groups to travel safely across the province. While infrastructure and seasonal accessibility remain challenges, efforts to promote cultural heritage and local attractions continue to support tourism development.

=== Communication ===
Communication services have been gradually expanding, connecting both urban and rural communities. Mazar-i-Sharif serves as the main hub, with the central post office and several private courier services, while smaller districts often have only limited postal options. Mobile networks are widely available, although coverage can be weak in more remote areas. Internet access, through broadband and mobile networks, supports education, business, and social activities, but speeds and reliability are lower outside urban centers. Ongoing improvements in telecommunications are enhancing connectivity for residents, businesses, and visitors across the province.

=== Transportation and infrastructure ===
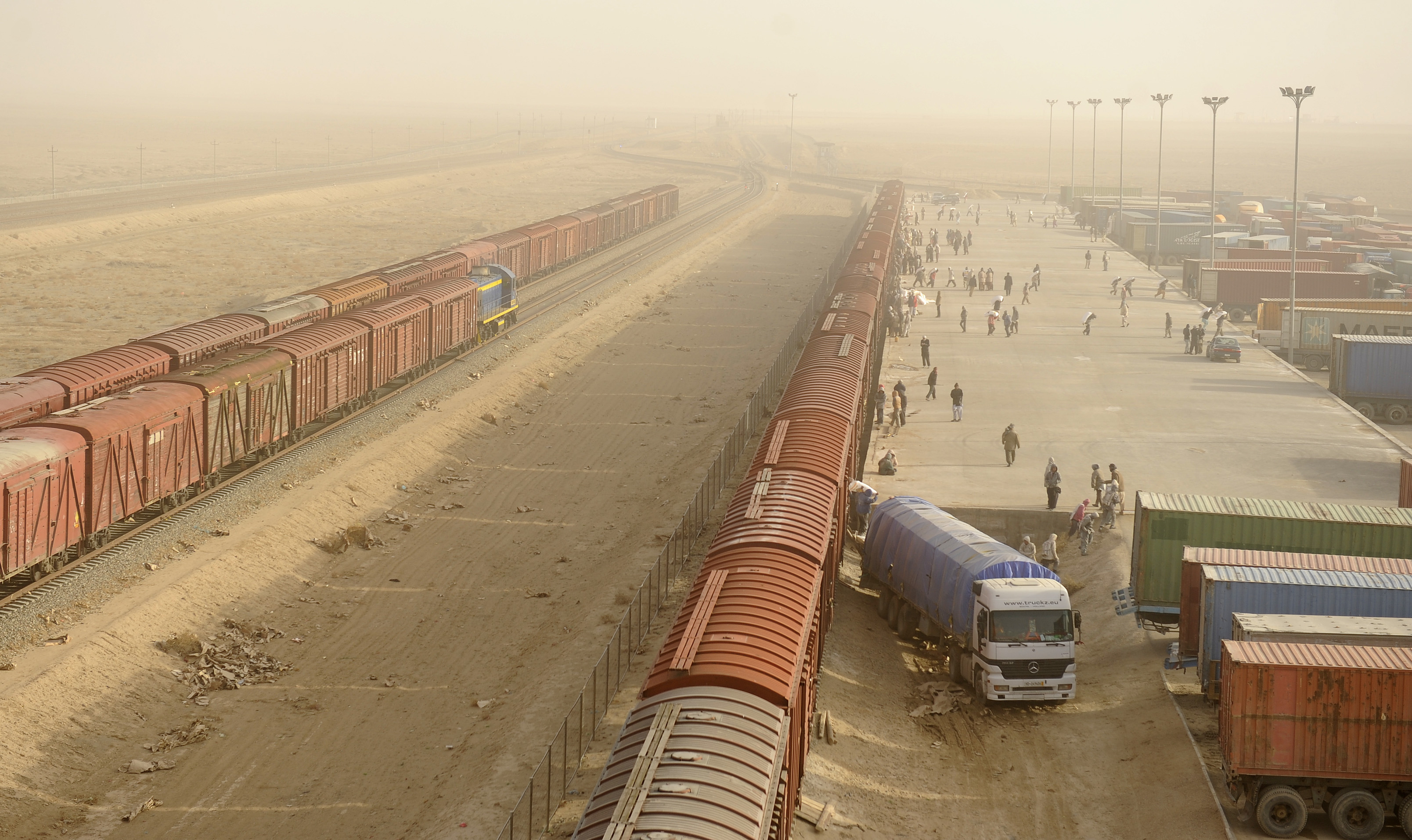
Freight trains at the Hairatan–Mazar-i-Sharif Railway Project (2013)

The transportation infrastructure includes a network of paved highways and unpaved roads connecting the provincial capital, Mazar-i-Sharif, with district centers and neighboring provinces and countries. Public buses, shared taxis, and private vehicles provide the main modes of transport within and between districts. The province also has a limited railroad network, mainly used for freight transport, including the Hairatan–Mazar-i-Sharif Railway Project which has improved connectivity with Uzbekistan. Mazar-i-Sharif International Airport offers domestic and occasional international flights, enhancing regional connectivity. Despite these developments, infrastructure in rural areas remains underdeveloped, and seasonal weather can affect road accessibility.

== Demographics ==
=== Population ===
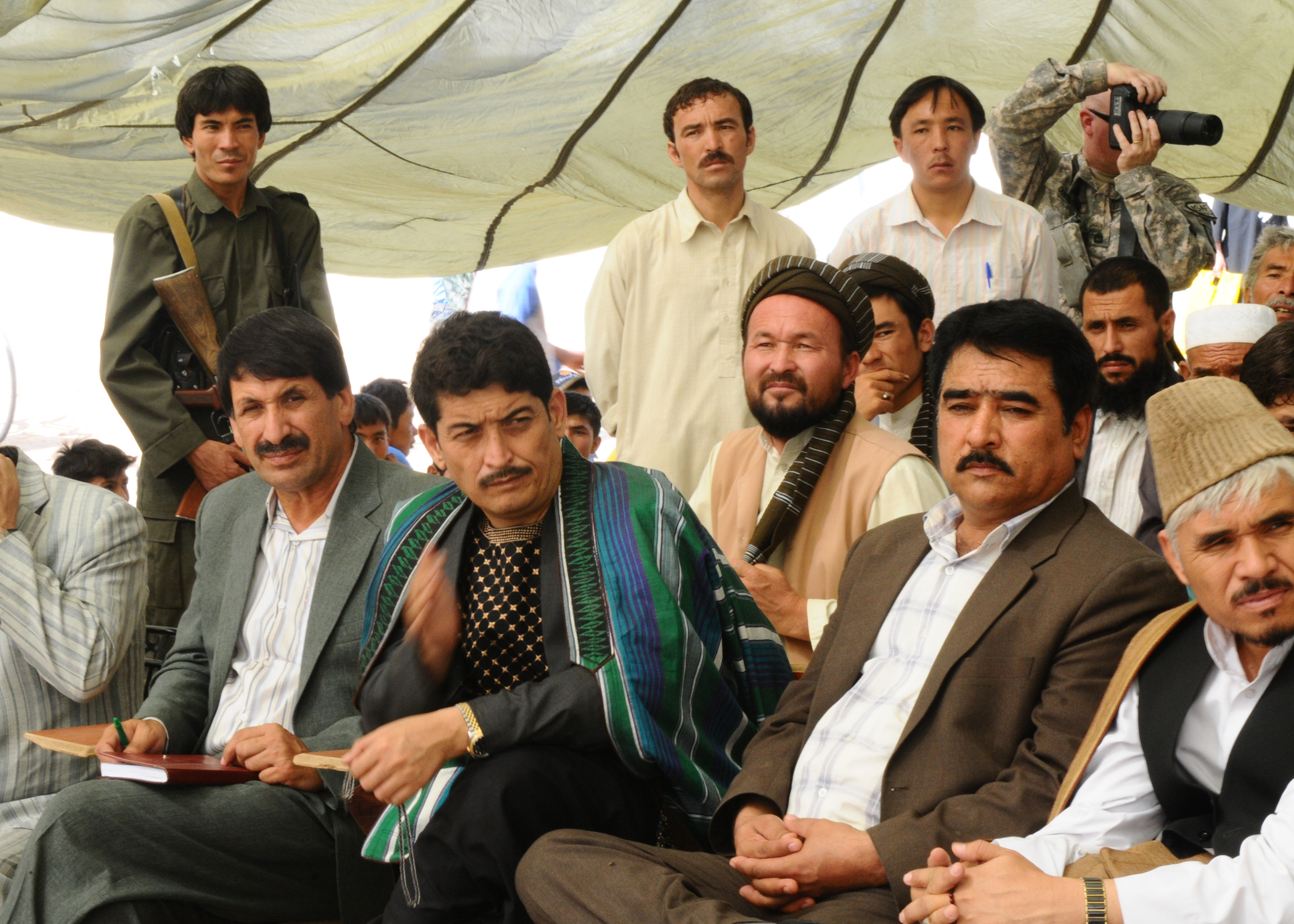
Balkhi men of different backgrounds

Balkh province has an estimated population of approximately 1.6 million people as of 2023, spread across urban centers, small towns, and rural villages. About 34% of residents live in urban areas such as Mazar-i-Sharif, Balkh, Nahrin, and Dahana-e-Ghuri, while the majority reside in rural districts. The population is roughly balanced between men (51%) and women (49%). Poverty and limited infrastructure continue to affect living conditions, particularly in remote districts, with a multidimensional poverty index of 0.229, and 21.6% of the population living in severe poverty as of 2023.

=== Ethnicity, languages, and religion ===
As in all of Afghanistan, ethnic and religious identities are often fluid and overlapping, shaped by centuries of migration, trade, and intermarriage. The province is ethnically diverse, including the majority Tajiks and Pashtuns, and the minority Uzbeks, Hazaras, Turkmen, Arabs, Baloch, and other minority groups. Dari is the most widely spoken language, followed by Pashto, Turkmen, and Uzbek, with many residents being multilingual. The population is predominantly Sunni Muslim, with Shia and Ismaili minorities in certain areas, reflecting long-standing cultural and religious coexistence.

Estimated ethnolinguistic and -religious composition
Ethnicity	Tajik/ Farsiwan	Hazara	Arab	Pashtun	Turkmen	Uzbek	Others	Sources
Period	Tajik/ Farsiwan	Hazara	Arab	Pashtun	Turkmen	Uzbek	Others	Sources

2004–2021 (Islamic Republic)	≤46%	≤12%	≤7%	10 – 27%	12 – 15%	10 – 11%	∅
2018 UN	46%	12%	7%	10%	15%	10%	–
2015 NPS	50% (Note: incl. Sunni Hazara, also called Kawshi.)			27%	11.9%	10.7%	–
2015 CP	50%			27%	12%	11%	∅ (Note: incl. Baloch.)
2011 PRT	50%			27% (Note: excl. Kochi.)	11.9%	10.7%	∅ (Note: incl. Baloch.)
2011 USA	50%			27%	12%	11%	–

Legend:
- ∅: Ethnicity mentioned in source but not quantified
- –: Ethnicity not mentioned specifically
- Source abbreviations: Empirical sources: –, Government sources: CP – Colombo Plan, PRT – Provincial Reconstruction Team of the United States government, UN – United Nations Assistance Mission in Afghanistan, Editorial sources: NPS – Naval Postgraduate School, USA – United States Army.

=== Education ===
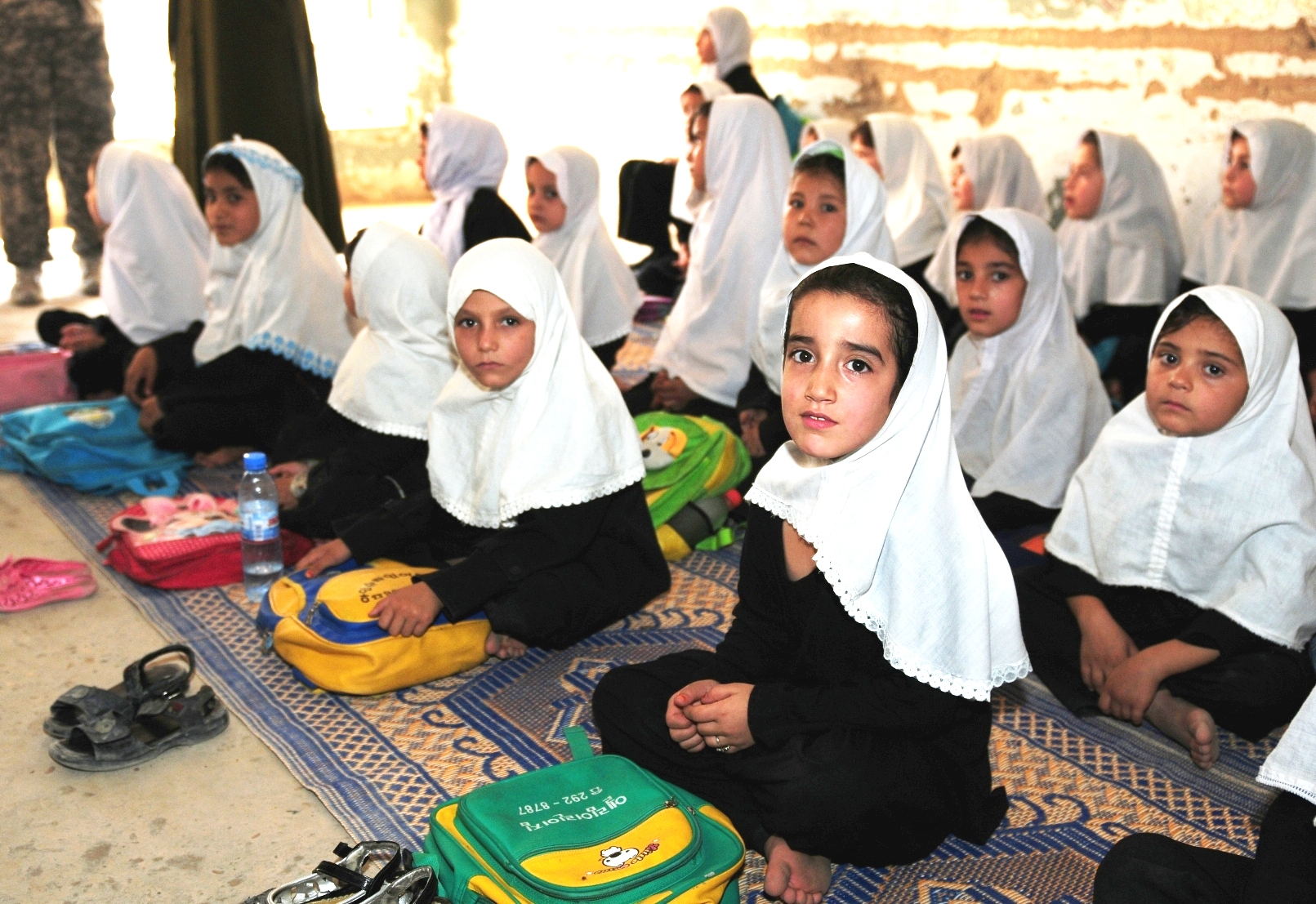
Students at a girls secondary school in Mazar-i-Sharif (2011)

Education access varies widely across the province. As of 2015, there are over 150 primary schools, over 200 secondary schools, and almost 100 high schools, with a student-to-teacher ratio of 37:1. Literacy rates remain low, especially among women, with the most recent estimates from 2011 indicating an overall literacy rate of 23% (male 38%, female 19%) and an overall net enrolment rate for school-age children of approximately 46%. Higher education is concentrated in Mazar-i-Sharif, including Balkh University with over 4,000 students. NGOs and vocational institutes support education, particularly in rural areas. Since 2021, the education system has been restructured under the Taliban administration, with madrasas expanding across urban and rural areas and restrictions significantly limiting female access to secondary and higher education.

=== Health ===
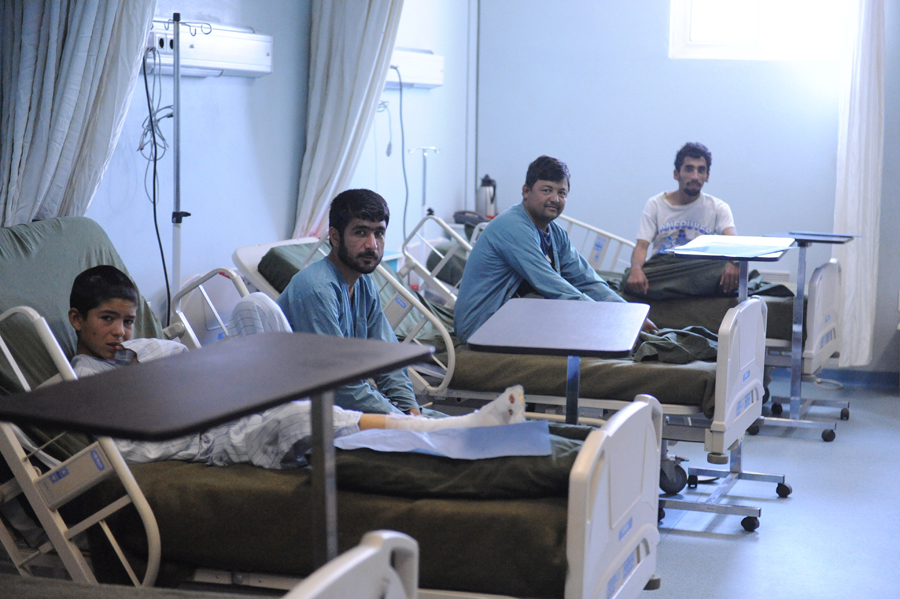
Patients in a regional hospital near Mazar-i-Sharif (2010)

Healthcare is concentrated in urban centers, with 8 hospitals and around 50 clinics providing primary and specialized services. Around 82% of the population can access a health facility within an hour by foot or animal transport. Common challenges include high infant and maternal mortality, malnutrition, and limited access to clean water and sanitation, with the most recent available estimates from 2011 indicating that 15% of households had access to clean drinking water and 20% of births were attended by a skilled birth attendant. International NGOs continue to support health services, particularly in remote and underserved districts.

== Culture ==
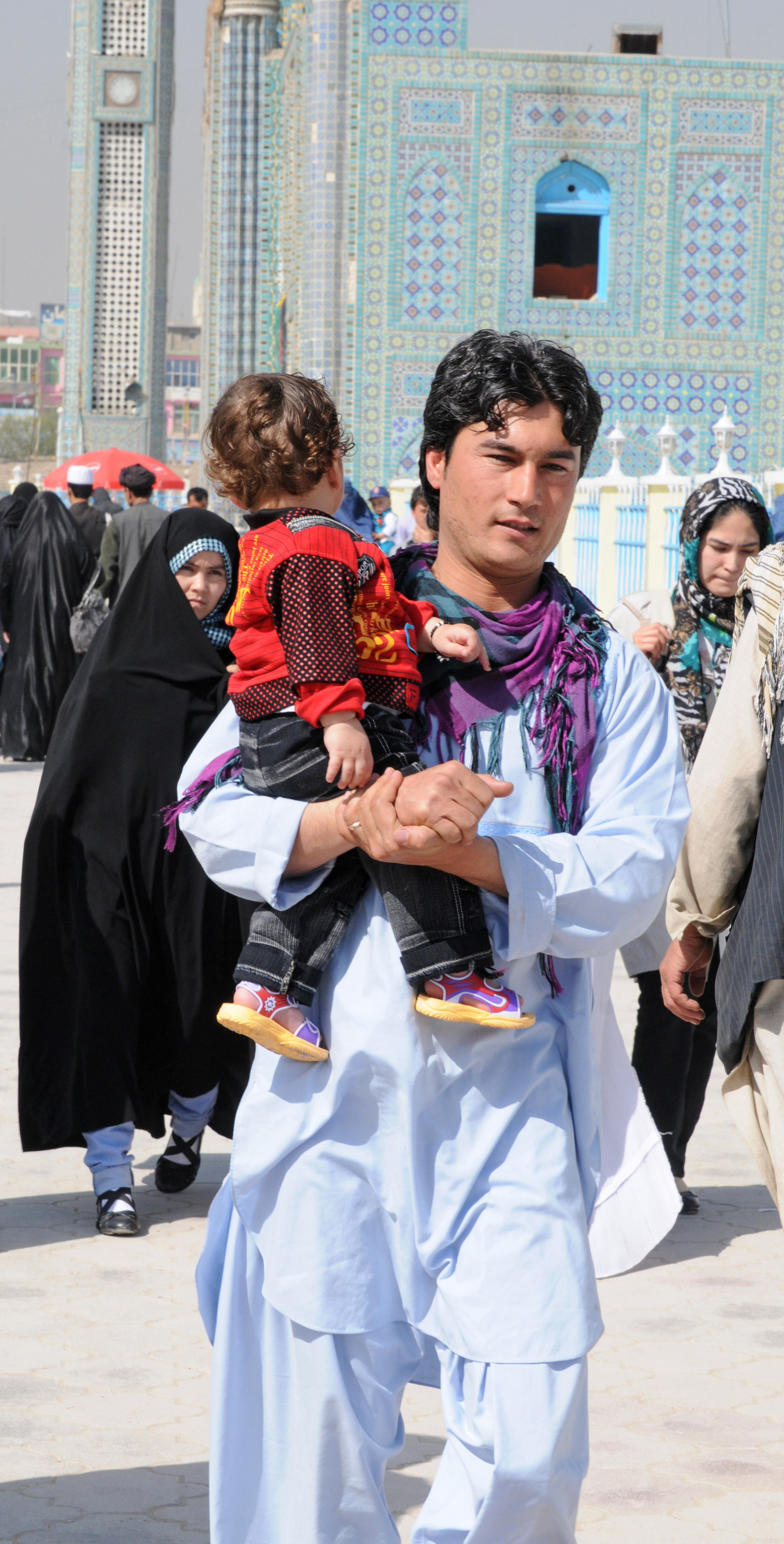
Men, women and children in typical attire (2012)

=== Music and dances ===
Balkh has a rich musical heritage that reflects the broader northern Afghan and Central Asian traditions. One notable local style is qataghani, which features rhythmic melodies often played on the dambura and rubab and is traditionally performed during weddings, seasonal celebrations, and social gatherings. Regional dances, including group circle dances performed during weddings and Nowruz celebrations, remain popular.

=== Dresses and attire ===
Traditional clothing in Balkh varies by ethnicity and occasion. Men often wear loose trousers, long shirts, and distinctive hats such as the pakol or embroidered caps, while women wear colorful dresses with intricate embroidery, often paired with scarves or veils. Wedding and festival attire is especially ornate, featuring bright fabrics, metallic threads, and jewelry that reflects local craftsmanship.

=== Cuisine ===
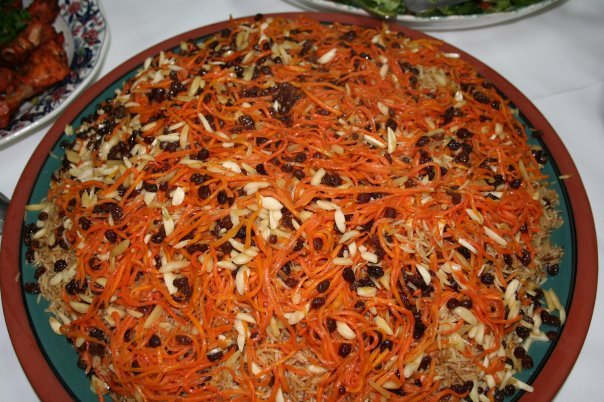
Qabeli palaw is considered to be the national dish of Afghanistan

The cuisine of Balkh reflects the broader food traditions of northern Afghanistan, shaped by Uzbek, Turkmen, and Pashtun influences. Although considered Afghanistan's national dish and therefore eaten across the country, one of the most characteristic regional dishes is qabeli palaw, prepared with locally grown rice, carrots, raisins, and lamb. Mantu and ashak dumplings are widely consumed and, even though eaten all over Afghanistan, are especially associated with northern Afghan culture, including Mazar-i-Sharif. Naan, dairy products such as qurut, and seasonal fruits from surrounding agricultural areas like grapes and melons form essential components of daily nutrition. Tea culture is deeply rooted, with green tea served throughout the day, often accompanied by nuts and dried fruits.

=== Architecture, art, and literature ===
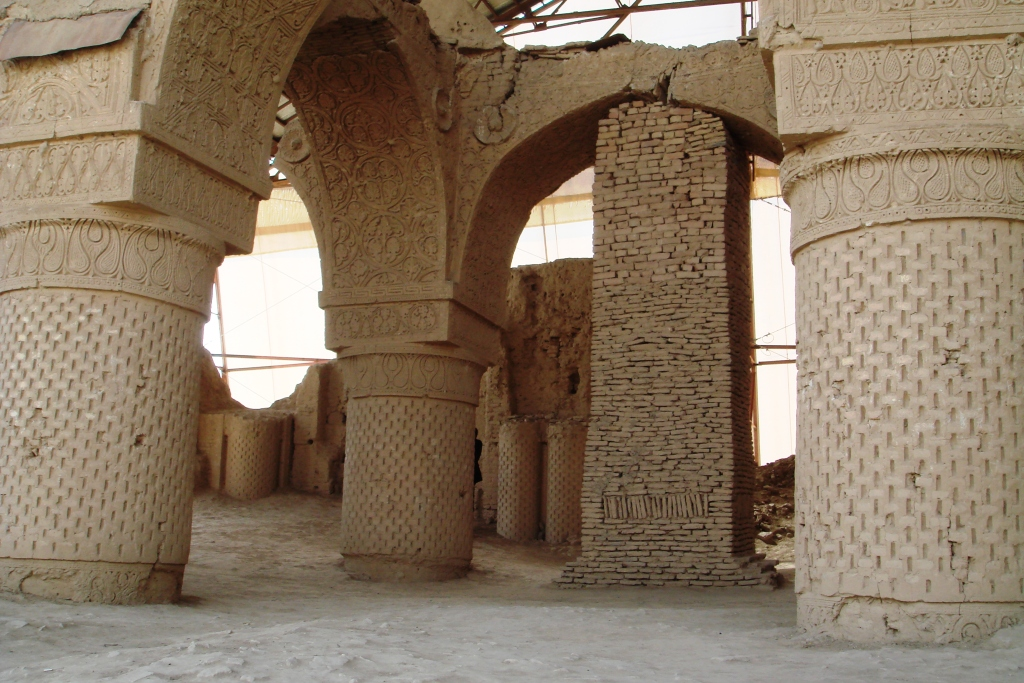
The Haji Piyada Mosque near Balkh representative of Abbasid architecture in the province

The province is home to historic architecture that reflects a wide range of architectural styles, shaped by its long cultural and political history. These include pre-Islamic Persian and Bactrian architecture, visible in archaeological remains around ancient Balkh, early Abbasid architecture in the early middle ages, as well as strongly developed Timurid architecture, best represented by the famous Blue Mosque in Mazar-i-Sharif with its turquoise tilework, iwans, and geometric ornamentation. Elements of Seljuk, Ghaznavid, and later Central Asian styles are also present in mausoleums, caravanserais, and old city structures across the region. Art and poetry have flourished alongside these architectural traditions, with Balkh historically known as the "Mother of Cities" in Persian literature. Local poets, calligraphers, and artisans continue traditional crafts, including miniature painting, woodwork, textile weaving, embroidery, and ceramic art.

=== Media, entertainment, and festivities ===
Media in Balkh is concentrated in Mazar-i-Sharif, with local radio and TV stations, national broadcasters, and growing social media use. Radio remains the main source of information in rural areas, while television and the internet are more influential in urban centers. Public entertainment traditionally revolved around seasonal and religious festivities, including Nowruz, Eid al-Fitr, and Eid al-Adha, often celebrated with music, dance, and communal gatherings, as well as weddings, circumcision ceremonies, and harvest festivals. Since 2021, restrictions under the Taliban administration have significantly limited public celebrations, music performances, and mixed-gender events, altering traditional cultural life. Print media continues in a limited form, mainly as local newspapers and religious publications. Overall, cultural and entertainment activities persist but under tighter social and political controls.

=== Places of interest ===
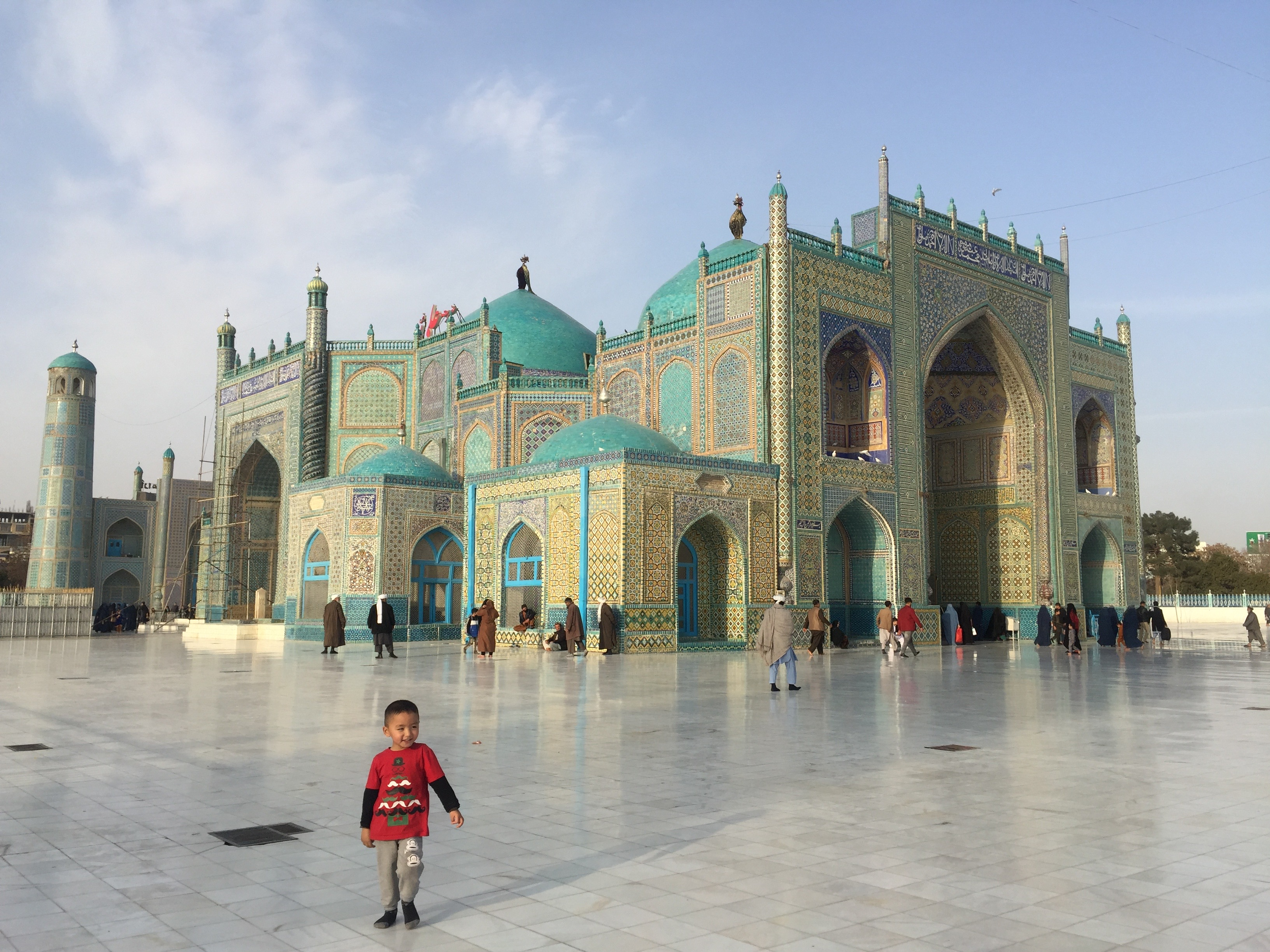
The Shrine of Hazrat Ali in Mazar-i-Sharif is widely regarded as the most famous sight in Afghanistan

Balkh hosts a number of significant historical, cultural, and natural sites. The Blue Mosque in Mazar-i-Sharif is a prominent religious and architectural landmark. The ruins near the city of Balkh, including remnants of pre-Islamic and Islamic structures, reflect the province's historical role as a major cultural and commercial center. Sholgara and other areas offer natural attractions, such as river valleys and verdant landscapes, which are popular destinations for domestic tourism. Additional notable sites include the Bactria–Margiana archaeological complex, the Shrine of Khwaja Abu Nasr Parsa (also known as the "Green Mosque"), and historic caravanserais along former trade routes. These sites collectively illustrate the rich cultural heritage of Balkh.

=== Sports ===
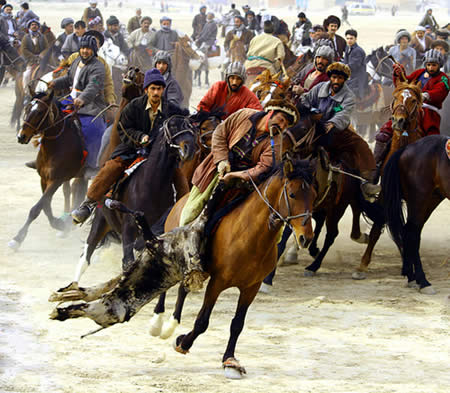
Balkhi men playing the traditional Afghan national sport of buzkashi

Traditional sports in Balkh reflect the province's cultural heritage, with games such as buzkashi—a horseback game involving a goat carcass—being particularly popular in rural and mountainous areas. Wrestling and martial arts like traditional kurash have also long-standing local traditions. Modern sports, including football and cricket, have gained popularity in recent decades. The provincial capital, Mazar-i-Sharif, hosts several sports facilities and stadiums that accommodate both professional and recreational activities. During the period of the Islamic Republic, Balkh was represented in national football competitions through Simorgh Alborz FC, which served as the regional team for Balkh together with Samangan, Sar-e Pol, Jowzjan and Faryab in the Afghan Premier League. In national cricket competitions such as the Shpageeza Cricket League, Balkh is represented as part of the Amo Sharks franchise, which covers the northeastern provinces, playing in the Balkh Cricket Stadium in Mazar-i-Sharif.

== Notable people ==
=== Historical figures ===
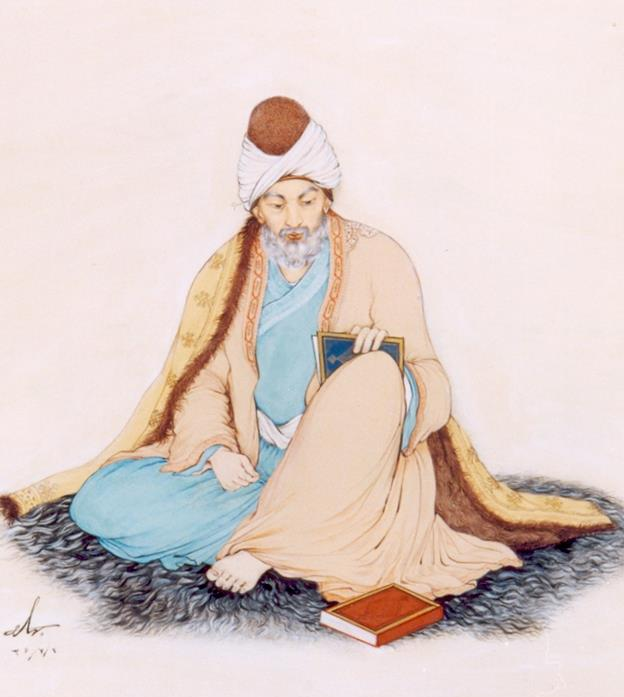
Rumi, by far the most influential figure of Sufi Islam and Persian literature

- Ibrahim ibn Adham, 8th-century Sufi saint
- Avicenna, 11th-century influential philosopher and physician of the Muslim world
- Abu Ma'shar al-Balkhi, 9th-century Persian Muslim astrologer
- Abu Zayd al-Balkhi, 9th-century Persian Muslim polymath
- Khalid ibn Barmak, 8th-century member of the Barmakids
- Ahmad ibn Nizam al-Mulk, 12th-century Persian vizier of the Seljuq Empire and Abbasid Caliphate
- Taj ad-Din an-Nahwi, 15th-century Islamic scholar and grammarian of the Arabic language
- Saman Khuda, 8th-century noble and ancestor of the rulers of the Samanid Empire
- Rumi, 13th-century mystic, poet, and founder of the Sufi Mevlevi Order
- Ismail Samani, 9th-century Samanid amir of Transoxiana and Khorasan
- Muqatil ibn Sulayman, 8th-century Muslim scholar
- Trapusa and Bahalika, first disciples of the Buddha from around the 5th century
- Unsuri, 11th-century Persian poet

=== Modern figures ===
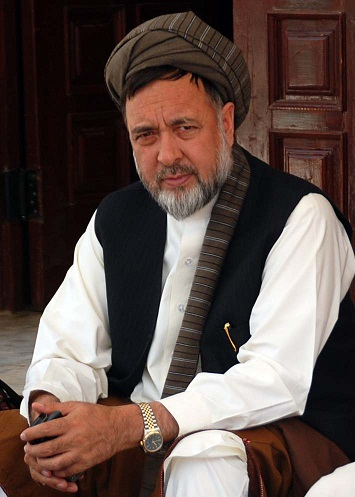
Mohammad Mohaqiq, influential politician and warlord during the 40-year war in Afghanistan

- Mosawer Ahadi, national football player
- Sayed Hussain Alimi Balkhi, Afghan Politician
- Sayed Makhdoom Raheen, Afghan Diplomat
- Sediqa Balkhi, politician and former minister
- Husn Banu Ghazanfar, politician and former minister
- Juma Khan Hamdard, politician and former governor
- Omran Haydary, national football player
- Noor Husin, national football player
- Sayed Mohammad Ali Jawid, politician and former minister
- Wazir Akbar Khan, former Emir of Afghanistan
- Abdur Rahman Khan, former Emir of Afghanistan
- Abdul Ali Mazari, politician and co-founder of Hezb-e Wahdat
- Abdullah Mazari, national cricket player
- Mohammad Mohaqiq, politician and co-founder of Hezb-e Wahdat
- Omid Musawi, national football player
- Delbar Nazari, politician and former minister
- Farshad Noor, national football player
