= Safi =

Safi may refer to:

== People ==
- Safi (given name), an Arabic name
- Safi al-Din, Arabic compound given name
- Safi (tribe), tribe of Afghanistan
- Abdulfatah Safi (born 1981), French footballer
- Abdulwahab Al-Safi (born 1984), Bahraini footballer
- Ahmad al-Safi al-Najafi (1897–1977), Iraqi poet
- Ahmed Safi Abdullah (born 1998), Pakistani cricketer
- Ahmed Al Safi (born 1971), Iraqi artist
- Ali Safi Golpaygani (1913–2010), Iranian Grand Ayatollah
- Ann El Safi, Sudanese journalist, writer and engineer
- Farouk El Safi, Egyptian musician
- Fatima Al Safi (born 1981), Kuwaiti actress
- Frozan Safi (1992–2021), Afghan activist
- Ghulam Hassan Safi (1902–1984), Afghan politician and diplomat
- Hanifa Safi (died 2012), Afghan politician
- Hasina Safi (born 1974), Afghan politician and activist
- Hazim J. Safi (born 1946), Iraqi physician and medical researcher
- Ibrahim Safi (1898–1983), Azerbaijani painter
- Ilyaz Safi (born 1999), Belarusian footballer
- Izatullah Safi (born 1978), Afghan cricket umpire
- Jawid Safi, Afghan cricketer
- Lotfollah Safi Golpaygani (1919–2022), Iranian Grand Ayatollah
- Louay M. Safi, Syrian-American academic and activist
- Meshkatolzahra Safi (born 2004), Iranian tennis player
- Mohammed Asif Safi (1923–2009), Afghan military general
- Muhammad Idrees Khan Safi, Pakistani politician
- Mohammad Nabi Safi, Afghan politician
- Omid Safi, an Iranian-American writer
- Rahmatullah Safi (born 1948), Afghan military general
- Salaheddine Al-Safi (born 1980), Qatari sprinter
- Saleem Safi (born 1968), Pakistani journalist and television presenter
- Samah Safi Bayazid, Jordanian filmmaker
- Samar Safi-Harb, Lebanese-Canadian astrophysicist and academic
- Sana Safi (born 1989), Afghan journalist
- Shah Mahmood Safi, Afghan politician
- Suliman Safi (born 2003), Afghan cricketer
- Tayeb El-Safi (born 1954), Libyan politician
- Wadih El Safi (1921–2013), Lebanese singer and composer

== Places ==
- Ghor as-Safi or as-Safi, a town in Jordan; see Zoara
- Safi, Malta
- Safi, Morocco
  - Olympic Club de Safi, an association football club
- Safi Subdivision, Mohmand District, Khyber Pakhtunkhwa, Pakistan

== Other uses ==
- Safi Airways, an Afghan Airline based in Dubai
- Safi (medicine), an Unani herbal medicine
- Pasta Zara-Cogeas, an UCI women's cycling team formerly named Safi-Pasta Zara and variations
- SS Safi, a German cargo ship in service 1956-60
- Southeast Asia Food Inc., a former name of NutriAsia
- Safi Shayla, a halal product
