= 2015 Kazakhstan President Cup squads =

== Group A ==
=== Kazakhstan ===
Kazakhstan's 17-man squad to play in the 2015 Kazakhstan President Cup.

Coach: (Spain) Carles Martorell Baques

No.	Pos.	Player	Date of birth (age)	Club
1	GK	Adashbek Abdirazakov	1999 (age 16)	(Kazakhstan) Ordabasy
2	DF	Samat Bortay	1999 (age 16)	(Kazakhstan) Ordabasy
3	DF	Alexey Skosyrev	1999 (age 16)	(Kazakhstan) Vostok
4	DF	Talgat Kusyapov	1999 (age 16)	(Kazakhstan) Caspiy
5	DF	Batyrbek Karimov	1999 (age 16)	(Kazakhstan) Aktobe
6	MF	Zhanali Payruz	12 August 1999 (age 25)	(Kazakhstan) Astana
7	MF	Zhandos Oral	5 April 1999 (age 25)	(Kazakhstan) Shakhter
8	MF	Gavril Kan	10 January 1999 (age 26)	(Kazakhstan) Taraz
9	FW	Mukhit Zhaksylyk	1999 (age 16)	(Kazakhstan) Ordabasy
10	MF	Ruslan Irgebayev	1999 (age 16)	(Kazakhstan) Taraz
11	MF	Sultanbek Astanov	1999 (age 16)	(Kazakhstan) OSDYUSCHOR-99
12	GK	Oleg Medvedev	1999 (age 16)	(Kazakhstan) Republican Sport College
14	FW	Erkhan Talasbayev	1999 (age 16)	(Kazakhstan) FC Atyrau
15	MF	Danil Khan	1999 (age 16)	(Kazakhstan) Tobol
16	FW	Stanislav Borodin	1999 (age 16)	(Kazakhstan) Republican Sport College
17	DF	Erasyl Amanzhol	1999 (age 16)	(Kazakhstan) Atyrau
18	MF	Madi Zhakipbayev	1999 (age 16)	(Kazakhstan) Republican Sport College
19	DF	Sagi Sovet	1999 (age 16)	(Kazakhstan) Republican Sport College
20	GK	Mukhammed Seisyn	1999 (age 16)	(Kazakhstan) Taraz
21	FW	Talgat Amanzhol	1999 (age 16)	(Kazakhstan) Bolat
22	FW	Batyr Kudayberdinov	1999 (age 16)	(Kazakhstan) Irtysh

=== Kyrgyzstan ===
Kyrgyzstan 16 man squad to play in the 2015 Kazakhstan President Cup.

Coach: (Kyrgyzstan) Samat Suymaliev

No.	Pos.	Player	Date of birth (age)	Club
1	GK	Elgard Sychev	8 January 2000 (age 25)	(Kyrgyzstan) Abdish-Ata
2	DF	Malik Aytbayev	22 May 2000 (age 24)	(Kyrgyzstan) Abdish-Ata
3	DF	Amantur Shamurzaev	25 January 2000 (age 25)	(Kyrgyzstan) Dordoi
4	DF	Maksat Zhakybaliyev	18 February 2000 (age 25)	(Kyrgyzstan) RSDYUSHOR
5	MF	Amir Zhaparov	18 August 2000 (age 24)	(Kyrgyzstan) Abdish-Ata
6	DF	Zhenishbek Sydykov	9 May 2000 (age 24)	(Kyrgyzstan) Abdish-Ata
7	FW	Orozbek Temir uulu	18 December 2000 (age 24)	(Kyrgyzstan) Abdish-Ata
8	MF	Emir Shigaybayev	21 August 2000 (age 24)	(Kyrgyzstan) Abdish-Ata Kant
9	MF	Islam Mezhitov	4 January 2000 (age 25)	(Kyrgyzstan) Dordoi Bishkek
10	MF	Zhenishbek Mamatemin uulu	9 May 2000 (age 24)	(Kyrgyzstan) Aldiyer
11	MF	Alimordon Shukurov	28 September 1999 (age 25)	(Kyrgyzstan) Abdish-Ata
12	GK	Erzhan Tokotayev	17 July 2000 (age 24)	(Kyrgyzstan) Dordoi
13	FW	Syrgabolat Orozbek uulu	22 March 2000 (age 24)	(Kyrgyzstan) Abdish-Ata
14	FW	Kamolidin Tashiyer	9 February 2000 (age 25)	(Kyrgyzstan) Abdish-Ata Kant
15	FW	Gulzhigit Borubayev	22 April 2000 (age 24)	(Kyrgyzstan) Dordoi Bishkek
17	FW	Gulzhigit Alykulov	25 November 2000 (age 24)	(Kyrgyzstan) Dordoi
18	FW	Aziret Momoshev	25 November 2000 (age 24)	(Kyrgyzstan) Dordoi

=== Spain ===
Spain 16 man squad to play in the 2015 Kazakhstan President Cup.

Coach: (Spain) Santiago Denia

No.	Pos.	Player	Date of birth (age)	Club
	GK	Adrian Lopez Garrote	9 January 1999 (age 26)	(Spain) Espanyol
	GK	Dario Ramos Pinazo	1999 (age 16)	(Spain) Real Zaragoza
	DF	Fran García	14 August 1999 (age 25)	(Spain) Real Madrid
	DF	Gorka Zabarte Moreno	9 January 1999 (age 26)	(Spain) Real Madrid
	DF	Haritz Estivariz Martinez	25 February 1999 (age 26)	(Spain) Real Sociedad
	DF	Chumi	2 March 1999 (age 26)	(Spain) Barcelona
	DF	Julen Bernaola Cuezva	29 April 1999 (age 25)	(Spain) Athletic Bilbao
	DF	Oriol Busquets	20 January 1999 (age 26)	(Spain) Barcelona
	MF	Álex Robles	8 January 1999 (age 26)	(Spain) Malaga
	MF	Alejandro Ujia Piriz	1999 (age 16)	(Spain) Real Sociedad
	MF	Manu Morlanes	12 January 1999 (age 26)	(Spain) Villareal
	MF	Paulino Miguélez	23 January 1999 (age 26)	(Spain) Real Santander
	MF	Pol Lozano	6 October 1999 (age 25)	(Spain) Espanyol
	MF	Victor San Bartolome Prieto	26 October 1999 (age 25)	(Spain) Athletic Bilbao
	FW	Álex Millán	7 November 1999 (age 25)	(Spain) Real Zaragoza
	FW	Iván Martín	14 February 1999 (age 26)	(Spain) Villareal
	FW	Jordi Mboula	16 March 1999 (age 26)	(Spain) Barcelona
	FW	Juan Cruz Aguero Nunez	27 May 1999 (age 25)	(Spain) Atlético Madrid

=== Tajikistan ===
Tajikistan 16 man squad to play in the 2015 Kazakhstan President Cup.

Coach: (Tajikistan) Zayniddin Rahimov

No.	Pos.	Player	Date of birth (age)	Club
2	DF	Sultonsho Mirzoev	4 September 2000 (age 24)	(Tajikistan) CSKA Pomir
3	DF	Vahdat Hanonov	27 May 2000 (age 24)	(Tajikistan) Istiqlol
4	DF	Huseyn Nurmatov	21 July 1992 (age 32)	(Tajikistan) CSKA Pomir
5	DF	Amir Ibragimov	15 March 2000 (age 25)	(Tajikistan) CSKA Pomir
6	MF	Zievuddin Fuzaylov	2000 (age 15)	(Tajikistan) Istiqlol
8	MF	Fariddun Nematov	4 July 2000 (age 24)	(Tajikistan) CSKA Pomir
9	MF	Islomiddin Goibov	26 February 2000 (age 25)	(Tajikistan) CSKA Pomir
10	MF	Shamsulo Zhuraev	12 March 2000 (age 25)	(Tajikistan) CSKA Pomir
11	FW	Mubinjon Muminov	25 September 2000 (age 24)	(Tajikistan) CSKA Pomir
13	FW	Ramz Amrokhonov	5 October 2000 (age 24)	(Tajikistan) CSKA Pomir
14	FW	Aslam Kamolov	11 September 2000 (age 24)	(Tajikistan) CSKA Pomir
15	DF	Abdurahim Mahmadzarifi	29 January 2001 (age 24)	(Tajikistan) CSKA Pomir
16	GK	Surodjiddin Huseynov	1 September 2000 (age 24)	(Tajikistan) Regar-TadAZ
17	FW	Avaz Kamshinov	6 July 2000 (age 24)	(Tajikistan) CSKA Pomir
18	MF	Shervona Mabatshoev	4 December 2000 (age 24)	(Tajikistan) CSKA Pomir
19	MF	Iskandar Soliev	9 June 2001 (age 23)	(Tajikistan) CSKA Pomir
20	GK	Daler Azizov	9 June 2000 (age 24)	(Tajikistan) Regar-TadAZ
21	MF	Saidmuhtor Azimov	9 June 2000 (age 24)	(Tajikistan) CSKA Pomir

== Group B ==
=== Azerbaijan ===
Azerbaijan's 17-man squad to play in the 2015 Kazakhstan President Cup.

Coach: (Azerbaijan) Tabriz Hasanov

No.	Pos.	Player	Date of birth (age)	Club
1	GK	Kamran Ibrahimov	7 June 1999 (age 25)	(Azerbaijan) Neftchi
2	DF	Elchin Asadov	3 August 1999 (age 25)	(Azerbaijan) Neftchi
3	DF	Ibrahim Gadirzade	21 March 1999 (age 25)	(Azerbaijan) Khazar
4	DF	Yusif Hasanov	30 November 1999 (age 25)	(Azerbaijan) Khazar
5	DF	Agshin Huseynov	10 June 1999 (age 25)	(Azerbaijan) Qarabag
6	FW	Pilagha Mehdiyev	25 May 1999 (age 25)	(Azerbaijan) Neftchi
7	FW	Samir Aliyev	12 March 1999 (age 26)	(Azerbaijan) Baku
8	FW	Bahadur Haziyev	26 March 1999 (age 25)	(Azerbaijan) Neftchi
9	FW	Dogukan Öksüz	25 February 1999 (age 26)	(Turkey) Trabzonspor
10	MF	Farid Nabiyev	22 July 1999 (age 25)	(Azerbaijan) Gabala
11	MF	Arziman Rizvanov	25 October 1999 (age 25)	(Azerbaijan) Sumgayit
12	GK	Mammad Huseynov	29 May 1999 (age 25)	(Azerbaijan) Qarabag
14	FW	Nadir Gasimov	27 August 1999 (age 25)	(Azerbaijan) Inter
15	MF	Jeyhun Mukhtarli	30 September 1999 (age 25)	(Azerbaijan) Inter
16	FW	Anil Cilaz	10 February 1999 (age 26)	(Germany) Eintracht Frankfurt
17	DF	Aslan Badalzade	3 October 1999 (age 25)	(Azerbaijan) Neftchi
18	MF	Javidan Gasimli	13 September 1999 (age 25)	(Azerbaijan) Gabala
19	DF	Huseyin Seyliğli	19 January 1999 (age 26)	(Turkey) Besiktas
20	GK	Shahin Zakiyev	11 June 1999 (age 25)	(Azerbaijan) AZAL
21	GK	Asim Abdullazade	3 April 1999 (age 25)	(Azerbaijan) Baku
22	MF	Metin Guler	10 September 1999 (age 25)	(Turkey) Besiktas
23	MF	Suleyman Ahmadov	25 November 1999 (age 25)	(Azerbaijan) Qarabag
24	MF	Nazim Bagirov	28 March 1999 (age 25)	(Azerbaijan) Baku
25	DF	Tural Azhdarli	20 July 1999 (age 25)	(Azerbaijan) Gabala

=== Belarus ===
Belarus's 17-man squad to play in the 2015 Kazakhstan President Cup.

Coach: (Belarus) Vladzimir Pihuleuski

No.	Pos.	Player	Date of birth (age)	Club
1	GK	Kiryl Kotau	15 June 1999 (age 25)	(Belarus) Gomel
2	DF	Andrey Pilipovets	17 February 1999 (age 26)	(Belarus) Shakhtyor Soligorsk
3	DF	Ilya Boltrushevich	30 March 1999 (age 25)	(Belarus) Dnepr Mogilev
4	DF	Pavel Fisiuk	6 February 1999 (age 26)	(Belarus) Dnepr Mogilev
5	DF	Vladzimir Starastin	9 January 1999 (age 26)	(Belarus) Shakhtyor Soligorsk
6	FW	Miraslau Khlebasolau	18 January 1999 (age 26)	(Belarus) Baranovichi
7	FW	Dmitry Kalineyko	9 April 1999 (age 25)	(Belarus) RCOP BGU
8	FW	Kiryl Pilets	5 February 1999 (age 26)	(Belarus) Neman
9	FW	Aleksandr Ksenofontov	5 May 1999 (age 25)	(Belarus) Dinamo Minsk
10	MF	Pavel Sadovskiy	17 February 1999 (age 26)	(Belarus) Dinamo Minsk
11	MF	Gleb Shevchenko	17 February 1999 (age 26)	(Belarus) Minsk
12	GK	Aliaksandar Svirski	28 February 1999 (age 26)	(Belarus) BATE Borisov
14	FW	Kanstantsin Kazakow	14 June 1999 (age 25)	(Belarus) Minsk
15	MF	Ilyaz Safi	16 March 1999 (age 26)	(Belarus) Dinamo Minsk
16	DF	Nika Basariya	21 September 1999 (age 25)	(Belarus) Dinamo Minsk
17	DF	Vladislav Malkevich	4 December 1999 (age 25)	(Belarus) BATE Borisov
18	MF	Nika Lamadze	15 April 1999 (age 25)	(Belarus) Minsk
19	DF	Yahor Lapun	21 January 1999 (age 26)	(Belarus) Minsk

=== Georgia ===
Georgia's 17-man squad to play in the 2015 Kazakhstan President Cup.

Coach: (Georgia (country)) Gocha Avsajanishvili

No.	Pos.	Player	Date of birth (age)	Club
1	GK	Luka Gugeshashvili	29 April 1999 (age 25)	(Georgia (country)) Dinamo Tbilisi
2	DF	Luka Nikoleishvili	16 August 1999 (age 25)	(Georgia (country)) Dinamo Tbilisi
3	DF	Davit Kikalishvili	19 May 1999 (age 25)	(Georgia (country)) Dinamo Tbilisi
4	DF	Giorgi Amashukeli	6 February 1999 (age 26)	(Georgia (country)) 35th Football School
5	DF	Dimitri Virubovi	3 August 1999 (age 25)	(Georgia (country)) 35th Football School
6	FW	Nugzari Spanderashvili	16 January 1999 (age 26)	(Georgia (country)) 35th Football School
7	FW	Giorgi Chakvetadze	29 August 1999 (age 25)	(Georgia (country)) Dinamo Tbilisi
8	FW	Beka Kavtaradze	15 June 1999 (age 25)	(Georgia (country)) 35th Football School
9	FW	Lasha Ozbetelashvili	20 January 1999 (age 26)	(Georgia (country)) Lokomotivi
10	MF	Goga Lursmanashvili	3 December 1999 (age 25)	(Georgia (country)) Dinamo Tbilisi
11	MF	Nika Ninua	27 October 1999 (age 25)	(Georgia (country)) Dinamo Tbilisi
12	GK	Davit Kereselidze	19 August 1999 (age 25)	(Georgia (country)) Spartaki
14	DF	Luka Asatiani	22 April 1999 (age 25)	(Georgia (country)) 35th Football School
15	MF	Vakhtang Koplatadze	10 March 1999 (age 26)	(Georgia (country)) Dinamo Tbilisi
16	DF	Jaba Kasrelishvili	18 August 1999 (age 25)	(Georgia (country)) 35th Football School
17	DF	Luka Kapianidze	10 January 1999 (age 26)	(Georgia (country)) Dinamo Tbilisi
18	MF	Giorgi Kakulia	9 May 1999 (age 25)	(Georgia (country)) Saburtalo
19	DF	Levan Kharabadze	26 January 2000 (age 25)	(Georgia (country)) Dinamo Tbilisi
20	MF	Levan Barabadze	19 January 1999 (age 26)	(Georgia (country)) 35th Football School
21	MF	Akaki Kimeridze	30 March 1999 (age 25)	(Georgia (country)) 35th Football School
22	MF	Ucha Janashia	19 May 1999 (age 25)	(Georgia (country)) Champion

=== Russia ===
Russia's 17-man squad to play in the 2015 Kazakhstan President Cup.

Coach: (Russia) Oleg Levin

No.	Pos.	Player	Date of birth (age)	Club
1	GK	Fedor Katkov	10 February 1999 (age 26)	(Russia) Torpedo
2	DF	Sergey Filippenkov	11 July 1999 (age 25)	(Russia) Spartak
3	DF	Vladislav Nakvasin	14 January 1999 (age 26)	(Russia) Torpedo
4	DF	Aleksandr Kakhidze	24 April 1999 (age 25)	(Russia) Torpedo
5	FW	Richard Aibov	8 June 1999 (age 25)	(Russia) Spartak
6	FW	Irakliy Tsaava	18 March 1999 (age 26)	(Russia) Spartak
7	FW	Saveliy Kopylov	2 October 1999 (age 25)	(Russia) Torpedo
8	MF	Nikita Rybakov	4 March 1999 (age 26)	(Russia) Spartak
9	MF	Grigoriy Topilskiy	18 January 1999 (age 26)	(Russia) Torpedo
10	GK	Leon Bater	26 February 1999 (age 26)	(Russia) Torpedo
11	MF	Bogdan Petosh	11 May 1999 (age 25)	(Russia) Torpedo
12	MF	Artur Galoyan	25 June 1999 (age 25)	(Russia) Torpedo
14		Leonid Feoktistov	7 July 1999 (age 25)	(Russia) Spartak
15		Maxim Nesterov	10 March 1999 (age 26)	(Russia) Torpedo
16		Sergey Vladimirov	27 April 1999 (age 25)	(Russia) Torpedo
17		Nikita Volkov	11 March 1999 (age 26)	(Russia) Torpedo
