= Mazar-i-Sharif =

Mazar-i-Sharif مزار شریف
- Provincial capital
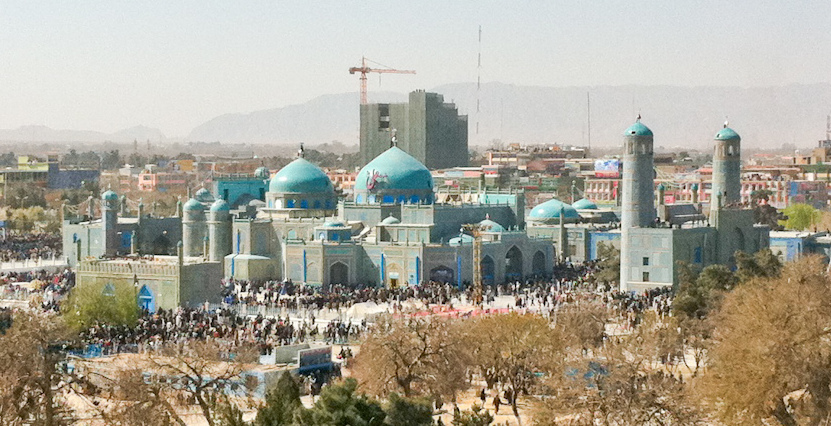
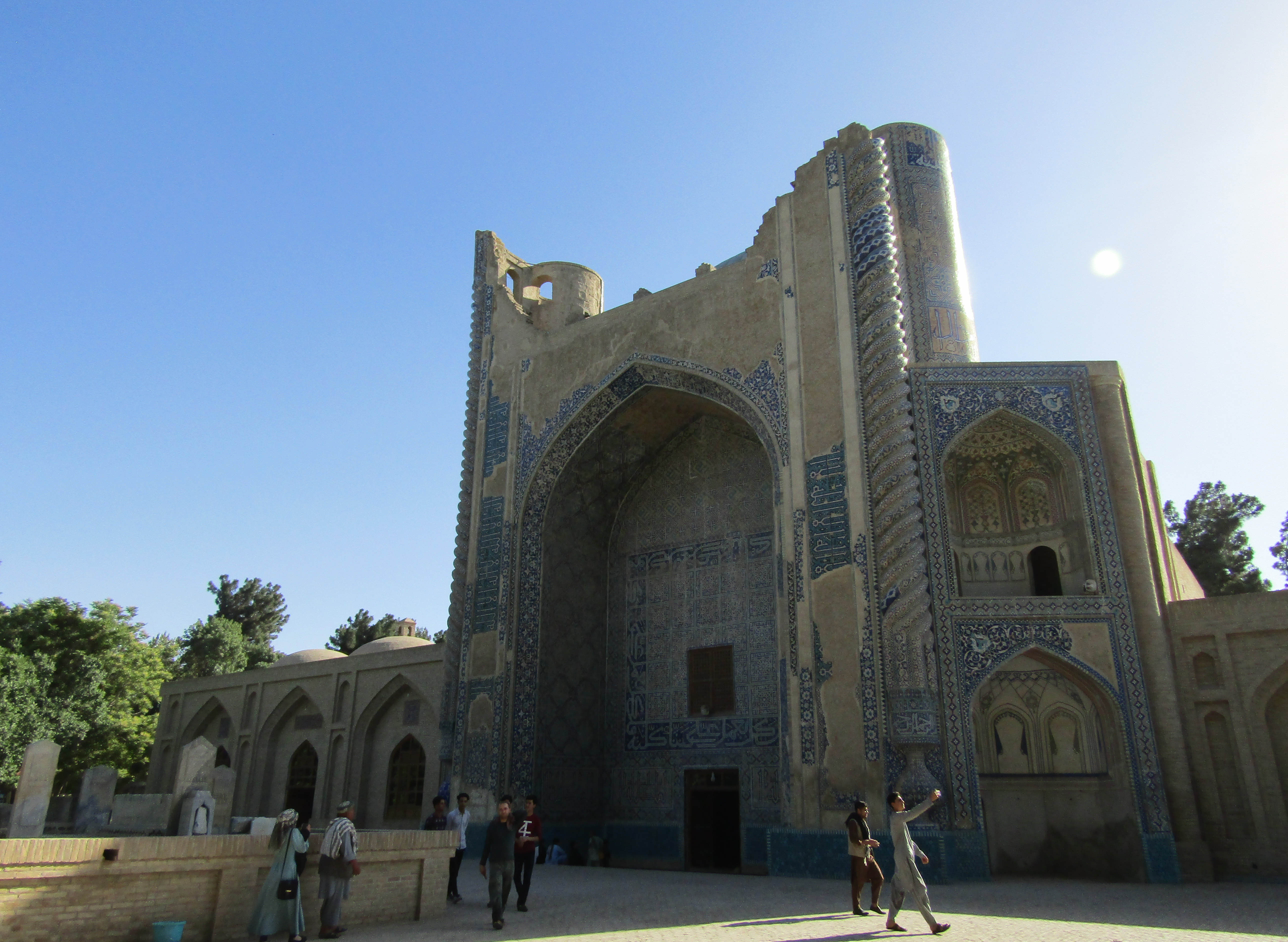
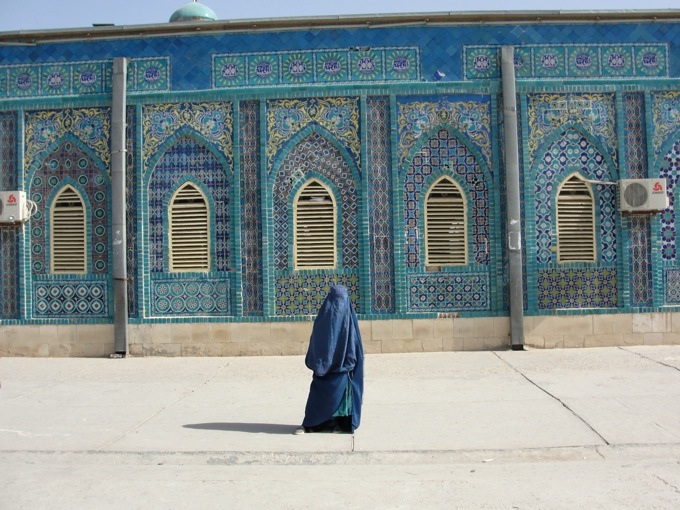
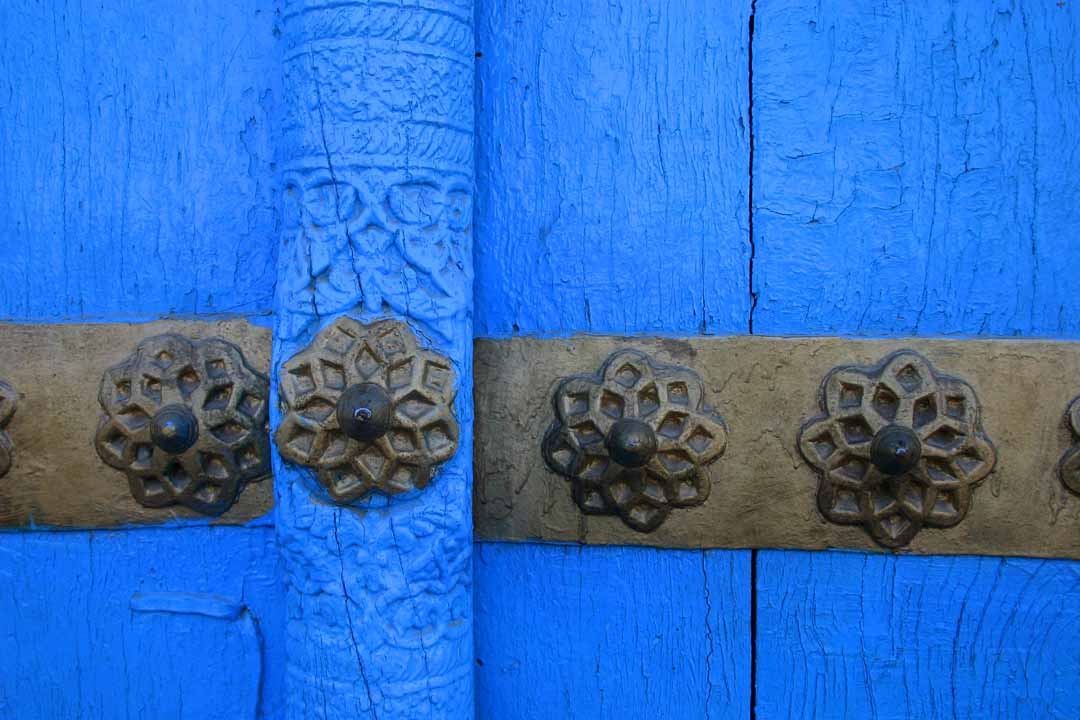
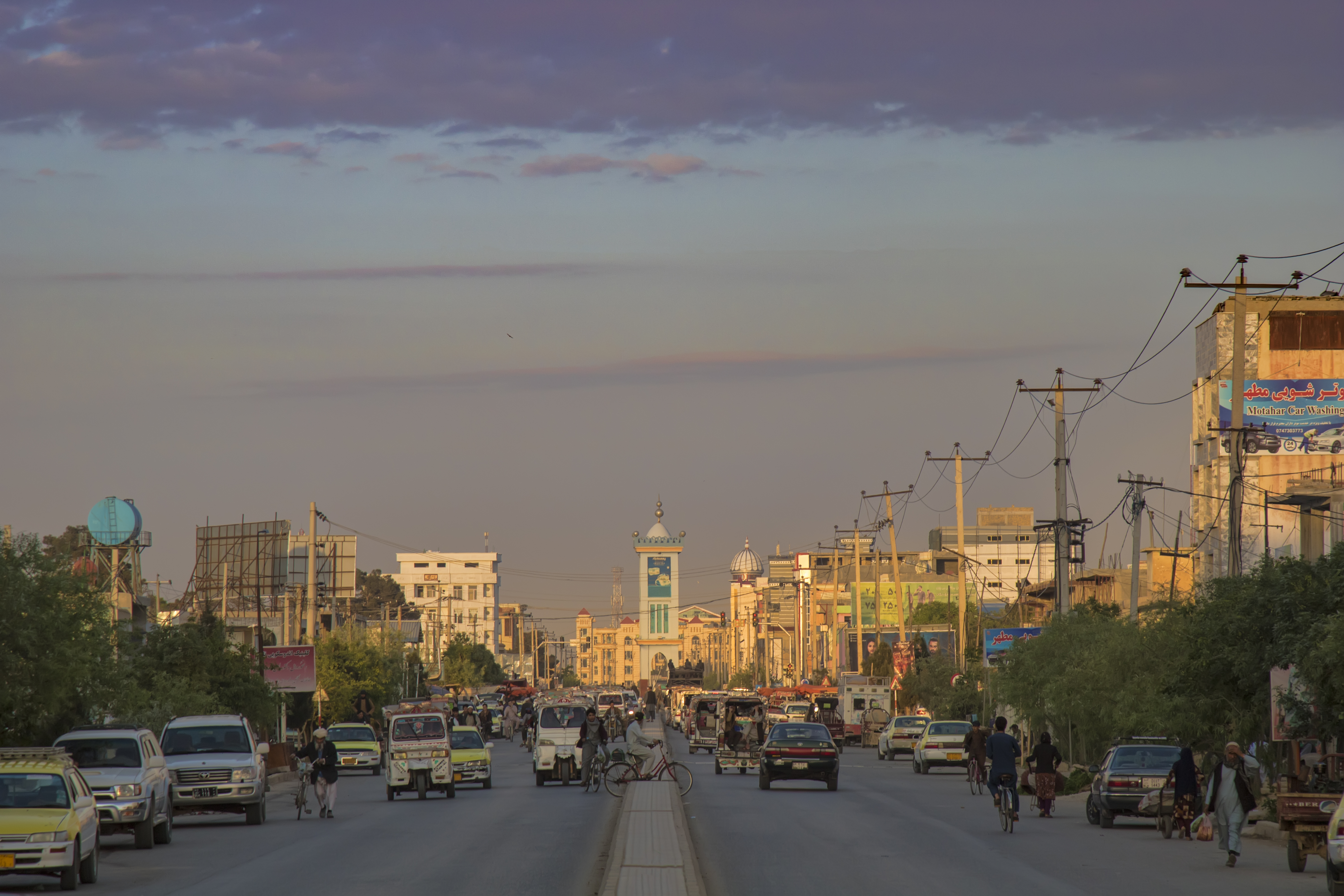
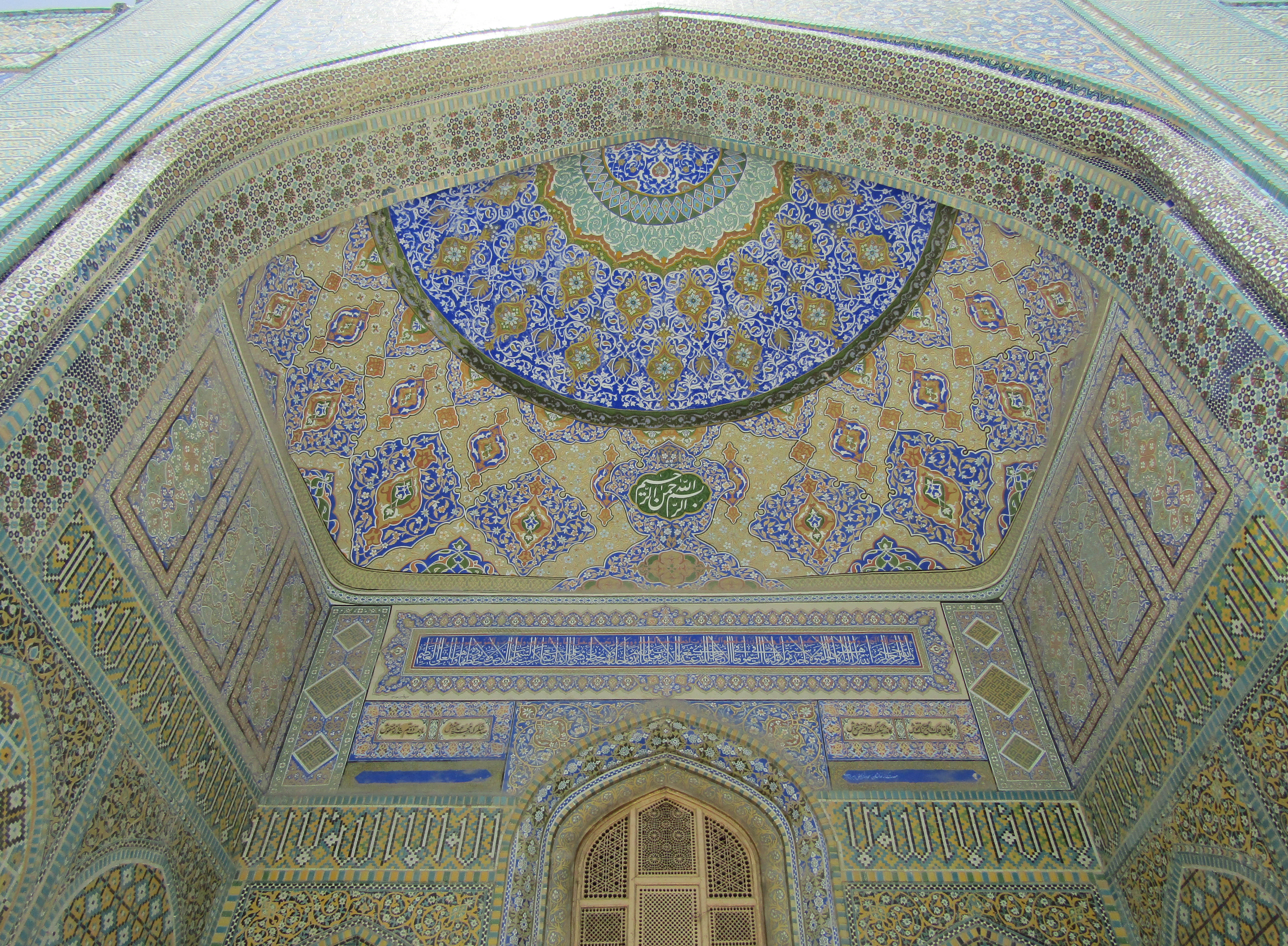

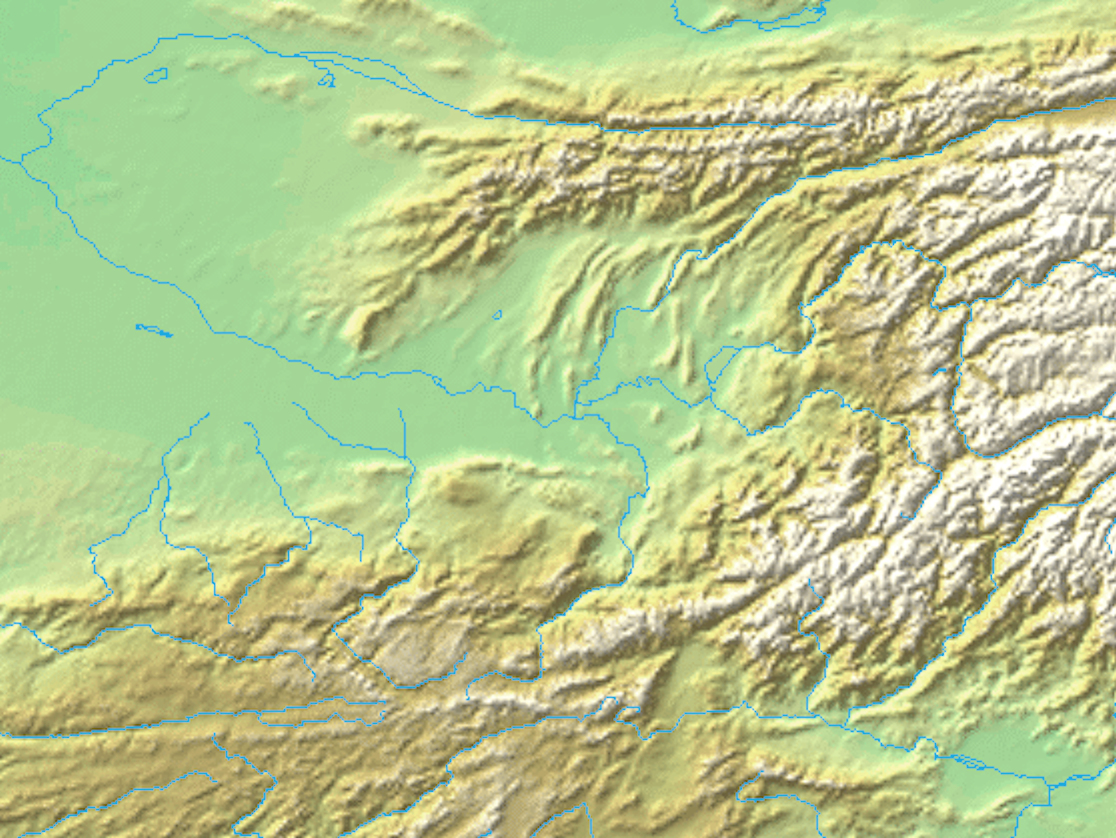
- Location in Afghanistan Mazar-i-Sharif (Bactria) Mazar-i-Sharif (West and Central Asia)
- Coordinates: 36°42′N 67°07′E
- Country: Afghanistan
- Province: Balkh
- District: Nahri Shahi

Government
  - Type: Municipality
  - Mayor: Hafiz Abdul Rahman Himat

Area
  - Land: 83 km^{2} (32 sq mi)
- Elevation: 357 m (1,171 ft)

Population (2025)
  - Provincial capital: 568,013
  - Density: 6,800/km^{2} (18,000/sq mi)
  - Urban: 568,013
- Time zone: UTC+04:30 (Afghanistan Time)
- ISO 3166 code: AF-MZR
- Climate: BSk
- Website: mazar-m.gov.af

Mazar-i-Sharif or Mazar-e-Sharif (Note: /məˈzæri ʃəˈriːf/, mə-ZARR-ee shə-REEF) (Note: Pashto: مزار شريف, romanized: Mazār Šarif [ma.zɑ'ɾi ʃa.ɾip]; Dari: مزار شریف, romanized: Mazār-i Šarīf [mä.zɑ́ː.ɾɪ ʃä.ɾíːf]) is a city in northern Afghanistan, serving as the capital and largest city of Balkh Province. It has 12 city districts (nahias) and an estimated population of 568,013 people. Hafiz Abdul Rahman Himat is the current mayor of the city. His predecessor was Mohammad Kazim Tariq.

Mazar-i-Sharif is home to the Mausoleum of Imam Ali. The city has long been a tourist destination because of its famous shrines as well as the Islamic and Hellenistic archeological sites. The city is also home to the Mawlana Jalaluddin Mohammad Balkhi International Airport and Balkh University. It is linked by a road network with Hairatan to the north, Kunduz to the east, Aybak to the southeast, Bamyan to the south, and Sheberghan to the west. It is about 55 km (34 mi) to the south from the Afghanistan–Uzbekistan border. The ancient city of Balkh is about 25 km (16 mi) slightly to the northwest of Mazar-i-Sharif.

The region around Mazar-i-Sharif has been historically part of Greater Khorasan and was controlled by the Tahirids followed by the Saffarids, Samanids, Ghaznavids, Ghurids, Ilkhanids, Timurids, and Khanate of Bukhara until 1751 when it became part of the Durrani Empire.

Mazar-i-Sharif is the regional hub of northern Afghanistan, located in close proximity to Termez in Uzbekistan and the Khatlon Region of Tajikistan. It has the highest percentage of built-up land (91%) of all the Afghan provincial capitals, and it has additional built-up area extending beyond the municipal boundary but forming a part of the larger urban area. It is also the lowest-lying major city in the country, about 357 m (1,171 ft) above sea level. Although the city was mostly spared from the devastation that occurred in Afghanistan's other major cities during the Soviet–Afghan War and subsequent civil war, it was regarded in 2020 as one of the dangerous cities in the country.

On 14 August 2021, Mazar-i-Sharif was seized by Taliban fighters, becoming the 25th provincial capital to be captured by the Taliban as part of the wider 2021 Taliban offensive.

== Etymology ==
The name Mazar-i-Sharif means "tomb of the saint", a reference to the purported tomb of Ali, cousin, son-in-law and companion of the Islamic prophet Muhammad. The tomb is housed in the large, blue-tiled sanctuary and mosque in the center of the city known as the Shrine of Ali or the Blue Mosque.

== History ==
=== Ancient period ===
The Achaemenids controlled the region from the sixth century BCE. Alexander the Great conquered the area but it was then incorporated into the Seleucid Empire after his death. The decline of the Seleucids consequently led to the emergence of the Greco-Bactrian kingdom. Around 130 BCE, the Sakas occupied the region and the Greco-Bactrian kingdom fell. The Yuezhi took Mazar-i-Sharif and the surrounding area which led to the creation of the Kushan Empire. The Sasanians subsequently controlled the area after the fall of the Kushans. The Islamic conquests reached Mazar-i-Sharif in 651 CE.

=== 9th century until 1919 ===
The region around Mazar-i-Sharif has been historically part of Greater Khorasan and was controlled by the Tahirids followed by the Saffarids, Samanids, Ghaznavids, Ghurids, Ilkhanids, Timurids, and Khanate of Bukhara.

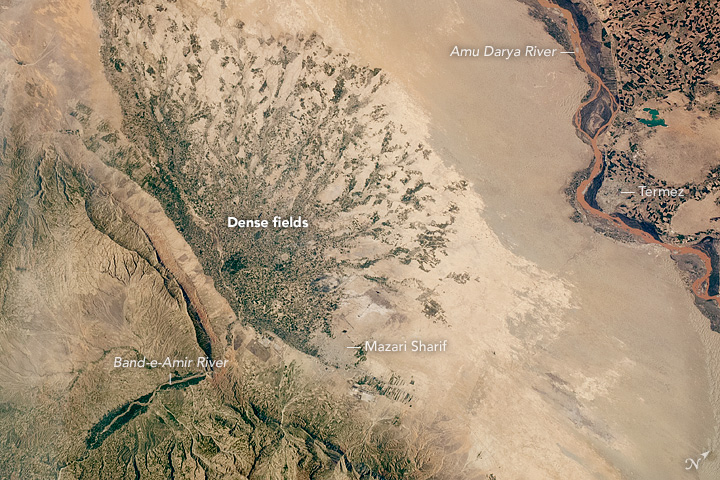
Mazar-i-Sharif & surroundings from ISS, 2016

The poet Jalal al-Din Rumi was born somewhere in this area. His father Baha' Walad was descended from the first caliph Abu Bakr.

The Seljuk sultan Ahmed Sanjar ordered a city and shrine to be built on the location, which was later destroyed by Genghis Khan and his Mongol army in the 13th century, and then rebuilt. During the nineteenth century, due to the absence of drainage systems and the weak economy of the region, the excess water of this area flooded many acres of the land in the vicinity of residential areas causing a malaria epidemic in the region. The ruler of North Central Afghanistan decided to move the capital to Mazar-i-Sharif.

The city along with the region south of the Amu Darya became part of the Durrani Empire in around 1751. For the most part the region was controlled by autonomous Uzbek rulers. After the Bukharan-Durrani war of 1788–1790, Qilich Ali Beg of Khulm formed a mini-empire stretching from Balkh to Aybak, Saighan, Kahmard, Darra-i Suf, and Qunduz. When he died in 1817, the Balkh and Mazar-i Sharif region became an independent city state with Aqcha as its dependency. In November 1837 the Bukharans conquered the city but Balkh was still able to retain autonomy. In 1849 the city was conquered and annexed into Afghanistan.

=== Late 20th century ===
During the 1980s Soviet–Afghan War, Mazar-i-Sharif was a strategic base for the Soviet Army as they used its airport to launch air strikes on mujahideen rebels. Mazar-i-Sharif was also the main city that linked to Soviet territory in the north, especially the roads leading to the Uzbek Soviet Socialist Republic. As a garrison for the Soviet-backed Afghan Army, the city was under the command of General Abdul Rashid Dostum. Mujahideen militias Hezbe Wahdat and Jamiat-e Islami both attempted to contest the city but were repelled by the Army. Dostum mutinied against Mohammad Najibullah's government on March 19, 1992, shortly before its collapse, and formed his new party and militia, Junbish-e Milli. The party took over the city the next day. Afterwards Mazar-i-Sharif became the de facto capital of a relatively stable and secular proto-state in northern Afghanistan under the rule of Dostum. The city remained peaceful and prosperous, whilst rest of the nation disintegrated and was slowly taken over by fundamentalist Taliban forces. The city was called at the time a "glittering jewel in Afghanistan's battered crown". Money rolled in from foreign donors Russia, Turkey, newly independent Uzbekistan and others, with whom Dostum had established close relations. He printed his own currency for the region and established his own airline. The city remained relatively liberal as Kabul previously was, where activities such as coeducational schools and betting was legal as opposed to the Taliban dominated regions in the south of the country.

This peace was shattered in May 1997 when he was betrayed by one of his generals, warlord Abdul Malik Pahlawan who allied himself with the Taliban, forcing him to flee from Mazar-i-Sharif as the Taliban were getting ready to take the city through Pahlawan. Afterwards Pahlawan himself mutinied the Taliban on the deal and it was reported that between May and July 1997 that Pahlawan executed thousands of Taliban members, that he personally did many of the killings by slaughtering the prisoners as a revenge for the 1995 death of Abdul Ali Mazari. "He is widely believed to have been responsible for the brutal massacre of up to 3,000 Taliban prisoners after inviting them into Mazar-i-Sharif." Several of the Taliban escaped the slaughtering and reported what had happened. Meanwhile, Dostum came back and took the city again from Pahlawan.

However the Taliban retaliated in 1998 attacking the city and killing an estimated 8,000 non-combatants. At 10 am on 8 August 1998, the Taliban entered the city and for the next two days drove their pickup trucks "up and down the narrow streets of Mazar-i-Sharif shooting to the left and right and killing everything that moved—shop owners, cart pullers, women and children shoppers and even goats and donkeys." More than 8000 noncombatants were reported killed in Mazar-i-Sharif and later in Bamiyan. In addition, the Taliban were criticized for forbidding anyone from burying the corpses for the first six days (contrary to the injunctions of Islam, which demands immediate burial) while the remains rotted in the summer heat and were eaten by dogs. The Taliban also reportedly sought out and massacred members of the Hazara, while in control of Mazar.

=== Since 2001 ===
Following the September 11 attacks in 2001, Mazar-i-Sharif was the first Afghan city to fall to the U.S.-backed Afghan military alliance, Northern Alliance (United Front). The Taliban's defeat in Mazar quickly turned into a rout from the rest of the north and west of Afghanistan. After the Battle of Mazar-i-Sharif in November 2001, the city was officially captured by forces of the Northern Alliance. They were joined by the United States Special Operations Forces and supported by U.S. Air Force aircraft. After this battle, the Northern Alliance advanced towards the city of Kunduz, which was the last remaining Taliban stronghold in northern Afghanistan. The siege of the city lasted two weeks with the city being captured on November 25. Around 8,000 Taliban fighters were captured. They were taken to Mazar-i-Sharif and then to Sheberghan prison in Jowzjan Province. Between 400 and 3,000 prisoners were reportedly massacred by the Northern Alliance during the journey and buried in mass graves in the Dasht-e Leili desert west of Sheberghan.

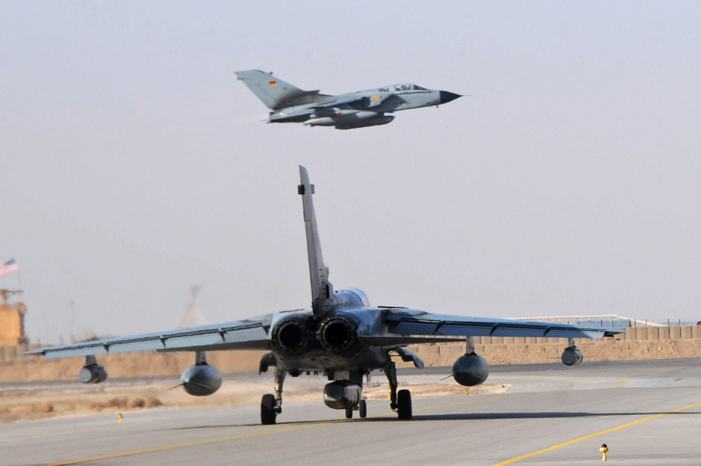
Camp Marmal, located south of the city next to Mazar-i-Sharif Airport

The city slowly came under the control of the Karzai administration after 2002, which is led by President Hamid Karzai. The 209th Corps (Shaheen) of the Afghan National Army is based at Mazar-i-Sharif, which provides military assistance to northern Afghanistan. The Afghan Border Police headquarters for the Northern Zone is also located in the city. Despite the security put in place, there are reports of Taliban activities and assassinations of tribal elders. Officials in Mazar-i-Sharif reported that between 20 and 30 Afghan tribal elders have been assassinated in Balkh Province in the last several years. There is no conclusive evidence as to who is behind it but majority of the victims are said to have been associated with the Hezb-i Islami political party.

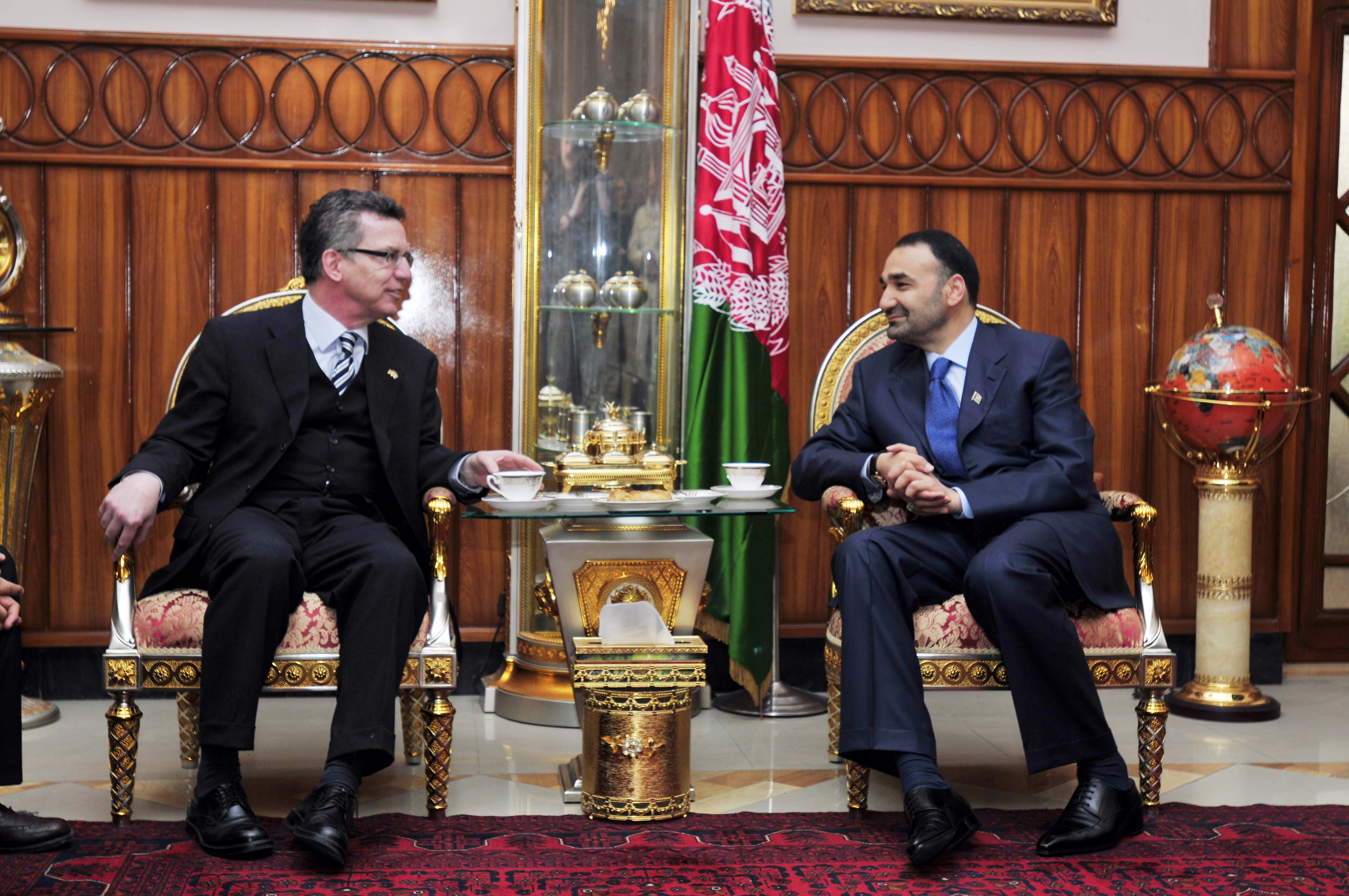
Thomas de Maizière, German Minister of Defense, with Balkh Governor Atta Muhammad Nur in 2010

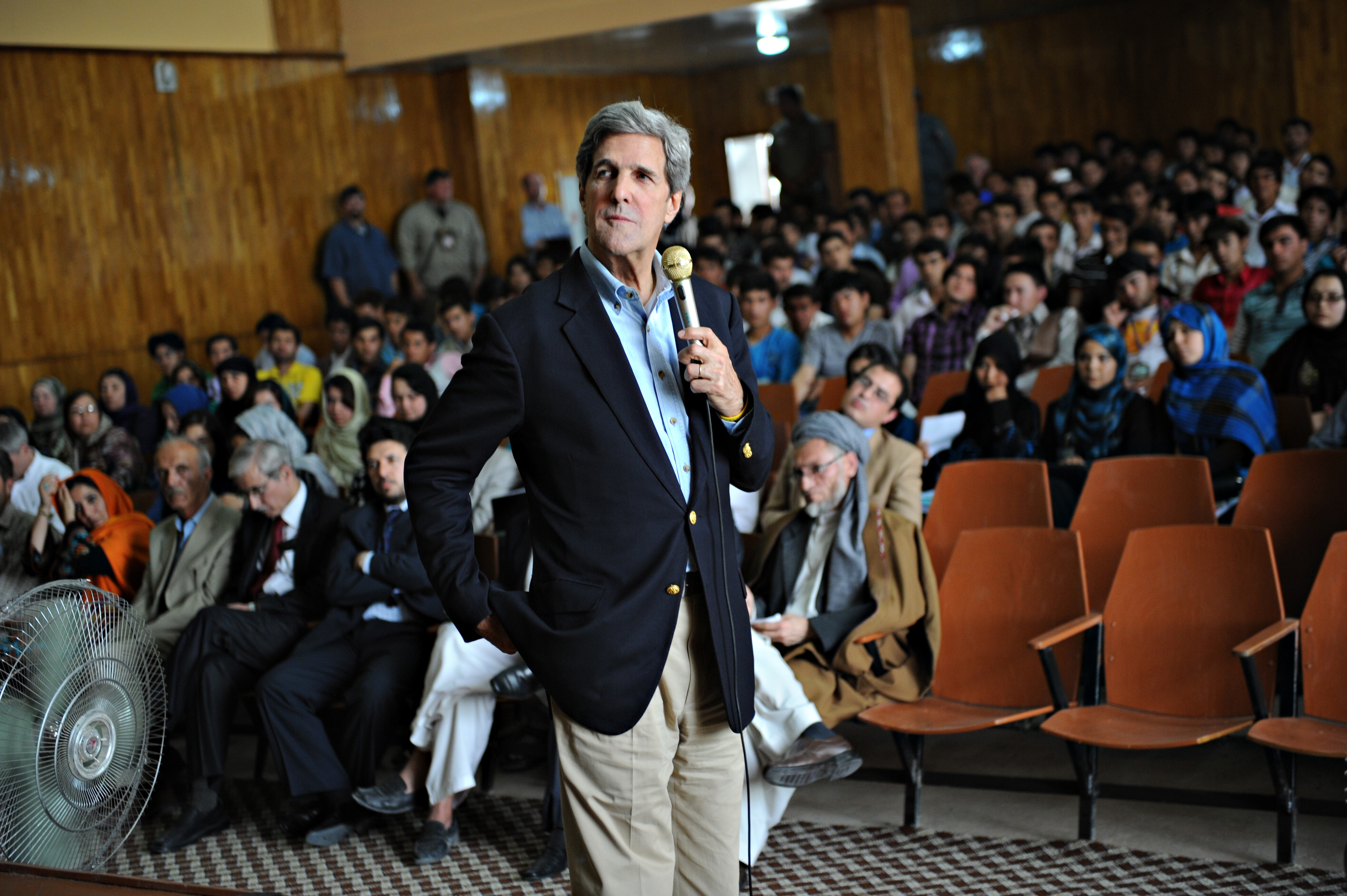
U.S. Senator John Kerry at Balkh University in May 2011

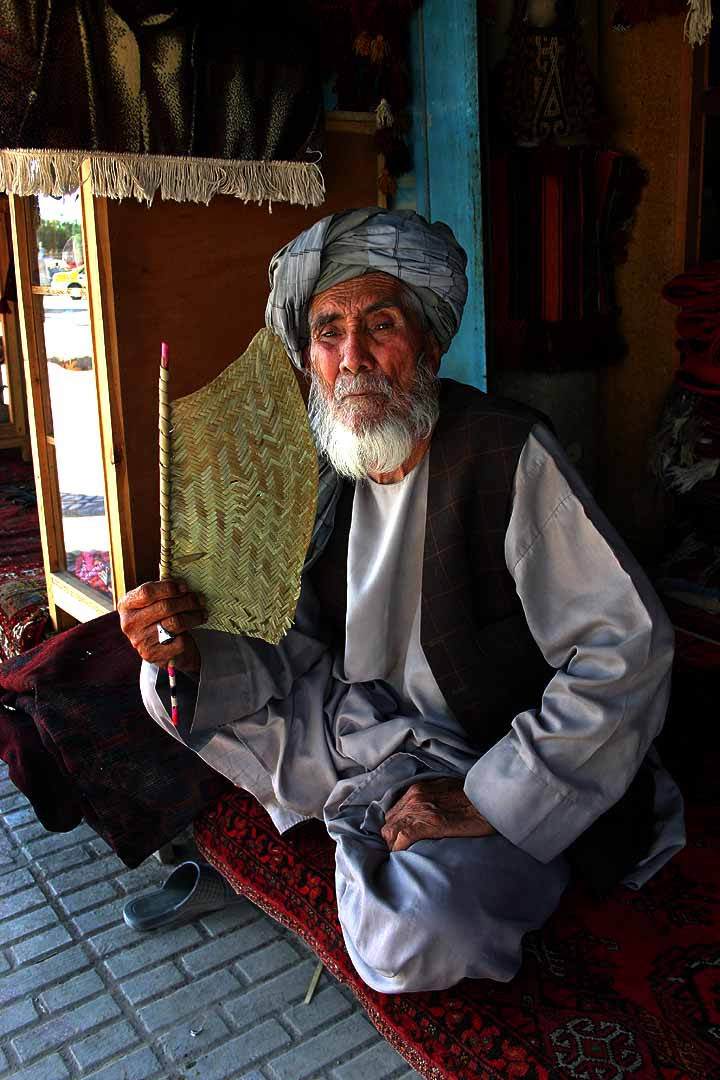
A carpet seller in Mazar

Small-scale clashes between militias belonging to different commanders persisted throughout 2002, and were the focus of intensive UN peace-brokering and small arms disarmament programme. After some pressure, an office of the Afghan Independent Human Rights Commission opened an office in Mazar in April 2003. There were reports about northern Pashtun civilians being ethnically cleansed by the other groups, mainly by ethnic Tajiks, Hazaras and Uzbeks.

NATO-led peacekeeping forces in and around the city provided assistance to the Afghan government. ISAF Regional Command North, led by Germany, is stationed at Camp Marmal which lies next to Mazar-i-Sharif Airport. Since 2006, Provincial Reconstruction Team Mazar-i-Sharif had unit commanders from Sweden on loan to ISAF. The unit is stationed at Camp Northern Lights which is located ten km (six mi) west of Camp Marmal. Camp Nidaros, located within Camp Marmal, has soldiers from Latvia and Norway and is led by an ISAF-officer from Norway.

In 2006, the discovery of new Hellenistic remains was announced.

On April 1, 2011, ten foreign employees working for United Nations Assistance Mission in Afghanistan (UNAMA) were killed by angry demonstrators in the city. The demonstration was organized in retaliation to pastors Terry Jones and Wayne Sapp's March 21 Qur'an-burning in Florida, United States. Among the dead were five Nepalis, a Norwegian, Romanian and Swedish nationals, two of them were said to be decapitated. Terry Jones, the American pastor who was going to burn Islam's Holy Book, denied his responsibility for incitement. President Barack Obama strongly condemned both the Quran burning, calling it an act of "extreme intolerance and bigotry", and the "outrageous" attacks by protesters, referring to them as "an affront to human decency and dignity." "No religion tolerates the slaughter and beheading of innocent people, and there is no justification for such a dishonorable and deplorable act." U.S. legislators, including Senate Majority Leader Harry Reid, also condemned both the burning and the violence in reaction to it.

By July 2011 violence grew to a record high in the insurgency. In late July 2011, NATO troops also handed control of Mazar-i-Sharif to local forces amid rising security fears just days after it was hit by a deadly bombing. Mazar-i-Sharif is the sixth of seven areas to transition to Afghan control, but critics say the timing is political and there is skepticism over Afghan abilities to combat the Taliban insurgency.

On 10 November 2016, a suicide attacker rammed a truck bomb into the wall of the German consulate in Mazar-i-Sharif. Eight people were killed and more than a hundred others were injured.

On 21 April 2017, a coordinated Taliban attack killed more than 100 people at Camp Shaheen, the Afghan Army base in Mazar-i-Sharif.

In November 2018, Voice of America reported that 40 houses in Qazil Abad, an immediate suburb of Mazar-i-Sharif, used unexploded Soviet Grad surface-to-surface rockets as construction materials. As a result, several people were killed and wounded from explosions over the years. These rockets, left behind by the Soviet Army in 1989 at the end of the Soviet–Afghan War, were used as cheap building materials by the poor residents of the village. It was estimated that over 400 rockets were incorporated into the village as wall and ceiling beams, door-stoppers, and even footbridges used by children. When the rest of the world discovered this fact, the Danish demining group of the Danish Refugee Council visited the village and, after asking the residents, began demining and rebuilding the village, safely removing and disposing of the rockets through controlled detonation at the border with Uzbekistan.

President Ashraf Ghani visited the city on 11 August 2021 to rally local warlords to fight the Taliban. On 14 August, the Taliban captured Mazar-i-Sharif along with Sharana and Asadabad, the provincial capitals of Paktika and Kunar provinces respectively. Local government forces and regional leaders Abdul Rashid Dostum and Atta Mohammad Noor fled to neighboring Uzbekistan.

On 21 April 2022, Islamic State – Khorasan Province killed 31 people by bombing a Shia mosque. A week later, 11 people were killed in a double bombing. On March 9, 2023, the Taliban-appointed Governor of Balkh, Daud Muzamil, was killed in a bomb blast.

Mazar-i-Sharif is also known for the Afghan song Bia ke berem ba Mazar (Come let's go to Mazar) by Sarban.

== Geography ==
Mazar-i-Sharif is located in northern Afghanistan, serving as the capital and largest city of Balkh Province. It is situated at an elevation of approximately 357 m (1,171 ft) above sea level, and connected by a road network with Hairatan to the north, Kunduz to the east, Kabul to the southeast, Bamyan to the south, and Herat to the southwest. Mazar-i-Sharif is administratively divided into 12 city districts (nahias), covering a land area of 83 km^{2} (32 sq mi) or 8,304 ha (20,520 acres).

=== Climate ===
Mazar-i-Sharif has a cold steppe climate (Köppen climate classification BSk) with hot summers and cold winters. Precipitation is low and mostly falls between December and April. The climate in Mazar-i-Sharif is very hot during the summer with daily temperatures of over 40 °C (104 °F) from June to August. The winters are cold with temperatures falling below freezing; it may snow from November through March.

Climate data for Mazar-i-Sharif
Month	Jan	Feb	Mar	Apr	May	Jun	Jul	Aug	Sep	Oct	Nov	Dec	Year
Record high °C (°F)	24.0 (75.2)	28.6 (83.5)	32.4 (90.3)	37.8 (100.0)	43.0 (109.4)	45.6 (114.1)	48.1 (118.6)	46.0 (114.8)	39.5 (103.1)	37.0 (98.6)	29.8 (85.6)	24.4 (75.9)	48.1 (118.6)
Mean daily maximum °C (°F)	8.0 (46.4)	10.7 (51.3)	16.3 (61.3)	24.3 (75.7)	31.2 (88.2)	37.0 (98.6)	38.9 (102.0)	36.9 (98.4)	31.9 (89.4)	24.7 (76.5)	16.4 (61.5)	10.8 (51.4)	23.9 (75.1)
Daily mean °C (°F)	2.6 (36.7)	5.1 (41.2)	10.8 (51.4)	17.9 (64.2)	24.5 (76.1)	29.9 (85.8)	33.3 (91.9)	29.9 (85.8)	23.9 (75.0)	16.7 (62.1)	9.1 (48.4)	5.1 (41.2)	17.4 (63.3)
Mean daily minimum °C (°F)	−2.1 (28.2)	0.0 (32.0)	5.1 (41.2)	11.3 (52.3)	16.6 (61.9)	22.5 (72.5)	25.9 (78.6)	23.8 (74.8)	17.1 (62.8)	9.4 (48.9)	3.2 (37.8)	0.0 (32.0)	11.1 (51.9)
Record low °C (°F)	−22.3 (−8.1)	−24.0 (−11.2)	−6.1 (21.0)	−0.8 (30.6)	1.0 (33.8)	11.4 (52.5)	11.1 (52.0)	13.7 (56.7)	2.6 (36.7)	4.5 (40.1)	−8.7 (16.3)	−15.5 (4.1)	−24.0 (−11.2)
Average precipitation mm (inches)	28.9 (1.14)	34.8 (1.37)	43.8 (1.72)	28.3 (1.11)	11.2 (0.44)	0.2 (0.01)	0.0 (0.0)	0.0 (0.0)	0.1 (0.00)	3.9 (0.15)	13.5 (0.53)	21.7 (0.85)	186.4 (7.32)
Average rainy days	4	7	10	9	4	0	0	0	0	2	4	6	46
Average snowy days	4	3	1	0	0	0	0	0	0	0	0	2	10
Average relative humidity (%)	79	77	72	64	44	27	25	24	28	41	62	75	52
Mean monthly sunshine hours	122.2	118.4	158.1	193.8	299.9	352.9	364.4	332.7	298.2	223.2	173.6	125.5	2,762.9
Source: NOAA (1959–1983)

== Demographics ==
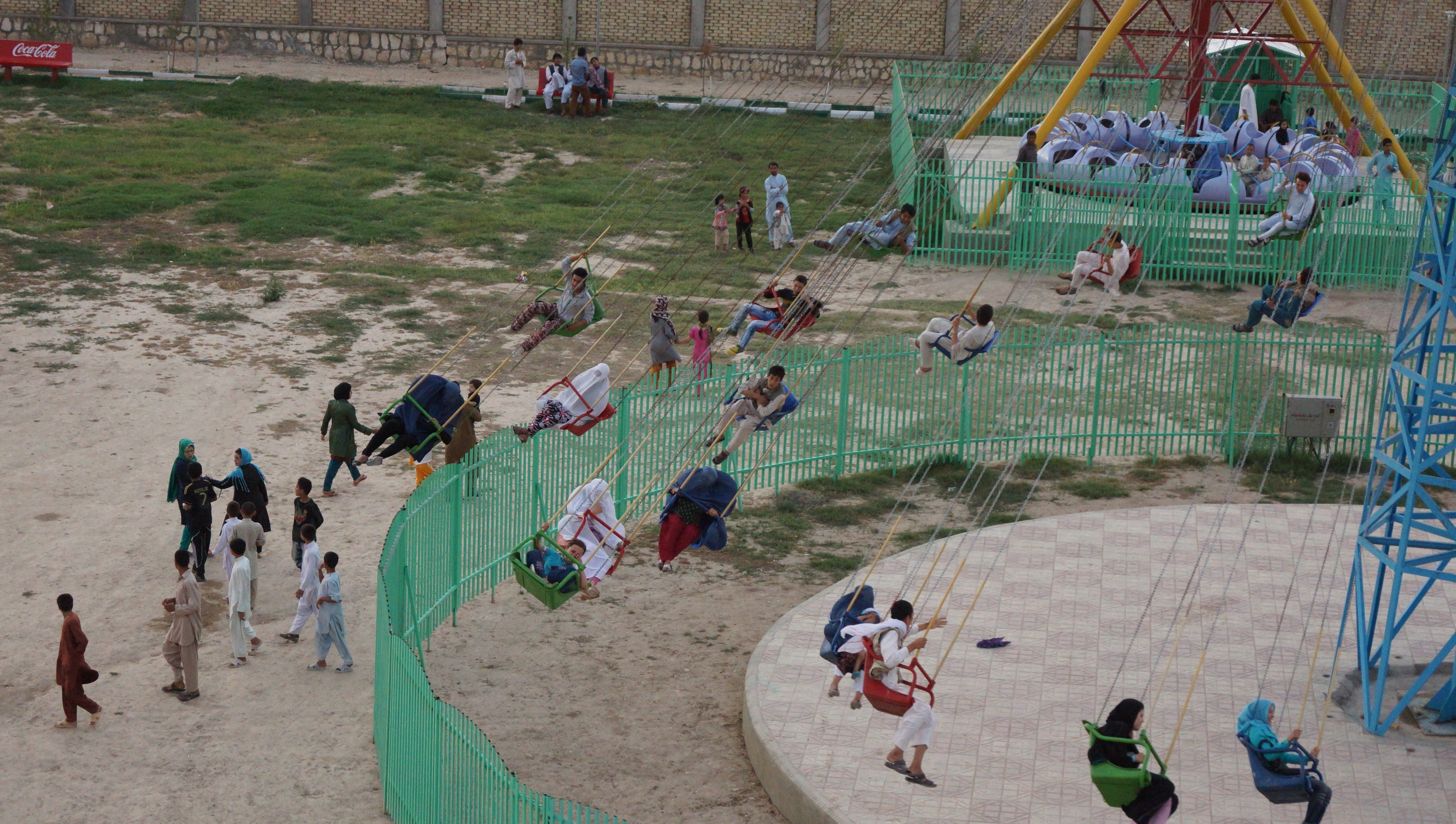
Locals of Mazar-i-Sharif enjoying rides at a small family amusement park in 2012

Mazar-i-Sharif has an estimated population of 568,013 people. In 2015 there were 77,615 dwelling units in the city.

The November 2003 issue of National Geographic magazine indicated the ethnic composition as Pashtuns 15%, Hazaras 12%, Tajiks 53%, Turkmens 10%, and Uzbeks 20%. Occasional ethnic violence has been reported in the region in the last decades, mainly between Pashtuns and the other groups. In 2011 news reports mentioned assassinations taking place in the area but with no evidence as to who is behind them.

The dominant language in Mazar-i-Sharif is an eastern dialect of Persian known as Dari, followed by Pashto, and Uzbek.

Research shows that exposure to war and armed violence in Mazar-e-Sharif has led to the development of mental disorders, including depression, anxiety, post-traumatic stress disorder (PTSD), and substance use disorders. Studies conducted in Mazar-e-Sharif, which were conducted after the fall of the Taliban and under conditions of relative security, show that despite a relative decrease in direct experience of war among the younger generation, the psychological effects of war continue to be severe in the form of daily stress and psychological problems, especially in men. These stresses and mental disorders are caused by past war events and socio-cultural problems that continue to have an impact on the mental health of individuals.

== Economy ==
Mazar-i-Sharif serves as the major trading center in northern Afghanistan. The local economy is dominated by trade, agriculture and Karakul sheep farming. Small-scale oil and gas exploration have also boosted the city's prospects. It is also the location of consulates of India, Iran, Pakistan, Russia, Tajikistan, Turkey, Turkmenistan and Uzbekistan for trading and political linking purposes.

== Main sights ==
The modern city of Mazar-i Sharif is centred around the Shrine of Ali. Much restored, it is one of Afghanistan's most glorious monuments. Outside Mazar-i Sharif lies the ancient city of Balkh. The city is a centre for the traditional buzkashi sport, and the Blue Mosque is the focus of northern Afghanistan's Nowruz celebration. Although most Muslims believe that the real grave of Ali is found within Imam Ali Mosque in Najaf, Iraq, others still come to Mazar-i-Sharif to pay respect.

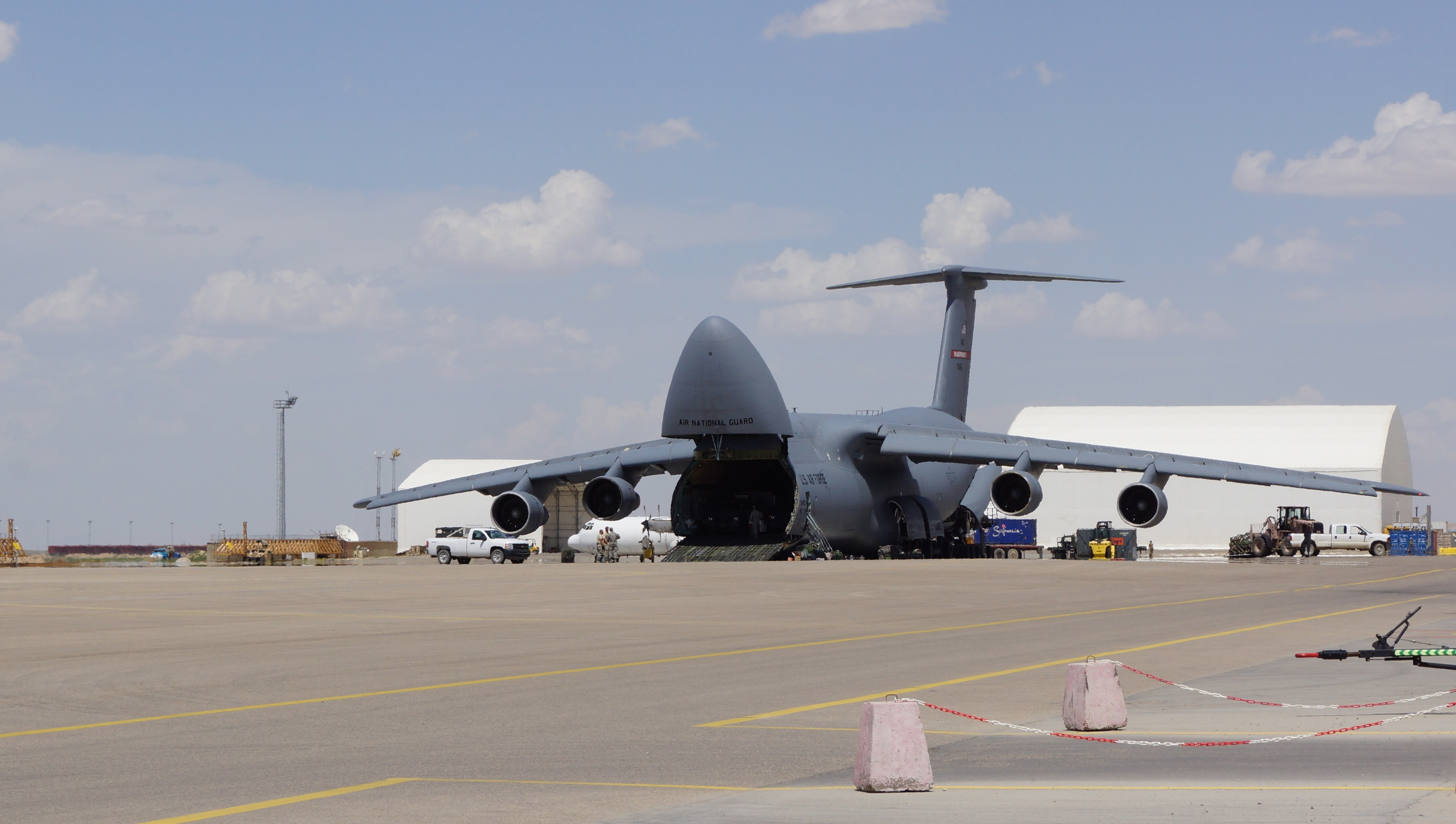
An American C-5 Galaxy at Mazar-i-Sharif Airport

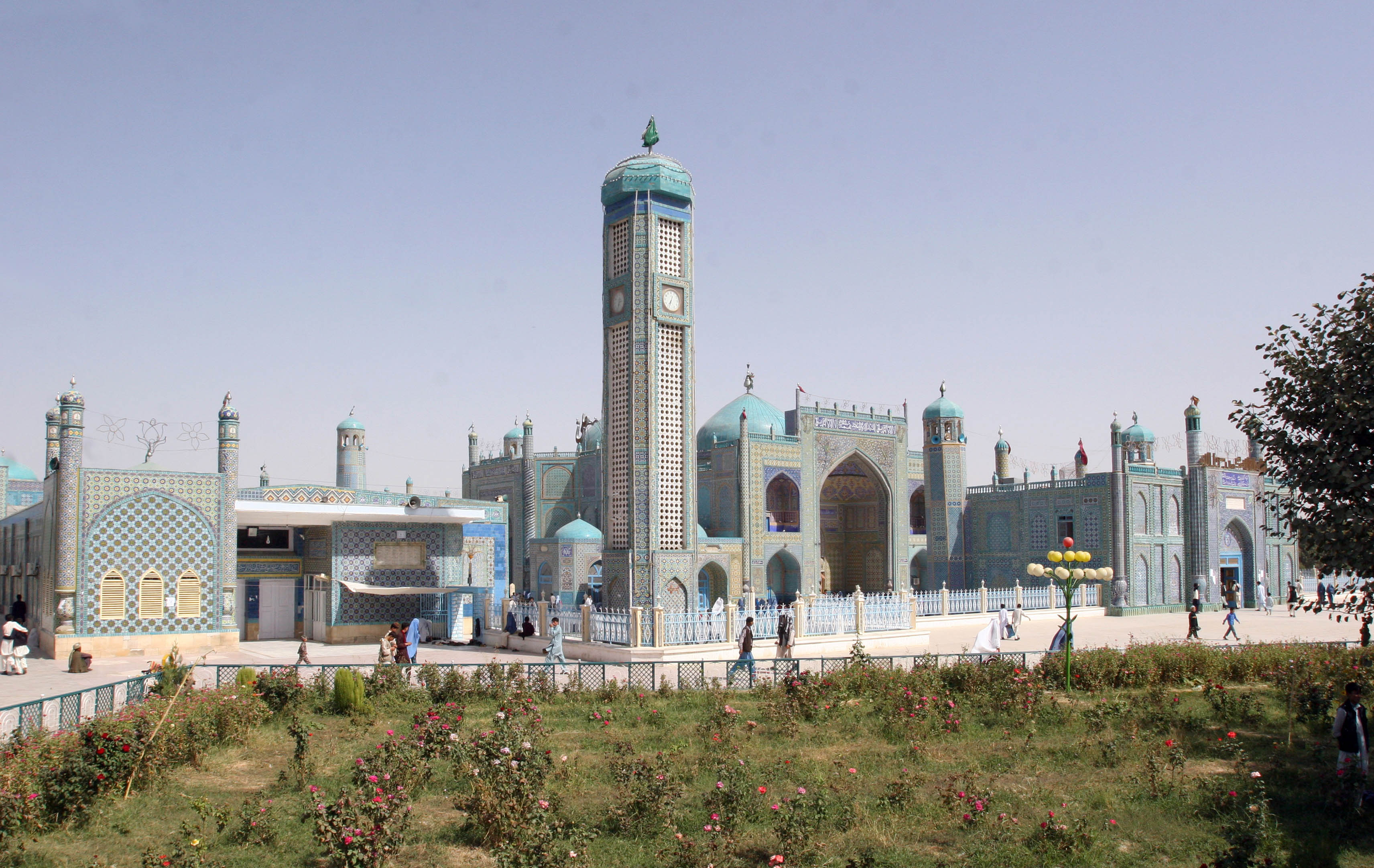
The Blue Mosque is a destination for pilgrims.

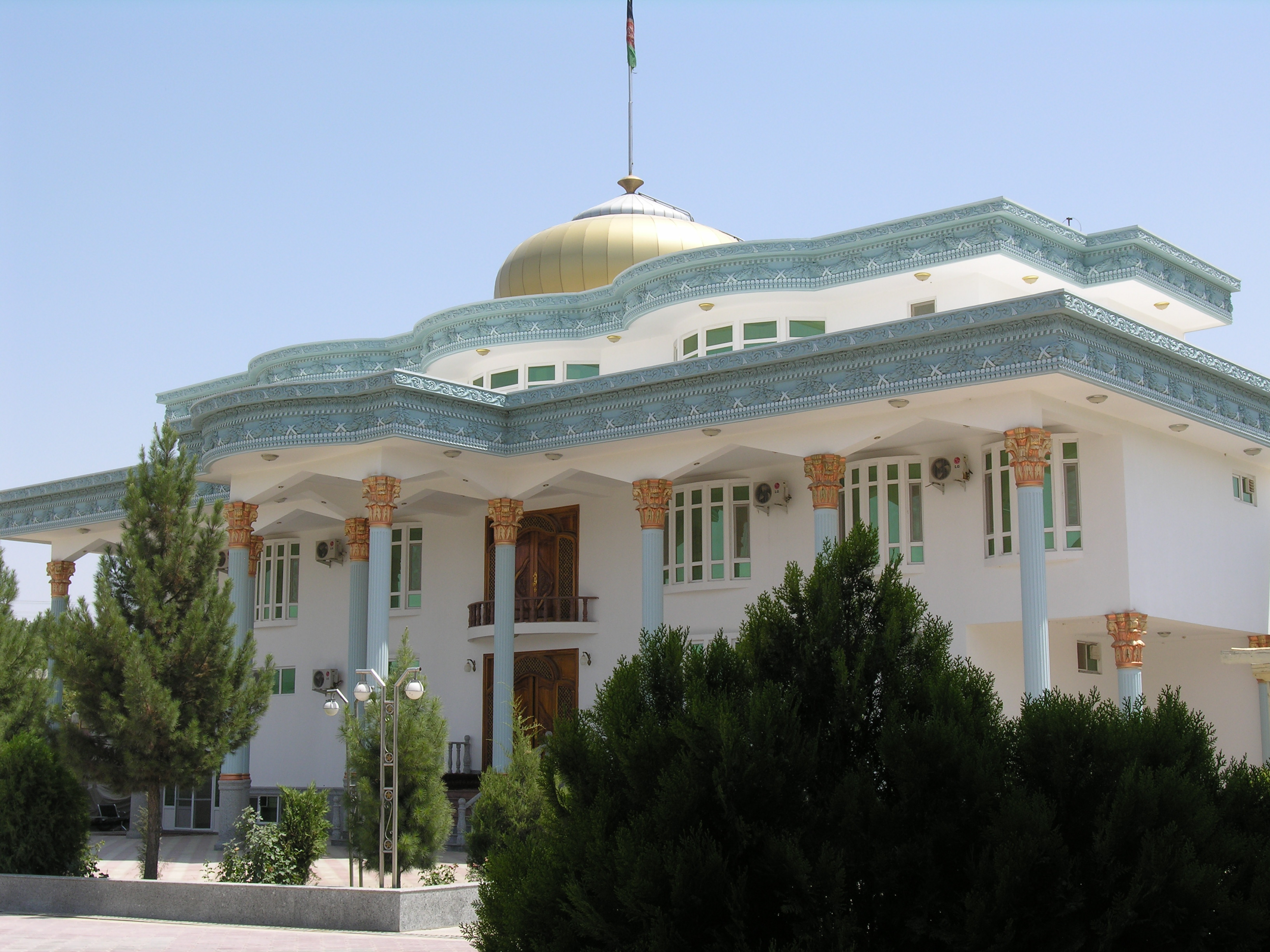
Governor's Palace

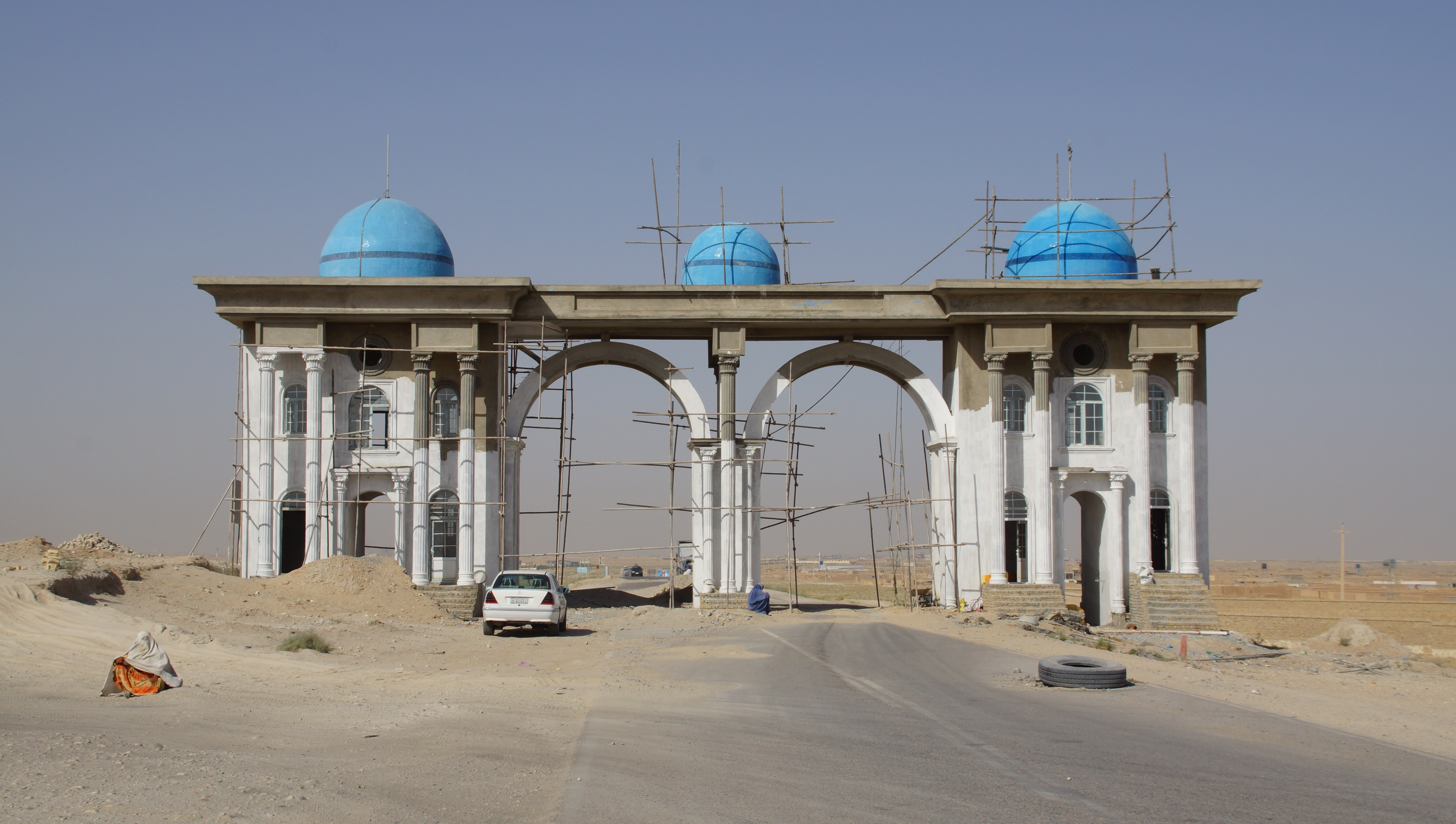
Mazar-i-Sharif Gate under construction (July 2012)

- Airports
  - Mazar-i-Sharif Airport – serves the population of Balkh Province and is also used by NATO-led forces, including the Afghan Air Force. It is being expanded to become the 4th international airport in Afghanistan.
- Mosques
  - Mausoleum of Imam Ali
- Parks and monuments
  - Park-e-Ariana
  - Maulana Jalaludin Cultural Park
  - Tashkurgan Palace
  - Governors Palace
  - Mazar-i-Sharif Gate
  - Khalid Ibn-al Walid Park
- Universities
  - Balkh University
  - Aria University
  - Sadat University
  - Mawlana University
  - Taj University
  - Turkistan University
  - Rah-e-Saadat University

== Sports ==
football, futsal and volleyball are the most popular sports in Afghanistan. Buzkashi is a traditional sport played in Mazar-i-Sharif.

Professional sports teams from Mazar-i-Sharif

Club	League	Sport	Venue	Established
				2018
				2013
Simorgh Alborz F.C.	Afghan Premier League	Football	Balkh Ground	2012

- Stadiums
  - Buzkashi Stadium

== Infrastructure ==
=== Transportation ===
==== Rail ====
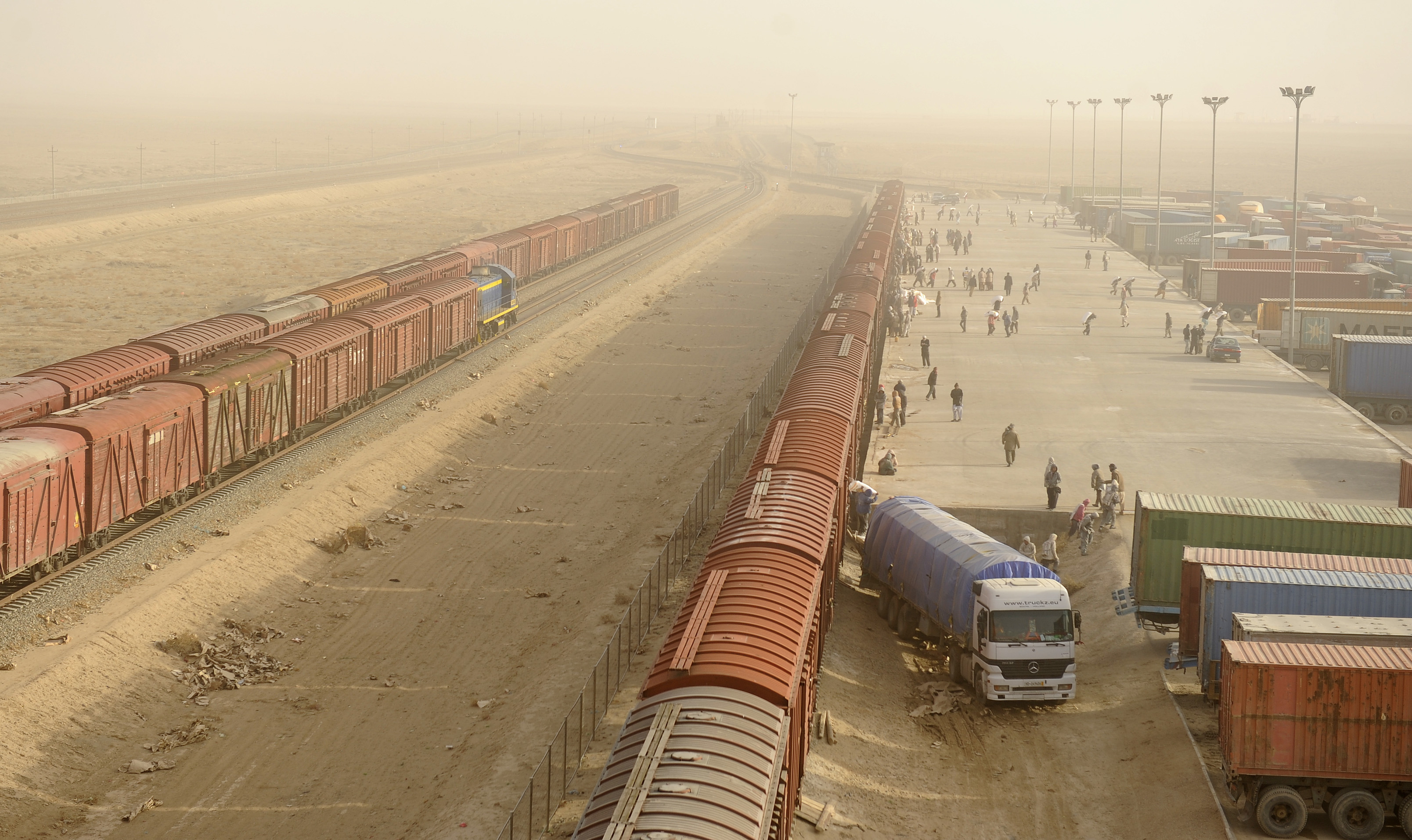
Railway terminal

It became the first city in Afghanistan to connect itself by rail with a neighboring country. Rail service from Mazar-i-Sharif to Uzbekistan began in December 2011 and cargo on freight trains arrive at a station near Mazar-i-Sharif Airport, where the goods are reloaded onto trucks or airplanes and sent to their last destinations across Afghanistan.

==== Air ====
As of June 2016 Mazar-i-Sharif Airport has direct air connections to Kabul, Mashad, Tehran, and Istanbul.

==== Road ====
Highway AH76 links Mazar-i-Sharif to Sheberghan in the west, and Pul-e Khomri and Kabul to the south-east. Roads to the east link it to Kunduz. Roads to the north link it to the Uzbek border town Termez, where it becomes highway M39 going north to Samarkand and Tashkent. Roads to the south link it to Bamiyan Province and the mountainous range of central Afghanistan.

== Notable people ==
- Emir Wazir Akbar Khan, buried in the city
- Emir Sher Ali Khan, buried in the city
- Ajab Khan Afridi, freedom fighter against the British Raj
- Morsal Obeidi (German-Afghan murder victim) – Born in Mazar-i-Sharif, moved to Germany at age three, and lived in Mazar-i-Sharif for eight months after her parents sent her there to Islamize her.
- Zalmay Khalilzad (Afghan born American diplomat)
- Wasef Bakhtari, Afghan poet of the Persian language, literary figure and intellectual, one of the first Persian poets to introduce she’r-e nimaa'i ("Nimaic poetry") to Afghan-Persian literature, grew up in Mazar-i-Sharif
- Abdul Ali Mazari, ethnic Hazara and political leader of the Hezb-e Wahdat party, born in the village of Charkent, south of the northern city of Mazar-i-Sharif
- Muhammad Mohaqiq, politician in Afghanistan as a member of the Afghanistan Parliament, founder and chairman of the People's Islamic Unity Party of Afghanistan
- Atta Muhammad Nur, former mujahideen resistance commander for the Jamiat-e Islami against the Soviets and also commander in the United Front (Northern Alliance) under Ahmad Shah Massoud against the Taliban, also former Governor of Balkh Province (2004–2018), born in Mazar-i-Sharif
- Farshad Noor, Afghan professional football player who plays as a midfielder for the Afghanistan national football team
- Frozan Safi, activist assassinated after protesting against the Taliban regime.

== Twin towns and sister cities ==
- Dushanbe, Tajikistan (since 1991)
- Mashhad, Iran

== See also ==
- Battle of Qala-i-Jangi
- Balkh Province
