= Balkh University =

University in Afghanistan

Coordinates: 35.7038°N 51.3950°E

- د بلخ پوهنتون / پوهنتون بلخ
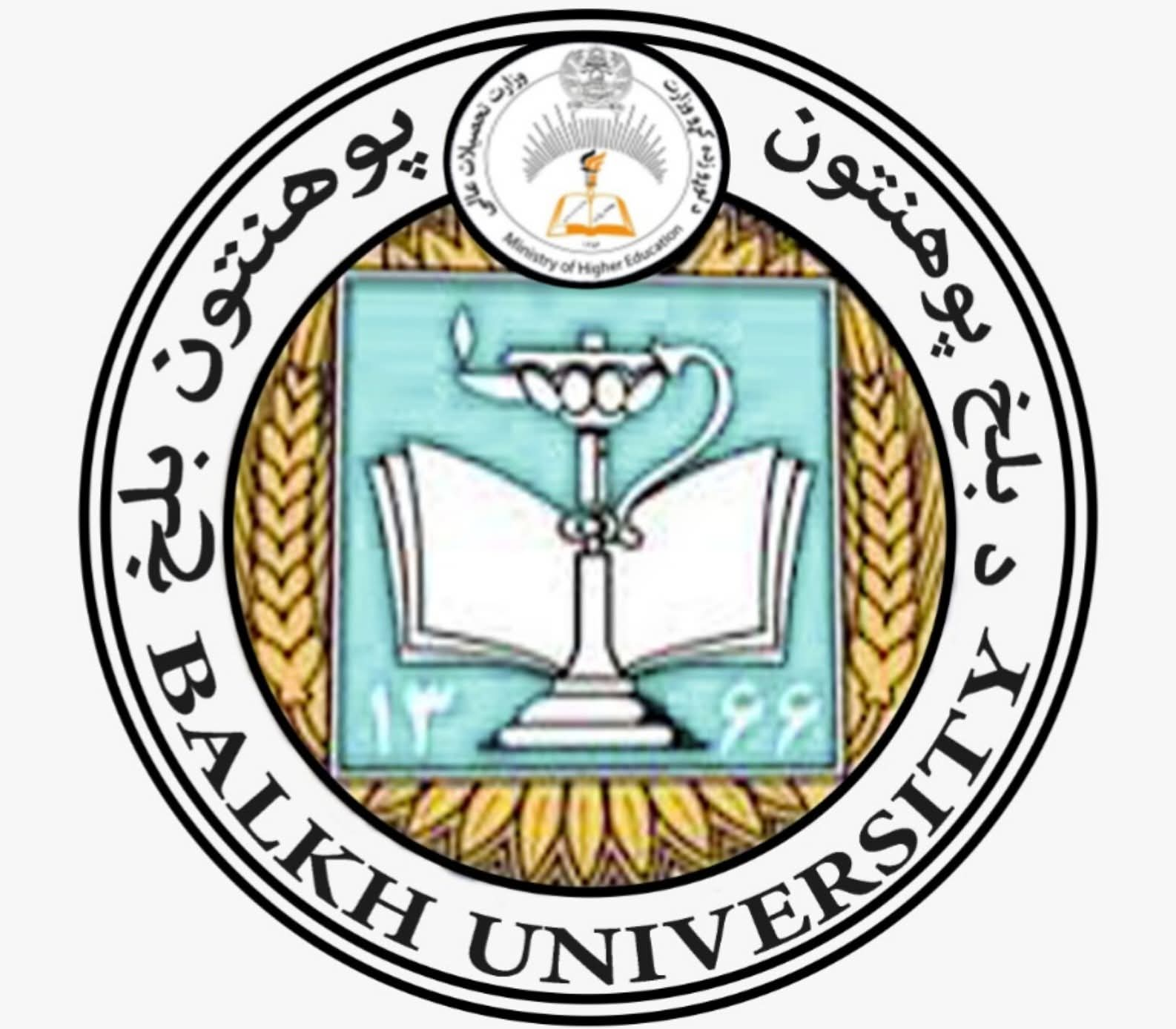
- Type: Public
- Established: 1987
- Chancellor: Mufti Mohammad Sharif Osmani
- President: Khalil Kelewal
- Faculty: 430
- Students: 18,000
- Location: Mazar-i-Sharif, Balkh, Afghanistan
- Website: ba.edu.af

Balkh University (Note: Pashto: د بلخ پوهنتون Dari: پوهنتون بلخ) is the largest public university in Mazar-i-Sharif, which is the capital of Balkh Province in northern Afghanistan. Established in 1986, the university has about 18,000 students. Its current chancellor is Mufti Mohammad Sharif Osmani. His predecessor was Mawlawi Zia ul Haq Zia Karimi.

Balkh University is controlled by the Ministry of Higher Education, which is headquartered in Kabul. It is the third-largest in Afghanistan after Kabul University and Nangarhar University. Faculties include medicine, engineering, economics, journalism, literature, law and science. Printing and publishing scientific journal entitled "Balkh Scientific Journal" and "Marafat" which in both of them publish the works and research of lecturers. Balkh University has monthly outlook (News paper, of cultural and analysis of Balkh University) and Balkh Journalistic monthly newspaper (Department of Journalism outlook.

The students have access to the university's library. Furthermore, the university has dedicated facilities for sports, physical education and sporting events.

As part of its contributions to the rebuilding of Afghanistan, the government of Pakistan expanded the university by adding the Liaquat Ali Khan Faculty of Engineering, a 10 million dollar separate block, completed in 2012.

Following the Taliban takeover in 2021, one of the university's professors, Frozan Safi, was killed after taking part in demonstrations against the regime.

== See also ==
- List of universities in Afghanistan
