= Mausoleum of Imam Ali =

Mosque and shrine in Afghanistan

Mausoleum of Ali
- د امام علي مقبره مقام علی
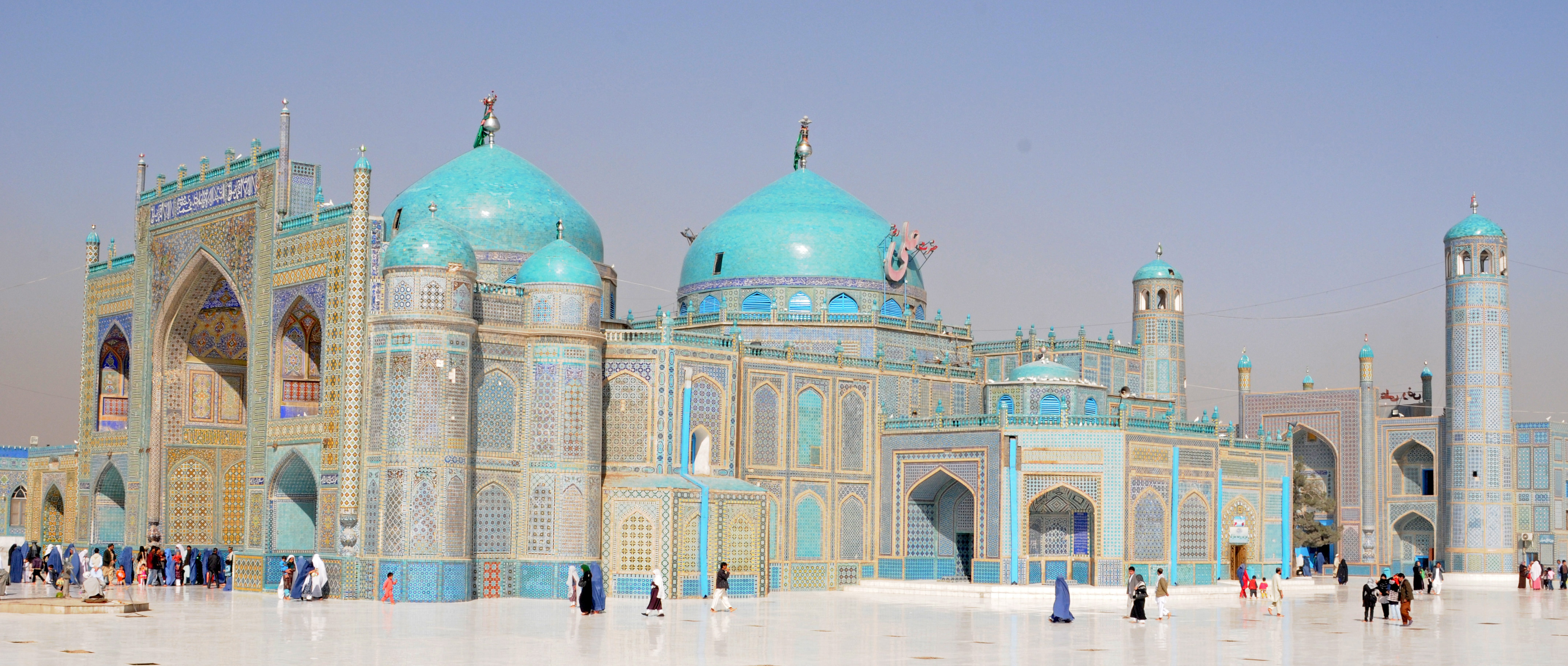
- The shrine as photographed in 2012

- Location of the mausoleum and mosque in Afghanistan

Religion
- Affiliation: Islam
- Province: Balkh Province
- Deity: Allah
- Festival: Nowruz Eid-al-Fitr Eid-al-Adha
- Ecclesiastical or organisational status: Mausoleum and mosque
- Ownership: Government of Afghanistan
- Governing body: Ministry of Information and Culture
- Status: Damaged since 2025

Location
- Location: Mazar-i-Sharif
- Country: Afghanistan
- Interactive map of Mausoleum of Ali
- Coordinates: 36°42′30″N 67°06′40″E

Architecture
- Type: Islamic architecture
- Style: Timurid
- Completed: c. 10th–16th century CE

Specifications
- Dome: Two (maybe more)
- Minaret: c. 10 (maybe more)
- Shrine: One: Ali (r. 656–661)

The Mausoleum of Imam Ali, (Note: Pashto: د امام علي مقبرهDari: مقام علی) also known as the Blue Mosque, (Note: Pashto: نیلي جوماتDari: مسجد کبود) is a mausoleum and mosque complex located in Mazar-i-Sharif, the capital and largest city of Balkh Province in northern Afghanistan. It is a popular tourist attraction in the middle of the city, which is visited all year long by all people regardless of religion or sect.

The complex purportedly houses the tomb of Caliph Ali, also known as the first Imam of Shia Muslims (r. 656–661). Many pilgrims annually celebrate Nowruz (New Year) at the site. At the annual Janda Bala ceremony, a flag used to be raised in honor of Ali and pilgrims would touch the flag for supposed good luck in the New Year. This particular ceremony has been officially halted in recent years.

== History ==
The earliest surviving source stating Ali to be buried in Balkh is Tuhfat al-Albab of the Andalusian traveller Abu Hamid al-Gharnati (d. 1170). Abd al-Ghafur Lari wrote that Muhammad al-Baqir, the fifth Shia imam, assigned Abu Muslim the task of transferring Ali's body to Khurasan, though this is likely apocryphal. The land around the site was formerly a memorial mosque dedicated to Ali al-Balkhi, a Hanafi Muslim scholar and statesman who died in the same place.

The first structure of the site dates back to the Seljuk era. It was a shrine built by Sultan Ahmad Sanjar in 1136. In the 13th century, the Mongols under Genghis Khan invaded Balkh, where they massacred the Balkhi population and destroyed their places of worship. The shrine built by Sanjar was destroyed by the Mongols in the year 1220. The Mongols were led to believe that there was a significant amount of treasure under it.

In the 15th century, the Timurid amir, Sultan Husayn Bayqara, ordered a reconstruction of the destroyed building.

In later years, various rulers made repairs and endowments, including the Shaybanid emir Abd al-Mu'min ibn Abd Allah Khan, who built a dome. Later, Berdi Beg, the Khan of the Golden Horde who reigned from 1357 to 1359, added several decorations to the building. In the modern era, a plan was created to renovate the whole complex in 1910.

Sher Ali Khan, Emir of Afghanistan in 1860s, and some of his relatives are also buried at the site. During the 2025 Balkh earthquake, the structure's minaret was partially damaged and cracks formed in the walls. Afghanistan's Ministry of Information and Culture immediately pledged to "assess and repair the damage".

== Gallery ==
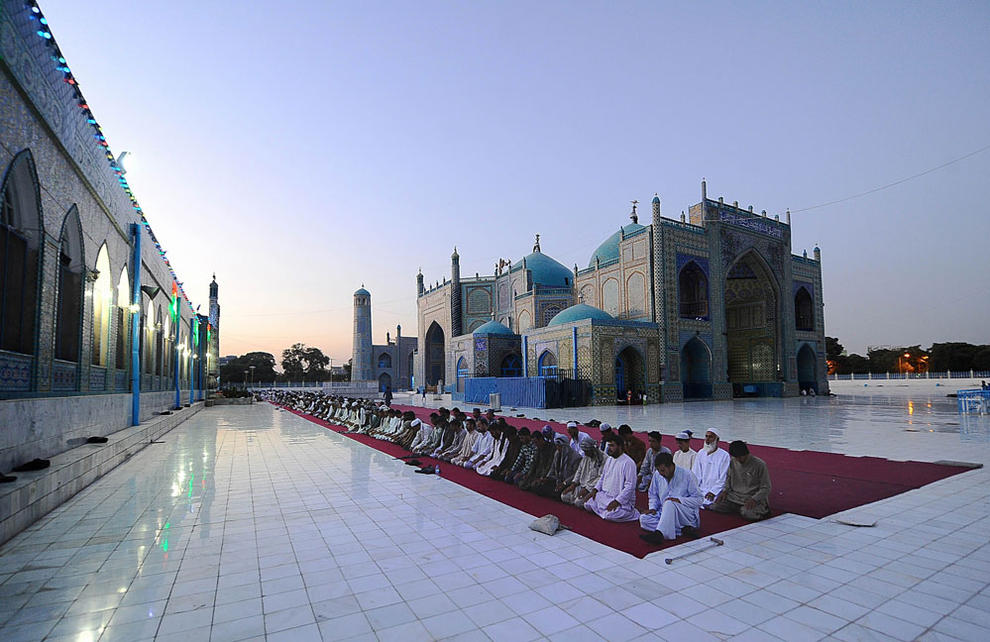
Men praying during Ramadan, 2012

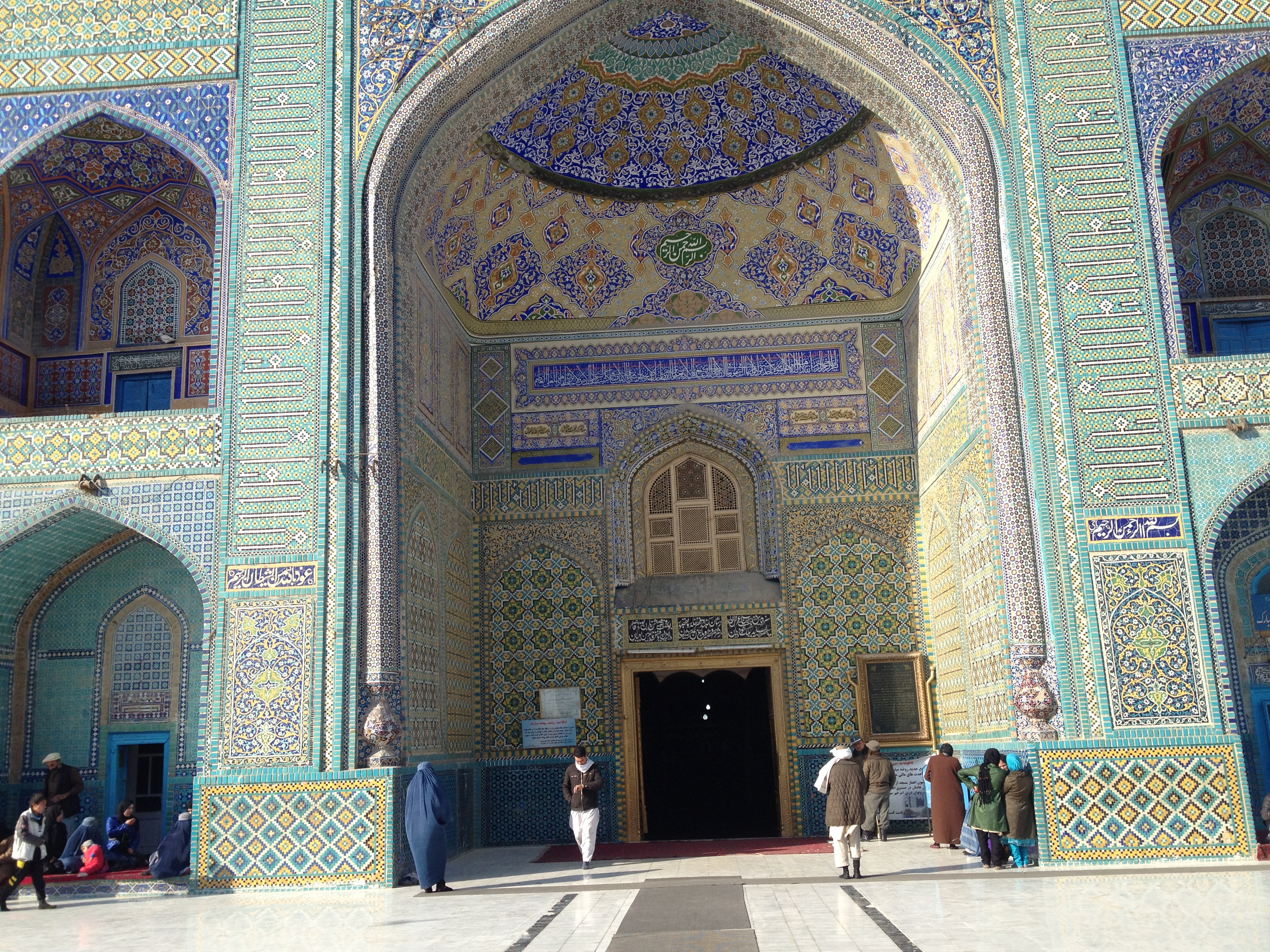
Entrance to one of the buildings

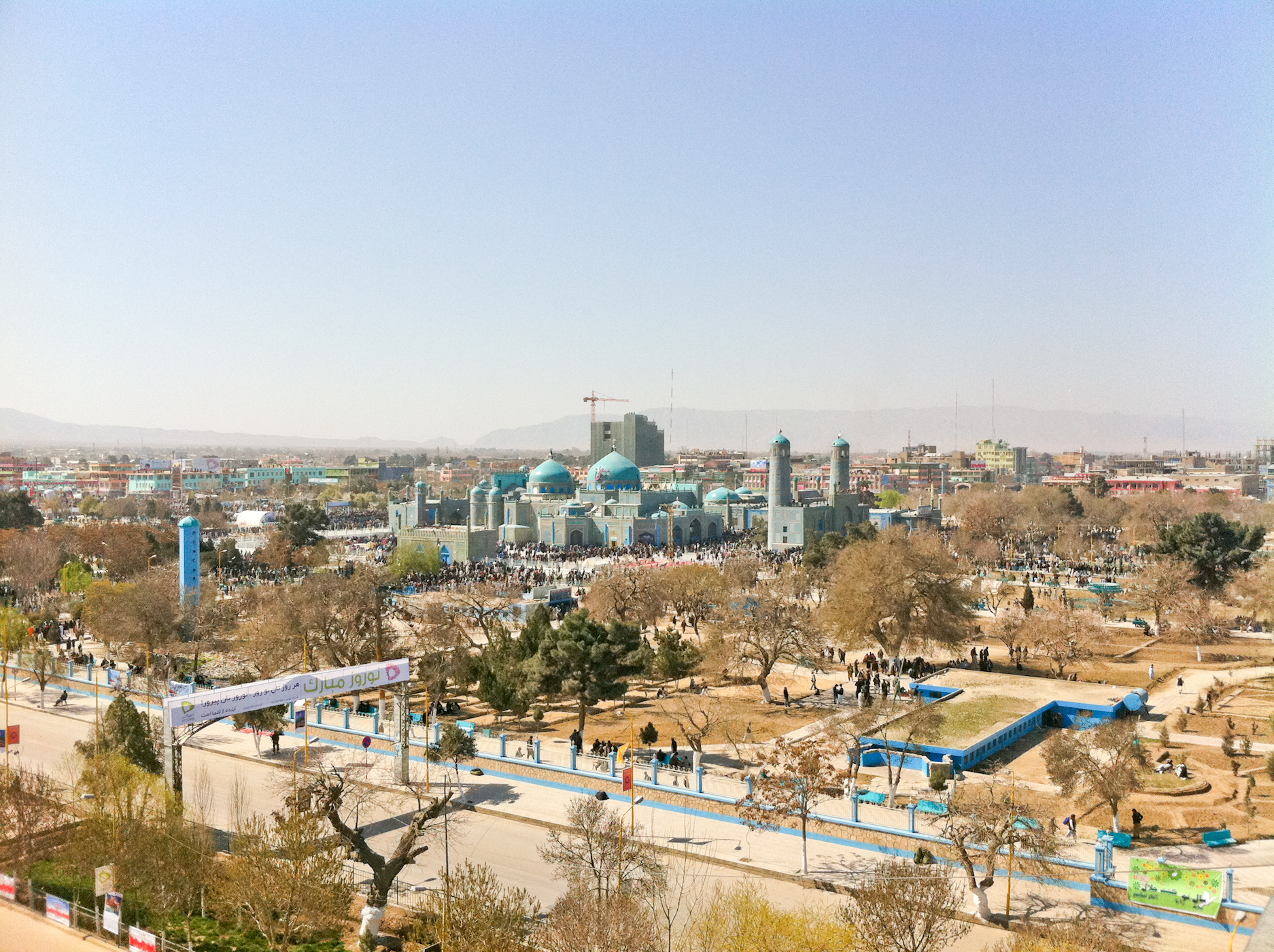
Distant view of the mosque in 2011

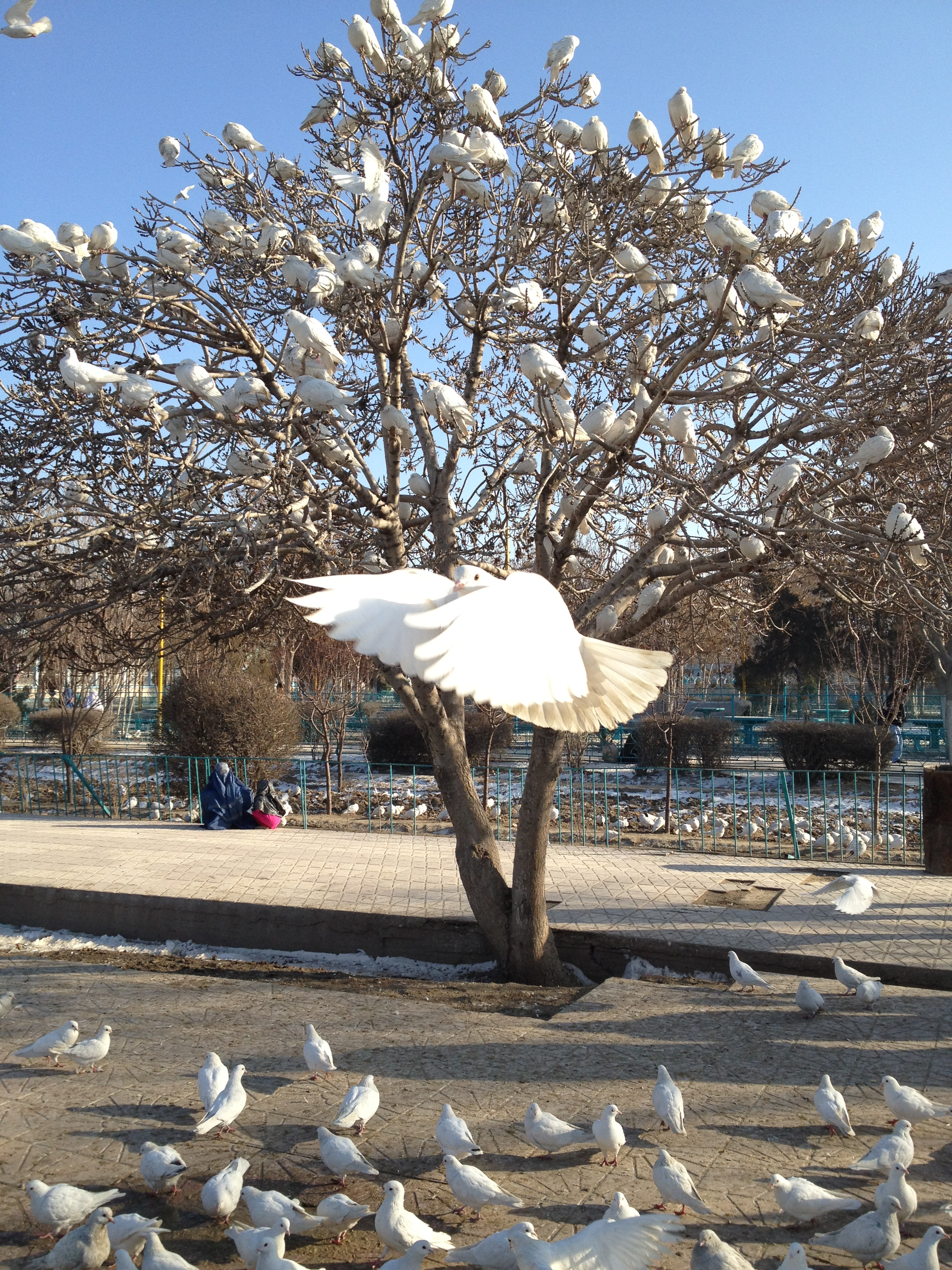
White pigeons in the Blue Mosque's courtyard

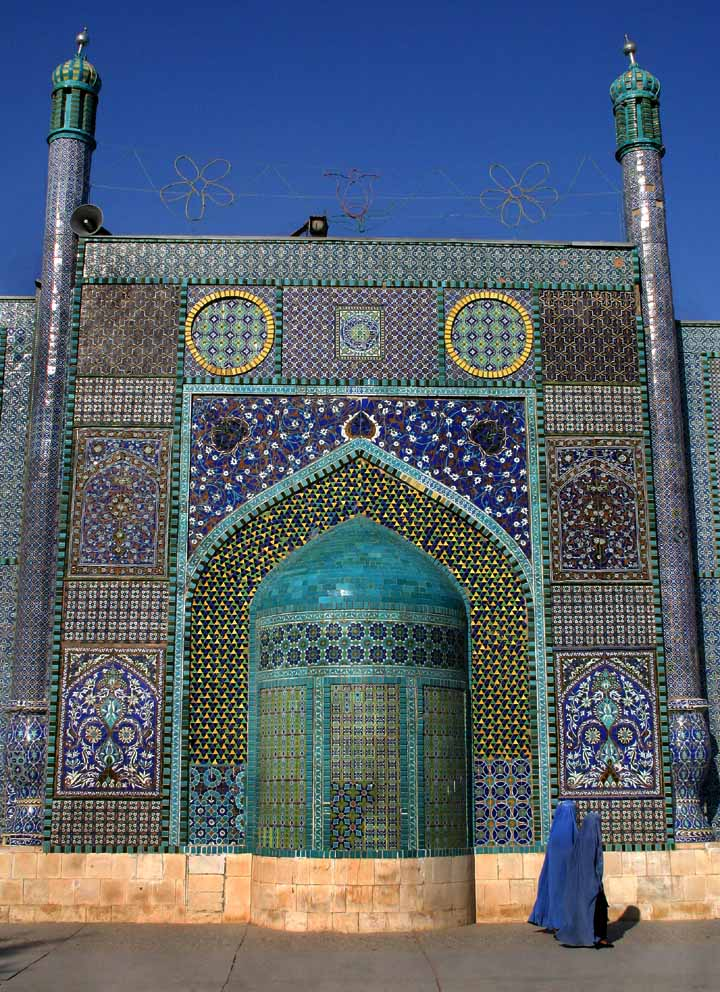
Close up

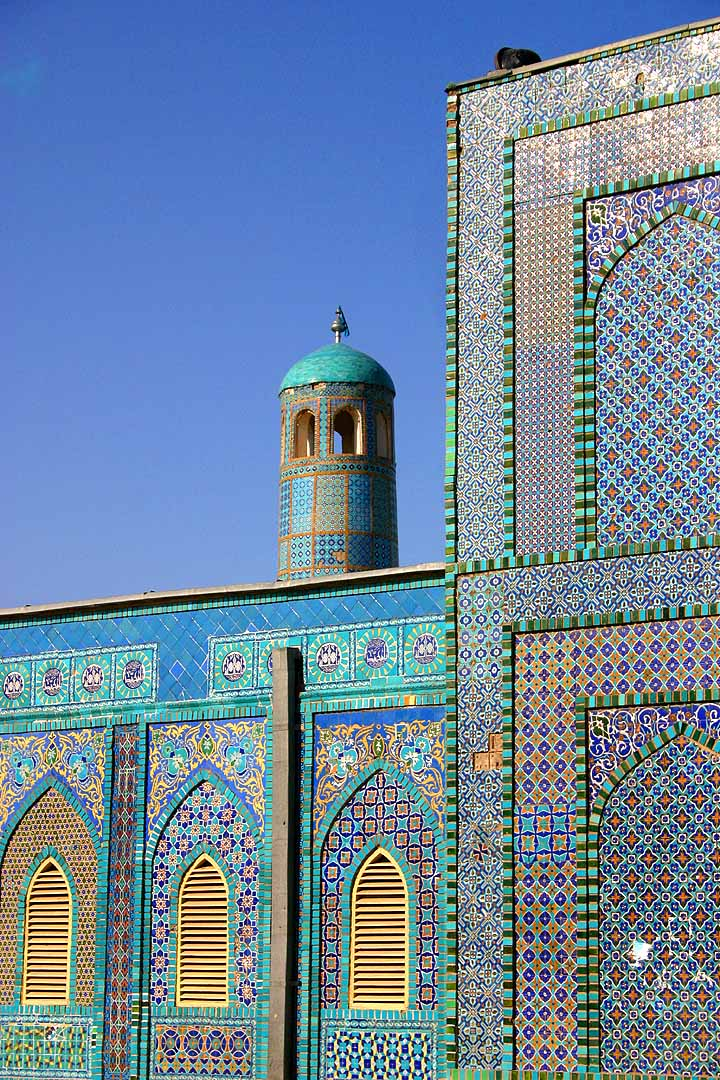
Central Asian style tile work

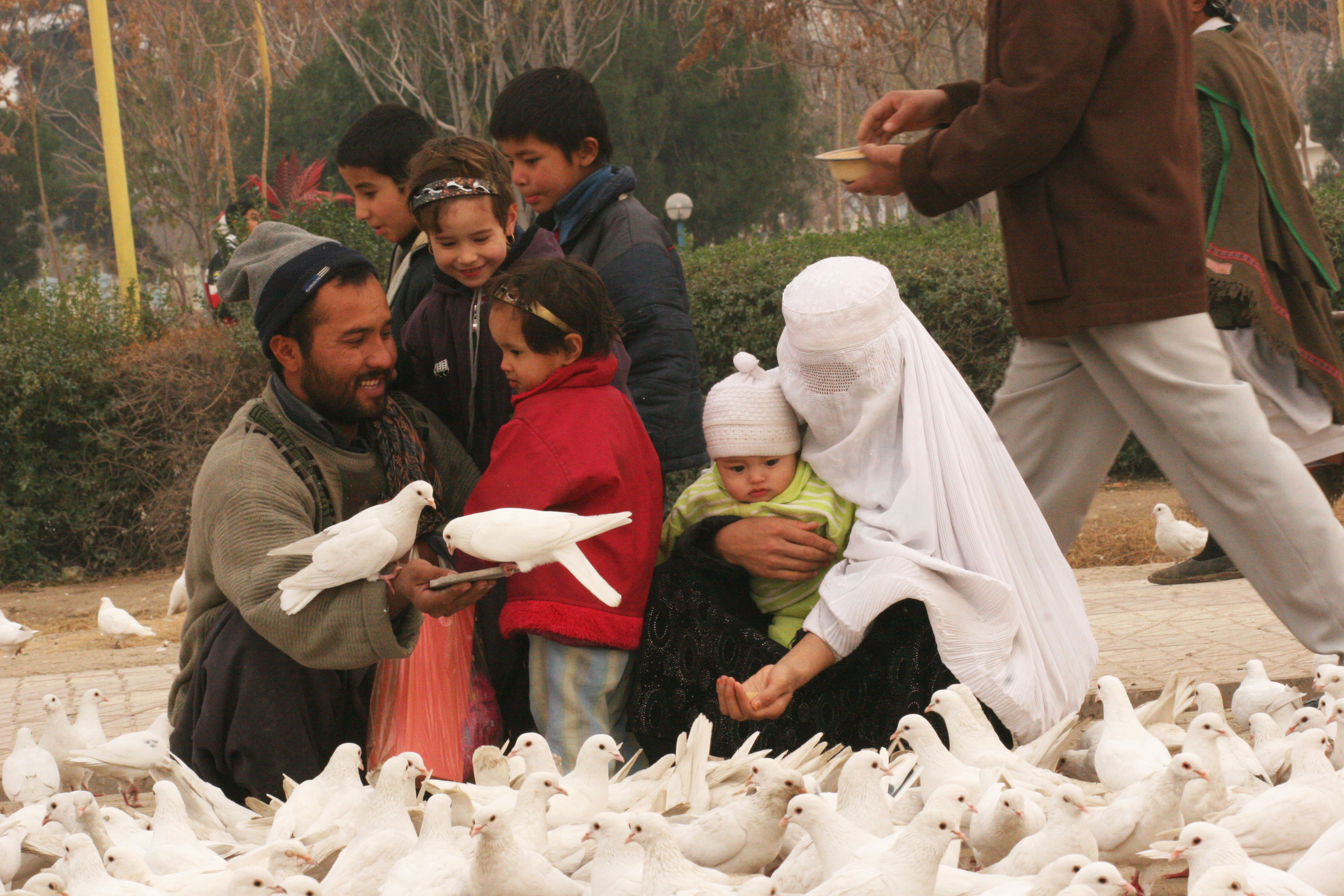
A family feeding the pigeons

== See also ==
- List of mosques in Afghanistan
- Tourism in Afghanistan
