= Safi al-Din =

Safi al-Din (Arabic: صفي الدين) is an Arabic masculine given name and surname. It may also be spelled as Safi-ad-din, Safiuddin, Safieddine etc. The name is composed of two Arabic elements: Safi (صافي) meaning pure and Al-Din (الدین) religion. It may refer to:

- Safi al-Din Abu Shnaaf (1931–2018), Egyptian military general
- Safi al-Din al-Hilli (1278–1349), Arab poet
- Safi al-Din al-Hindi (c. 1246–1315), Indian Islamic scholar
- Safi al-Din al-Urmawi (c. 1216 – 1294), Persian musician and writer
- Safi-ad-din Ardabili (1252–1334), Kurdish poet, Islamic mystic and eponym of the Safavid dynasty
- Safiuddin Ahmed (1922–2012), Bangladeshi painter
- Abdallah Safi-Al-Din (born 1960), Lebanese Hezbollah official and diplomat
- Francois Safieddine, American poker player
- Hashem Safieddine (1964–2024), Lebanese Shia cleric and Hezbollah leader

== See also ==
- Safiuddin Sarker Academy and College, Bangladesh
