= Frozan Safi =

Afghan human rights activist (1992–2021)

- فروزان صافی
- Born: 1992
- Died: 20 October 2021 (aged 28–29); Balkh Province, Afghanistan
- Cause of death: Shot
- Occupations: Teacher; Human rights activist

Frozan Safi (Dari: فروزان صافی; c. 1992–2021) was an Afghan human rights activist and teacher. A lecturer at Balkh University, she took part in protests against the Taliban after they took over Afghanistan in August 2021. In November 2021, Safi's body was found in Mazar-i-Sharif, with her being described as the first women's rights activist to be killed in Afghanistan following the Taliban's return to power.

== Activism ==
At the time of the Taliban offensive, Safi lived in Mazar-i-Sharif and worked as an economics lecturer at Balkh University. After the Taliban returned to power, women's rights were curtailed across Afghanistan, including girls being banned from education and women being prohibited from participating in most jobs and sports, including Safi's own job as a lecturer.

From August 2021, Safi took part in several protests in Mazar-i-Sharif against the Taliban regime and the restrictions it placed on women, in addition to the new Taliban government being made up exclusively of men. Safi last took part in a protest in October, shortly before her disappearance.

The targeted killings of women's rights activists in Afghanistan had increased in 2021 even prior to the Taliban takeover in August; none were reported in the first few months following the Taliban's take over in August 2021.

== Disappearance and death ==
Safi was last seen by her family on 20 October 2021. Prior to her disappearance, she had reported having received an anonymous phone call asking her to gather evidence of her work as a human rights activist and to travel to a safe house. Safi believed that the call was in relation to a request she had made for asylum in Germany. She subsequently packed a bag and left her home, getting into a car which her family believed was transporting her to Mawlana Jalaluddin Mohammad Balkhi International Airport for an evacuation flight. Safi remained in contact with her family over the phone until 16:00, when contact suddenly ceased.

On 4 November, Taliban security forces brought the bodies of two unidentified women to Balkh Provincial Hospital in Mazar-i-Sharif. One of the bodies was subsequently identified as being Safi; her sister stated that she had to be identified by her clothing due to her face being "destroyed" by bullets, with Safi having bullet wounds to her head, heart, chest, kidneys and legs. It was also reported that her engagement ring and bag were missing from her body.

Zabihullah Noorani, the director of information and cultural affairs for Balkh Province, stated that the bodies of the two women had been found alongside those of two men at a home in Mazar-i-Sharif, suggesting that they had been the victims of a "personal feud". Safi's father stated that Safi's body had been found in a tar pit in the town of Khalid ibn al-Walid outside of Mazar-i-Sharif. It was subsequently established that the bodies of six women had been found in and around Mazar-i-Sharif at the same time; human rights groups reported that Safi's body had been found outside a ditch on the road towards the airport alongside three other activists who had believed they were being taken to evacuation flight after participating in anti-Taliban demonstrations. The two bodies found in the house in Mazar-i-Sharif were subsequently reported to have included the body of a former female soldier and separate to the death of Safi.

No group claimed responsibility for the deaths of Safi and the other activists, who were described as the first women's rights activists to be killed under the new Taliban regime. The United Nations in Afghanistan stated it was "deeply concerned" by Safi's death and called for an independent and impartial investigation into her death, as well as into the death of Hijratullah Khogyani in Jalalabad.
