= Samar Safi-Harb =

Canadian astrophysicist

- Title: Professor

Academic background
- Education: University of Wisconsin-Madison

Academic work
- Discipline: Astrophysics
- Sub-discipline: Supernova remnants
- Institutions: University of Manitoba
- Website: http://www2.physics.umanitoba.ca/u/samar/

Samar Safi-Harb is a professor in the Department of Physics and Astronomy at the University of Manitoba and a Canada Research Chair in Supernova Remnant Astrophysics and Extreme Astrophysics. She was the Vice President of the Canadian Astronomical Society from 2020 to 2021.

== Background and education ==
Samar Safi-Harb grew up in Lebanon during the Lebanese civil war. Despite loving physics in high school, Safi-Harb thought she would become a medical doctor and started a pre-medical physics undergraduate degree at the American University of Beirut. After her undergraduate degree, she chose to follow her passion in physics and pursued graduate studies in physics at the University of Wisconsin-Madison, receiving her MSc in 1993 and her PhD in 1997.

Following her graduate studies, Safi-Harb completed a fellowship at NASA's Goddard Space Flight Center where she worked in the high energy astrophysics lab. In 2000, she left NASA to start the University of Manitoba's graduate astrophysics program.

== Research ==
Safi-Harb's research focuses on high energy studies of the remnants leftover by supernovae, including neutron stars and their nebulae. In 2021, Safi-Harb and her former graduate student Harsha Blumer published their results from their observations of the magnetar Swift J1818.0−1607, first detected by the NASA's Neil Gehrels Swift Observatory in 2020, using the Chandra X-Ray Observatory.
