= Aleksandr Kakhidze =

Russian-Georgian footballer

Personal information
- Date of birth: 24 April 1999 (age 27)
- Place of birth: Balashikha, Russia
- Height: 1.78 m (5 ft 10 in)
- Position: Defender

Team information
- Current team: FC Neftekhimik Nizhnekamsk
- Number: 24

Youth career
- PFC CSKA Moscow
- FC Spartak Moscow

Senior career*
Years	Team	Apps	(Gls)
2017	FC Inter-Alfa Moscow		
2018–2019	FSC Dolgoprudny-2		
2018–2019	→ CF Montañesa (loan)		
2019–2020	FC Metallurg Lipetsk	17	(1)
2020–2022	FC Veles Moscow	81	(2)
2023	FC Yenisey Krasnoyarsk	8	(0)
2023–	FC Neftekhimik Nizhnekamsk	63	(3)
- * Club domestic league appearances and goals as of 16 May 2026

Aleksandr Giviyevich Kakhidze (Georgian: ალექსანდრე კახიძე; Russian: Александр Гивиевич Кахидзе; born 24 April 1999) is a Russian-Georgian football player who plays for FC Neftekhimik Nizhnekamsk.

== Club career ==
He made his debut in the Russian Football National League for FC Veles Moscow on 1 August 2020 in a game against FC Tekstilshchik Ivanovo, as a starter.

== International career ==
He was born and raised in Russia, but was called up to Georgia national under-19 football team for the 2017 UEFA European Under-19 Championship. He remained on the bench at the tournament.
