= Safi (given name) =

Safi (Arabic: صافي) is a name of Arabic origin meaning "pure." It is a common surname in Levantine countries such as Palestine, Syria and Lebanon. It is also employed by Afghans as a "last name" to refer to their tribal lineage within the Safi tribe, a sub-tribe based in north-eastern Afghanistan.

The surname has the highest density in the State of Palestine, and is most prevalent in Democratic Republic of the Congo.

Notable people with the name include:

- Safi of Persia (1611–1642), Safavid shah of Iran
- Safi Ahmed (born 1977), Indian cricketer
- Safi Al-Zaqrati (born 1999), Saudi Arabian footballer
- Safi Asfia (1916–2008), Iranian technocrat and politician
- Safi Bahcall (born 1968), American physicist, businessman and writer
- Safi Darashah (1902–1988), Indian cricketer
- Safi Faye (1943–2022), Senegalese film director and ethnologist
- Safi Khan Lezgi (fl. 17th century), Safavid Iranian politician
- Safi Lakhnavi (1862–1950), Indian poet
- Safi N'Diaye (born 1988), French rugby union player
- Safi Nyembo (born 1984), Congolese footballer
- Safi Qureshey (born 1951), Pakistani-American businessman
- Safi al-Rahman al-Mubarakpuri (1942–2006), Indian Islamic scholar
- Safi Rauf (born 1994), Afghan-American activist
- Safi Saïd (born 1953), Tunisian journalist, writer and politician
- Safi Taha (1923–2009), Lebanese wrestler
- Safi, a fictional character from the animated film Wish

== See also ==
Safi al-Din
