= Samah Safi Bayazid =

Jordanian American filmmaker

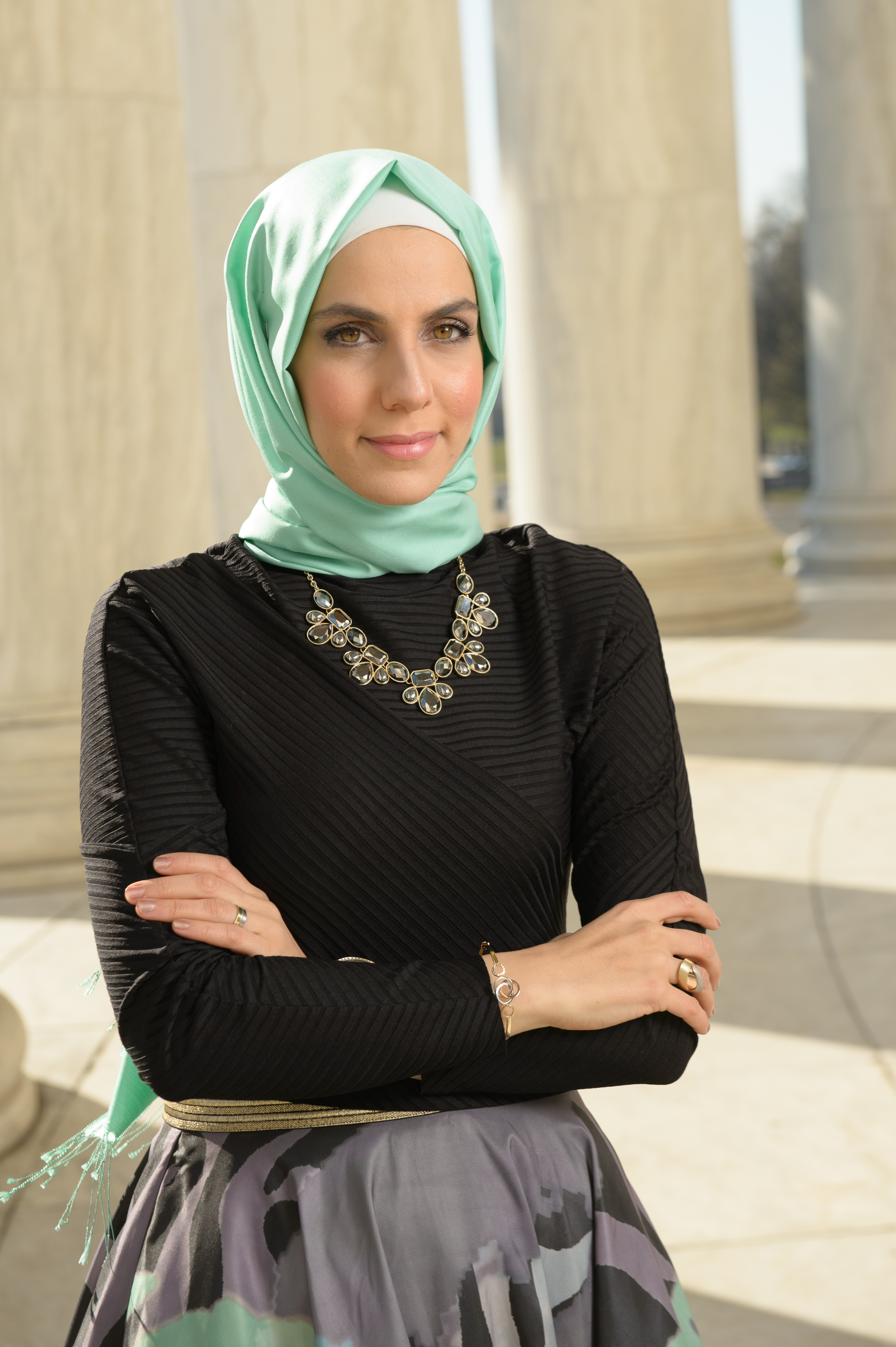
Samah Safi

Samah Safi Bayazid is a Jordanian filmmaker who lives in Washington DC, US. She studied filmmaking and screenwriting at New York Film Academy.

== Work ==
With her husband, director Muhammad Bayazid, she produced the first American drama series “Inspiration” that shows the morals of Muhammad through a dramatic plot. It went viral and got millions views on social media and TV platforms, it's been translated into 18 different languages and it won the best Creative project in ICDA Dubai Festival- 2016.

With her husband, Samah has directed many short films that have been critically acclaimed such as “Orshena”, “Fireplace” and “Telephone”.

Her film “Orshena”, a short film that addresses the refugees issue around the world and the hardship of losing their beloved ones has been officially selected for many international film festivals and won lately the Award of Excellence in Indie Film Festival in California- USA- 2016.

Her film “Fireplace”, a short film that addresses the issue of the children of war in Syria and around the world has been critically acclaimed as well and won lately an award for DAE Studio Film Festival in The United Kingdom and The Drama Award at Deep Cut Film Festival in Canada, both awards in 2017.

She is also known for other projects such as “Islamophobin” PSA that addresses the Islamphobia problem in the states, “Just like You” PSA that aims to empower Muslim women in the west, “Muhammad” Music video for the Sweden artist Maher Zain and many others.

Samah is also an advocate speaker who speaks for Muslims in the western media, women and youth empowerment and human justice. She was a guest speaker on different stages around the world like USA, UK, Turkey, Indonesia and Malaysia.

Samah gave a TEDx Talk in VA- USA in 2017, her talk was about building bridges between the east and the west and promoting love and mutual understanding between Muslims and people from other religions in the United States.

Since 2016, Samah Safi Bayazid and her husband Muhammad Bayazid sign their films which they direct together by “The Bayazids”.

== Bibliography ==
- Light Art VR | Virtual Reality 1400 years in the making
