= Andrey Pilipovets =

Belarusian footballer

Personal information
- Date of birth: 17 February 1999 (age 27)
- Place of birth: Molodechno, Minsk Oblast, Belarus
- Position: Defender

Youth career
- 2015–2017: Shakhtyor Soligorsk

Senior career*
Years	Team	Apps	(Gls)
2018	Baranovichi	9	(1)
2018–2019	Torpedo Minsk	5	(0)
2019–2020	Rukh Brest	0	(0)

International career^{‡}
2015	Belarus U17	2	(0)
2017	Belarus U19	3	(0)
2019	Belarus U21	1	(0)
- * Club domestic league appearances and goals as of 31 December 2020 ‡ National team caps and goals as of 8 June 2019

Andrey Pilipovets (Belarusian: Андрэй Піліпавец; Russian: Андрей Пилиповец; born 17 February 1999) is a Belarusian former professional footballer.
