= Ilyaz Safi =

Belarusian professional footballer

Personal information
- Date of birth: 21 January 1999 (age 27)
- Place of birth: Slutsk, Minsk Oblast, Belarus
- Position: Defender

Team information
- Current team: Orsha
- Number: 41

Youth career
- 2015–2017: Minsk

Senior career*
Years	Team	Apps	(Gls)
2017	Minsk	0	(0)
2018	Chist	13	(0)
2019	Arsenal Dzerzhinsk	22	(0)
2020	Smolevichi	2	(0)
2021–	Naftan Novopolotsk	18	(0)
2022–	→ Orsha (loan)	24	(1)
- * Club domestic league appearances and goals as of 31 December 2023

Ilyaz Safi (Belarusian: Ільяз Сафі; Russian: Ильяз Сафи; born 21 January 1999) is a Belarusian professional footballer who plays for Orsha on loan from Naftan Novopolotsk.
