= Dara-i Sufi Bala District =

- District
- Interactive map of Dara-i Sufi Bala District
- Country: Afghanistan
- Province: Samangan
- Created: 2005

Area
  - Total: 2,911 km^{2} (1,124 sq mi)

Population (2021)
  - Total: 74,349
  - Density: 25.54/km^{2} (66.15/sq mi)
- Time zone: UTC+4:30 (Afghanistan Standard Time)

Dara-i Sufi Bala District is a district in Samangan Province, Afghanistan. It was created in 2005 from Darah Sof District.

== Location ==
The district is surrounded by eight other districts. Dara-i Sufi Bala is bordered by Dara-i Sufi Payin District to the north, Aybak District and Khuram Wa Sarbagh District to the northeast, Ruyi Du Ab District to the east, Kahmard District to the southeast, Yakawlang District to the south, Balkhab District to the west, and Kishindih District to the northwest. Kahmard District and Yawkawlang District are in Bamyan Province, Balkhab District is in Sar-e Pol Province, and Kishindih District is in Balkh Province. All other districts Dara-i Sufi Bala borders are also located in Samangan Province.
