= Dara-i Sufi Payin District =

- District
- Interactive map of Dara-i Sufi Payin District
- Country: Afghanistan
- Province: Samangan
- Created: 2005
- Center: Dara-i Sufi Payin

Area
  - Total: 1,707.98 km^{2} (659.45 sq mi)

Population (2021)
  - Total: 82,190
  - Density: 48.12/km^{2} (124.6/sq mi)
- Time zone: UTC+4:30 (Afghanistan Standard Time)

Dara-i Sufi Payin District is a district in Samangan Province, Afghanistan, and it has an eponymous district center. It was created in 2005 from Darah Sof District.

== Location ==
The district is surrounded by five other districts. Dara-i Sufi Payin is bordered by Feroz Nakhchir District to the northeast, Aybak District to the east, Dara-i Sufi Bala District to the south, Kishindih District to the west, and Charkint District to the northwest. Kishindih and Charkint district are in Balkh Province, with all other districts in Samangan Province.
