= Balahesar =

- Village
- Location in Afghanistan
- Coordinates: 35°59′2″N 67°28′9″E
- Country: Afghanistan
- Province: Samangan Province
- Time zone: + 4.30

Balahesar is a village in Samangan Province, in northern Afghanistan. It is located approximately 80 kilometres southwest of Samangan (Aybak).

== See also ==
- Samangan Province
