= Baba Qanbar =

- Village
- Location in Afghanistan
- Coordinates: 36°3′0″N 68°11′0″E
- Country: Afghanistan
- Province: Samangan Province
- Time zone: + 4.30

Baba Qanbar is a village in Samangan Province, in northern Afghanistan. It is located in an isolated part of Samangan Province in a valley framed by rugged mountains all around it. It is located approximately 50 kilometres (31 mi) southeast of Samangan (Aybak). Fields are located around the village in an otherwise barren area to provide the locals with a food supply.

== See also ==
- Samangan Province
