= Aq Gonbaz =

- Village
- Location in Afghanistan
- Coordinates: 36°30′36″N 68°5′46″E
- Country: Afghanistan
- Province: Samangan Province
- Time zone: + 4.30

Aq Gonbaz is a village in Samangan Province, in northern Afghanistan. It is located in the northern part of Samangan Province and lies in a dry, wide valley. Aq Gonbaz is accessed via a dirt track east of the A76 highway, to the northeast of Hazrat e Soltan.

== See also ==
- Samangan Province
