= Asiabad =

- Village
- Location in Afghanistan
- Coordinates: 36°23′40″N 67°53′23″E
- Country: Afghanistan
- Province: Samangan Province
- Time zone: + 4.30

Asiabad is a village in Samangan Province, in northern Afghanistan. It lies along the A76 highway, to the immediate south of Hazrat e Soltan.

== See also ==
- Samangan Province
