= Koh e Haj e Kushtah =

Hindu Kush range in Afghanistan

Koh-e Haji Kushtah
- (Dari: کوه حاجی کشته)
- Location within Afghanistan

Highest point
- Elevation: 2,158 m (7,080 ft)
- Parent peak: Hindu Kush
- Coordinates: 35°41′41.6″N 67°49′51.1″E

Geography
- Location: Samangan province, Afghanistan
- Parent range: Hindu Kush

Koh-e Haji Kushtah (Dari: کوه حاجی کشته; mountain with aromatic pines) is a 2,158-meter high mountain of the Hindu Kush Range in Samangan province, Afghanistan.
