= Dalkhaki =

- Village
- Location in Afghanistan
- Coordinates: 36°20′45″N 67°57′18″E
- Country: Afghanistan
- Province: Samangan Province
- Time zone: + 4.30

Dalkhaki is a village in Samangan Province, in northern Afghanistan. It lies 10 miles northwest of Aibak at an elevation of 3015 feet. The Tashkurgan River flows nearby, where it cuts an east–west ridge. It had a reported 120 families in the 1979 census.

== See also ==
- Samangan Province
