= Asiabadus =

Scientific classification
- Domain: Eukaryota
- Kingdom: Animalia
- Phylum: Arthropoda
- Subphylum: Chelicerata
- Class: Arachnida
- Order: Araneae
- Infraorder: Araneomorphae
- Family: Gnaphosidae
- Genus: Asiabadus; Roewer, 1961
- Species: A. asiaticus

Binomial name
- Asiabadus asiaticus (Charitonov, 1946)

Genus of spiders

Asiabadus is a monotypic genus of Asian ground spiders containing the single species, Asiabadus asiaticus. It was first described by Carl Friedrich Roewer in 1961, and has only been found in Central Asia and Afghanistan. It is named after Asiabad, a province in Afghanistan where they were first found, but it has been misspelled as "Asiadab" in generic and species headings.
