= Ab Khvorak-e Pa'in =

- Village
- Location in Afghanistan
- Coordinates: 35°30′16″N 67°45′35″E
- Country: Afghanistan
- Province: Samangan Province
- Time zone: + 4.30

Ab Khvorak-e Pa'in is a small village in Samangan Province, in northern Afghanistan. It is located in the very south of Samangan Province, about 200 miles northwest of Kabul. Several fields are located in the vicinity to provide the locals with food supply in this isolated village.

== See also ==
- Samangan Province
