= Besh Qol =

- Village
- Location in Afghanistan
- Coordinates: 35°55′0″N 68°14′42″E
- Country: Afghanistan
- Province: Samangan Province
- Time zone: + 4.30

Besh Qol is a village in Samangan Province, in northern Afghanistan. It is located approximately 50 kilometres west of Pol-e-Khomri.

== See also ==
- Samangan Province
