= Band-e Sareq =

- Village
- Location in Afghanistan
- Coordinates: 36°6′43″N 67°20′4″E
- Country: Afghanistan
- Province: Samangan Province
- Time zone: + 4.30

Band-e Sareq is a village in Samangan Province, in northern Afghanistan. It is located in the western part of Samangan Province, approximately 30 kilometres northeast of Chamchal.

== See also ==
- Samangan Province
