= Pomegranate production in Afghanistan =

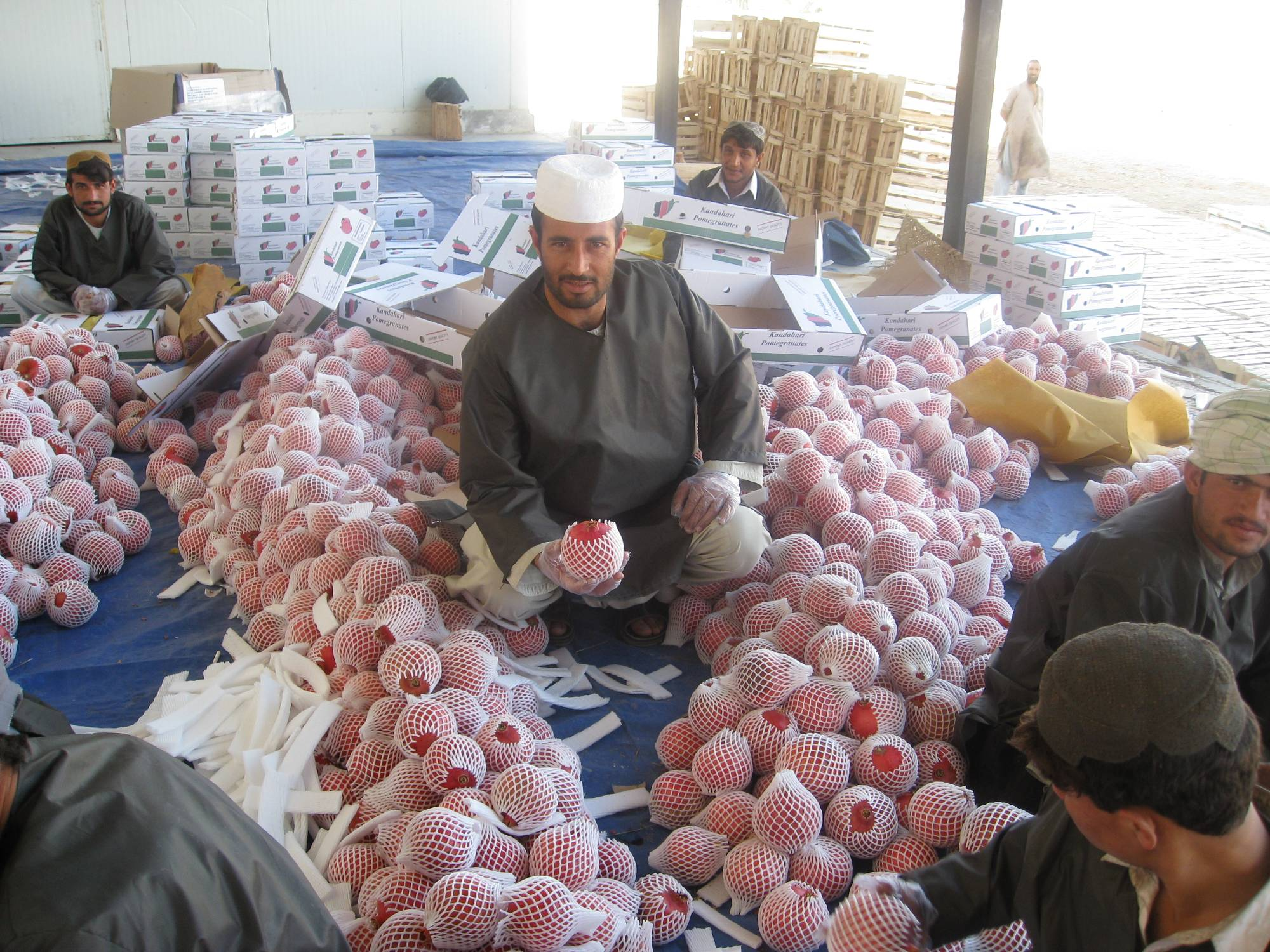
Pomegranates processing in Afghanistan

Pomegranate production in Afghanistan is a significant contributor to the country's agricultural economy, which is believed to have existed since ancient time. Pomegranates are a major fruit crop in a number of provinces, particularly in Kandahar, Helmand, Wardak, Ghazni, Paktia, Farah, Kapisa and Balkh, and are the source of the livelihoods of thousands of people.

Afghanistan is known as the country of the pomegranate fruit in view of not only its conventional methods of cultivation but also for the quality of the landraces grown.

== History ==
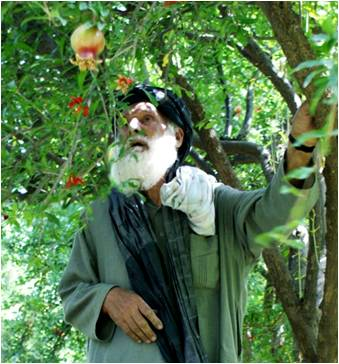
A farmer inspecting his fruits in the Arghandab District of Kandahar Province

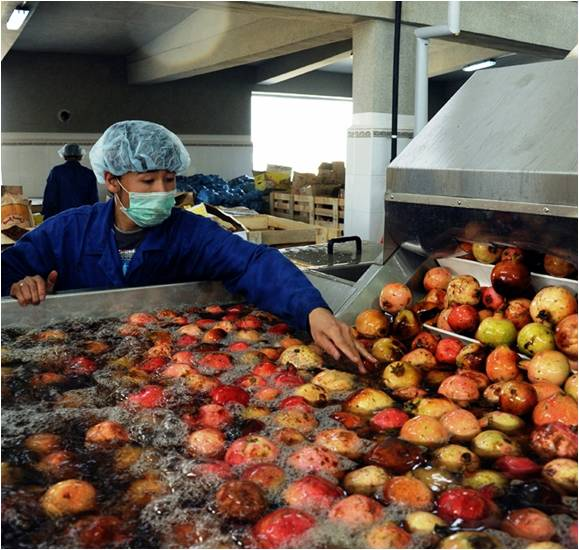
Pomegranates being washed in Kabul

Some leading botanists believe that Afghanistan is the cradle of world pomegranate production. Afghanistan has more varieties of pomegranate trees than anywhere else in the world.

Since the 1970s, political turmoil and wars have ravaged the country; this has had a serious effect on exporting the fruit to its biggest markets in Pakistan and India.

Since the end of the war, there has been a re-emergence in the pomegranate industry in Afghanistan. In 2009, hundreds of thousand of pomegranate trees were planted and the nation exported some 50,000 tons of the fruit. In October 2009 a £6 million juice factory was constructed in Kabul to make juice concentrate from the fruit as it becomes more commercially viable; increasing demand on the world market has seen local market prices rise from 34p a kilogram to £1 a kilogram since 2009.

In 2010 the new Afghanistan–Pakistan Transit Trade Agreement (APTTA) was signed between Afghanistan and Pakistan, which permits Afghan traders to export local agricultural produce by road to Indian the markets via the Wagah border post.

== International demand ==
Some people have speculated that an increase in Afghan fruit production towards a more international market would be the best way to combat opium production in the country. Gradually the international market for Afghan pomegranates is increasing with demand from overseas. In 2010, Afghanistan began exporting the fruit to Carrefour in Dubai. This has created significant competition there among their Turkish and North African counterparts as the Afghan product is said to be larger, redder and juicier. Carrefour has also placed a demand for Afghan pomegranates in other stores in countries in the Middle East.

It was reported in 2010 that Pomegreat has entered into a £3 million deal with Omaid Bahar, a Kabul-based company, to buy pomegranate juice from Afghanistan. This is said to benefit around 50,000 Afghan farmers.

However, international demand for Afghan pomegranates is still in its infancy; the majority of the U.S. domestic supply for instance comes from the San Joaquin Valley, Israel, Turkey, Lebanon, Greece and Mexico.

== Product ==
Pomegranates contain high levels of antioxidants, and protect cells from damage by compounds called free radicals. They are also reported to protect against certain types of cancer and lower blood pressure. Afghan pomegranates in comparison to the same fruit from other places are said to be larger (jumbo), sweeter and redder.

These are the best pomegranates you'll ever see in your life, they are the biggest, they are the reddest and they taste great.

— USAID

They are increasingly becoming consumed in Europe and North Africa as a health food and for its juicy, sweet taste. USAID has also described pomegranates grown in the northern Khulm River basin in the north of the country to be some of "the finest in Afghanistan". Adam Pritchard, the Chief Executive of Pomegreat has described the Afghan pomegranate as "the best in the world" and Afghanistan as their "spiritual home". Its ranking among fruits grown in the country is reported to be second, the first being grapes.

== Production ==
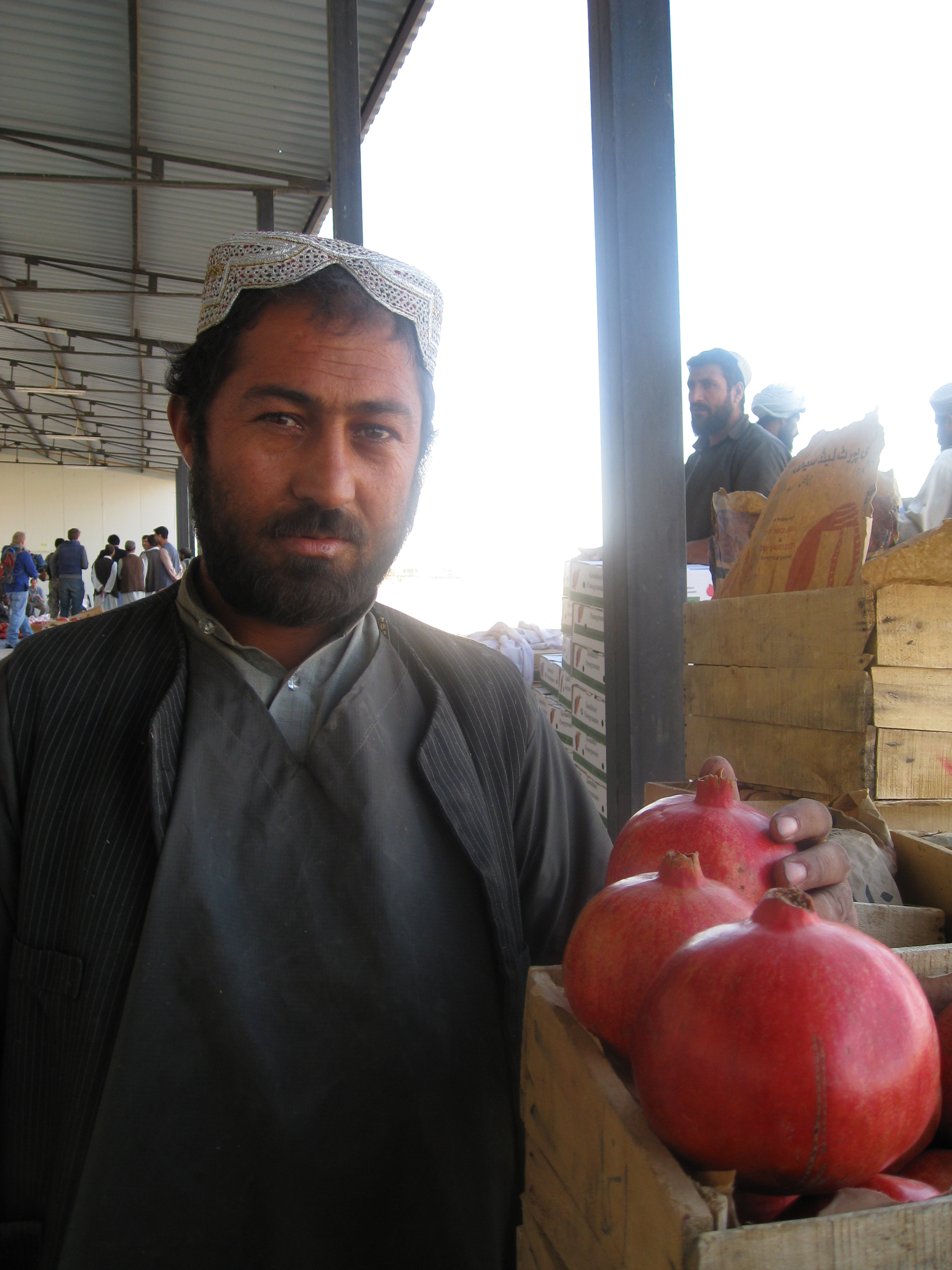
Jumbo size ruby-red "Kandahari" pomegranates

The main production area of pomegranates is in the Kandahar Province, where around 15,000 ha (37,000 acres) of land is under pomegranate cultivation. Its production per ha of land was also very high in the Dand and Arghandab districts of the province with yield of 344 kg/ha and 760 kg/ha respectively. The variety of pomegranate grown in Kandahar is known as the jumbo, ruby-red "Kandahari" variety, while the seedless variety is known as Badana, which is good for eating or converting into juices.

== Annual fair ==
Because of its popularity and demand for exports, the World Pomegranate Fair is an annual event in Afghanistan. Such an event, which is the meeting place for producers, buyers, packaging, logistics, and cold storage technology companies, equipment vendors, international experts on pomegranate production and processing and government agencies, is the road show that will bring to fore "the Afghan pomegranate industry, create new business opportunities, and benefit the people of Afghanistan." The harvesting period usually start from end of September through November.

== See also ==
- Economy of Afghanistan
