= Abdul Wahidi =

Afghani almond brand

Abdul Wahidi or Abdul Bedi is a variety of almonds, grown mainly in Afghanistan. The river valleys of the Khulm River in northern Afghanistan, particularly Balkh province, Samangan province and Kunduz province grow Abdul Wahidi almonds in abundance. Balkh province is said to grow the finest Abdul Wahidi almonds in the world. The Haji Moh area is a known centre of productivity by the Abdul Wahidi firm. Abdul Wahidi nuts are characteristically yellow in color.
