= Abdan-e Shebaqli =

- Village
- Location in Afghanistan
- Coordinates: 36°41′52″N 68°1′7″E
- Country: Afghanistan
- Province: Samangan Province
- Time zone: + 4.30

Abdan-e Shebaqli is a small village in Samangan Province, in northern Afghanistan. It is located east of Kholm by road.

== See also ==
- Samangan Province
