= Khulm River =

Coordinates: 36.766007°N 67.702446°E

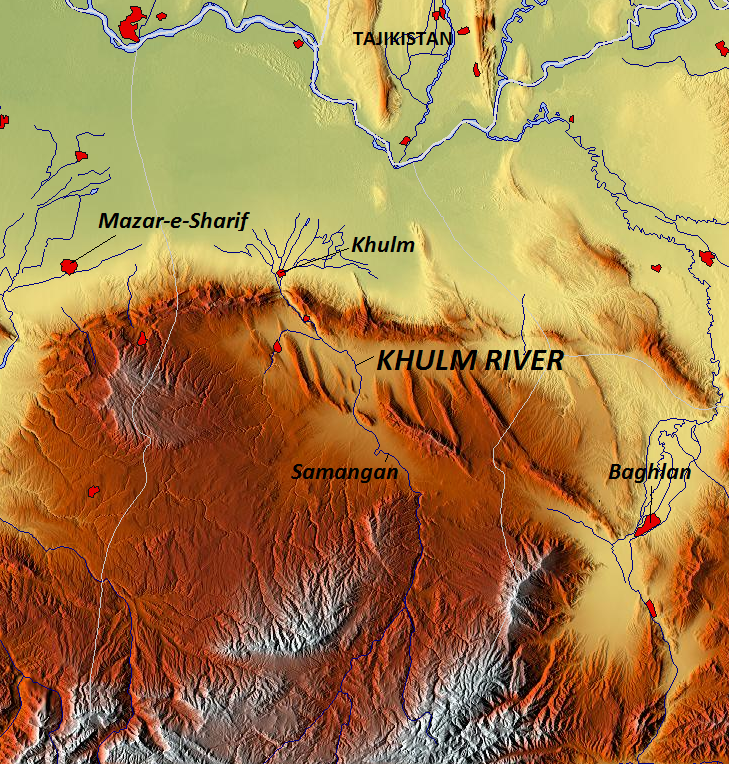

Location
- Country: Afghanistan

Physical characteristics
- Source
  - location: Kara-Kotal pass
  - elevation: 3,600 m (11,800 ft)
- Mouth
  - location: Amu Darya River
- Length: 230 km (140 mi)
- Basin size: 8,400 km^{2} (3,200 sq mi)

The Khulm River (Darya-i Khulm; alternate spelling: Kholm; alternate name: Tashqurghan River) is a river of north-central Afghanistan. In its lower course, it passes through Khulm and Haybak in Balkh Province. The Khulm is a tributary to the Oxus basin. Its source is south of the city of Khulm and it passes through the city of Samangan and Samangan Province. The Khulm River forms the western border of Kunduz Province.

== Geography ==
The mountains are characterized as rocky aridity as they extend from the Koh-i-Baba to Khulm River. On occasion, the landscape turns into trenched valleys engulfed with vegetation. The river rocks are composed of sandstone and limestone.

The Khulm River is one of the tributaries of the Amu Darya River, a major river in Central Asia. It is known as a "blind river" or "natural river" as it dries up due to local use within its basin boundary and does not reach the Amu Darya, except during exceptional high flow years. The Khulm River originates in the Kara-Kotal pass and flows through gorges and then emerges into a wide valley near the Tashkurgan town. The river raising at an elevation of 3,600 m has a total length of about 230 km. It drains a catchment area of 8,400 km^{2} with the annual runoff estimates varying from 58.2 to 67 million m^{3} by different assessors. The road between Kabul and Mazar-e-Sharif follows the course of the river. At the junction of the Bamian and Badakhshan routes, the Khulm River emerges from the mountains by the town of Kholm.

The entire Khulm water is used up for irrigation before it can reach the Oxus. In 1896, Keane wrote of the countryside's desert encroachment, causing the Khulm River as it passes from the Kara-koh hills to no longer reach the Oxus.

== Agriculture ==
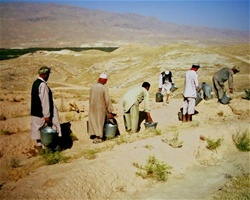
Pistachio farmers near the banks of the Khulm

The banks of the Khulm River are rich agricultural areas with rolling green hills at the side of the valleys it passes through. Many farmers in this region of Afghanistan are dependent upon the river for agriculture, particularly fruits. The Khulm is said to produce the world's finest Satar Bayee, Khairuddin Bayee and Abdul Wahidi almonds, pistachio nuts and Afghanistan's finest pomegranates.

== Flood control ==
Near Khulm, there are extensive orchards on the banks of the river. IDEA-NEW has been responsible for implementing a new program to prevent the orchards from flooding in Khulm District, protecting some 500 hectares of orchards from floods. The first phase was completed in winter 2009 with the erection of a 975 metre long protection wall and in 2010 550 metre long gabion protection walls were built on both sides of the Khulm River benefiting 500 families. The project has created some 6,900 days of employment for local workers combined and generating an income of US$99,362 for the labourers who were trained in gabion weaving to be implemented along the river banks. Previously the locals living along the river would attempt to mitigate the river against flooding with sandbanks which failed poorly.
