= Satar Bayee =

Almond brand

Satar Bayee is a variety of almonds, grown mainly in Afghanistan. The river valleys of the Khulm River in northern Afghanistan, particular Balkh Province and Samangan Province grow Satar Bayee almonds in abundance and is said to grow the finest Satar Bayee almonds in the world. Satar Bayee is governed by the Mazar Dried Fruit Association.
