= Hazrati Sultan District =

Hazrati Sultan حضرت سلطان
- District
- Location in Afghanistan
- Coordinates: 36.3900°N 68.1908°E
- Country: Afghanistan
- Province: Samangan
- Time zone: + 4.30

Hazrati Sultan District is a district in Samangan Province, Afghanistan. It is also locally known as Azrat Sultan. In 2019 the estimated population was 45,962.
