= Takht-e Rostam =

Archaeological site in Haibak, Afghanistan

Coordinates: 36°14′44.56″N 68°1′19.68″E

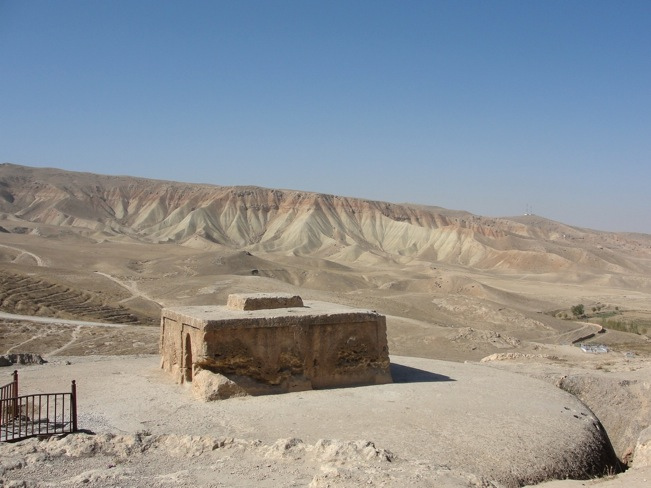
- "Harmika", a building that once held relics of the Buddha

- Location within Afghanistan

Takht-e Rostam (Dari: تخت رستم) or Stupa of Takht-e Rostam is a stupa Buddhist monastery complex 2 km south of the town of Haibak, Afghanistan. Built in the 3rd-4th century AD while the area was part of the Kushano-Sasanian Kingdom the complex is carved entirely from the bedrock and "consists of five chambers, two of them sanctuaries. One of them has a domed ceiling with an elaborate lotus leaf decoration. On an adjacent hill is the stupa, surmounted by a harmika, with several more rough caves around the base. A hoard of Ghaznavid coins was found by chance in one of the caves."

== Cultural significance ==
Following the Muslim conquests of Afghanistan the original purpose of the monastery was lost. Instead the site was incorporated into Persian mythology in the story of Rostam and Sohrab which forms part of the 10th-century Persian epic Shahnameh by the Persian poet Ferdowsi. In the story it is said that Rostam supposedly traveled to the Kingdom of Samangan and stayed with the king at Takht-e Rostam. In 2021, the Afghan government renovated the site and built a hall for tourists.

== Gallery ==
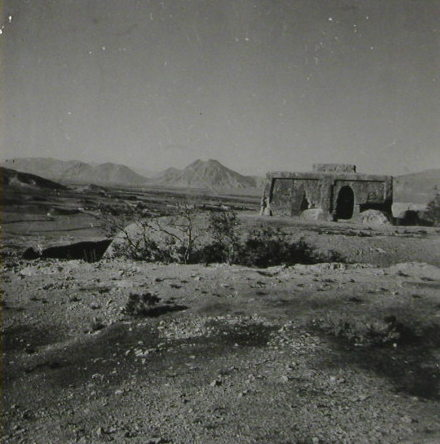
Harmika in 1939

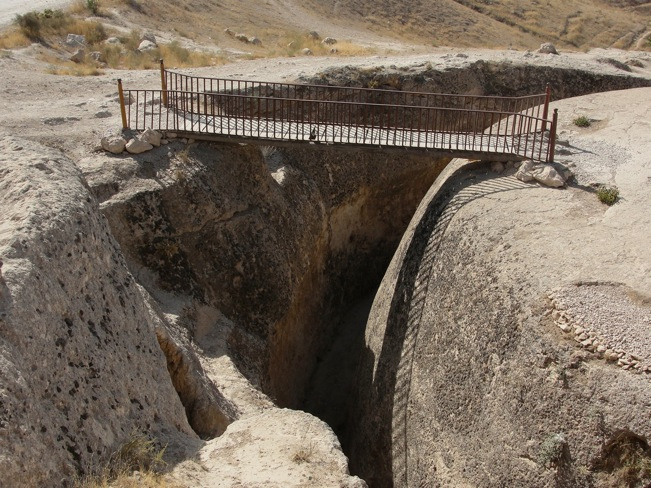
A new bridge added to the site.

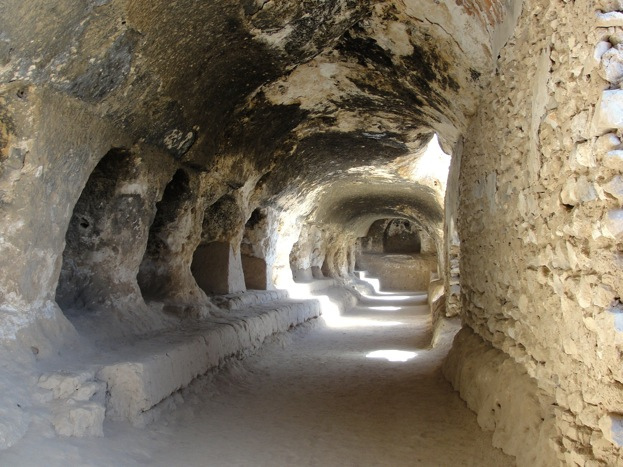
The cave system inside Takht-e Rostam
