= Varni =

Varni may refer to:

- Kshullak, Jain monks
- Varni (surname)
- Varni (Telangana), village in Nizamabad district
- Varni, Estonia, village
- Warini, European tribe of the Roman era and early Middle Ages
