= Khuram Wa Sarbagh District =

Khuram Wa Sarbagh خرم و سارباغ
- District
- Location in Afghanistan
- Coordinates: 35.9113°N 68.2862°E
- Country: Afghanistan
- Province: Samangan Province

Government
  - District Chief: Maulvi Muhammad Feroz Farooqi

Population (2023)
  - Total: 50,000
- Time zone: UTC+4:30 (AFT)

Khuram Wa Sarbagh District is a district in Samangan Province of Afghanistan. It has an estimated population of around 50,000 people.

== Villages ==
The following is a list of some of the villages in Khoram Sarbagh district.

- Abdul Malek
- Chaharng
- Dakhelzo
- Habsh
- Kende Kalan
- Pas Hessar
- Sar Meng Pas Hesar
- Zir Meng Pas Hesar

== See also ==
- Districts of Afghanistan
