= Darah Sof District =

Darah Sof Dari: دره صوف}
- District
- Location in Afghanistan
- Coordinates: 35.7508°N 67.6662°E
- Country: Afghanistan
- Province: Samangan Province

Population (2003)
  - Total: 107,000
- Time zone: UTC+04:30 (Afghanistan Time)

Darah Sof (Dari: دره صوف) was a district of Samangan Province in Afghanistan. It was located about 130 kilometres (81 mi) from the city of Samangan and 200 kilometres (120 mi) from the city of Mazar-i-Sharif, in Balkh Province. In 2005, the district was split into Dara-i Sufi Bala District or Darah Sof Balla District (the upper valley), and Dara-i Sufi Payin District or Darah Sof Payan District (the lower valley).

A large part of Darah Sof is surrounded by hills, where a type of wheat called Lalm (للم) is grown. A river in Darah Sof called Qalah Sarkori makes the area very lush and fertile. Many of the residents have installed small turbines to extract power from this river.

There were approximately 107,000 residents in Darah Sof, with the majority of Hazara ethnicity. The district has one high school, eleven elementary schools, and two religious schools.

On 15 March 1979, an uprising against the Democratic People's Party of Afghanistan occurred. A work project is currently planned to improve the road between Darah Sof and Mazar Sharif city. This project is funded by the Correa government, with working capital of $60 million.

== Etymology ==
The name Darah Sof may be rendered in many, many, different ways in western languages. Some examples are: Dar-i-Suf, Dare Suf, Darya ye Suf; the preceding with Sof instead of Suf.

== See also ==
- Valleys of Afghanistan
- Samangan Province
