= Shebartoo =

Shebartoo شیبرتو/شبرتو , Dasht-e Shebartu: Sebartoo; Shebarto; Shebartu; Shibarto; Shibartoo; Sebartu; Sibartoo
- Plain
- Coordinates (Centre): 34.781111°N 67.490278°E
- Country: Afghanistan
- Province: Bamyan Province
- District: Shahidan (Shaidan) district

Shebartoo (also Shibartu, Shibartoo, Shibarto, Sebartoo, Shebarto, Shebartu, Sebartu, Sibartoo), (Dari/Hazaragi language: شیبرتو/شبرتو, Dasht-e Shebartu) is a plain in Shahidan (Shaidan) district, west of Bamiyan city, the provincial capital of Bamyan Province. The Shebartoo lies on the Bamiyan — Band-e Amir — Yakawlang road, about half-way between the Bamiyan valley and the Band-e Amir lakes.

== Villages ==
The seven villages located on the Shebartoo are:

- Pirdad : پیرداد
- Habashi : حبشی
- Eikhtiyaran : اختیاران
- Kaj : کج
- Goombazi :گومبزی
- Sarma Ghol : سرما قول
- Bum-e Shibar : بوم شیبر

== Population ==
The people who live on the Shebartoo are known as the Shebartoo Hazara.

== Airport ==
The gravel strip known as Shebartoo Airport, which is also called Bamiyan Airport (ICAO: OABN; IATA: BIN), is the main airport for Bamiyan Province.
