= IDEA-NEW =

USAID program in Afghanistan

IDEA-NEW is an acronym for Incentives Driving Economic Alternatives for the North, East and West, and is a United States Agency for International Development (USAID)-funded program in Afghanistan. It works with farmers to grow different crops in provinces where poppies are frequently grown for opium production and collaborates with Afghan governmental bodies such as the Ministry of Agriculture, Irrigation and Livestock, the Ministry of Women's Affairs and the Ministry of Counter Narcotics. The fact that the program consults with local Afghans "at every stage of its operations" and uses almost all Afghan people on staff makes this project both unusual, and according to Trudy Rubin, more successful than other civilian-aid programs backed by the United States.

== History ==
IDEA-NEW took place between March 2, 2009 and March 1, 2014. The project was funded by the United States government with a $150 million budget and intended to operate in less-violent areas of Afghanistan. A contractor, Development Alternatives Inc. leads the project.

The project built a farmer's market in Qala-e-Naw. They also rehabilitated the Sakha Canal in the Baharak District, starting work in 2011.
