= Shahidan =

Shahidan/Shaidan SHAHIDAN / شهیدان
- District
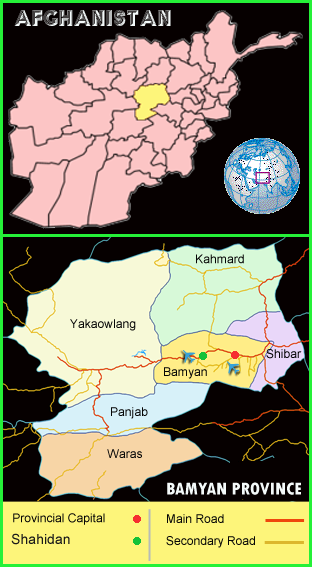
- Shahidan/Shaidan District Map

- Location in Afghanistan
- Coordinates: 34.791914°N 67.588577°E
- Country: Afghanistan
- Province: Bamyan Province
- District: Shahidan (Shaidan) district

Shahidan / شهیدان (also Shaidan, Dari/Hazaragi language: شیدان) is located in Bamiyan., about 260 km (160 mi) northwest of Kabul and west of Bamiyan city, the provincial capital of Bamiyan Province. A large place between two famous mountain ranges Koh-i-Baba and Hindu Kush. Shahidan had a population of 25,500. Also a large part of Shahidan people are as refugees outside the country, especially in Iran and Pakistan.
In Shahidan there are 72 villages, and also some of the villages and inhabitant of Sayghan and Yakaolang are attached to Shahidan than their districts (Sayghan and Yakaolang), all constitute the eight Taghab (Taghab = larger than village) of Shahidan .
The eight Tagabs of Shahidan:

- Barikye (of) Shahidan
- Shaidan or Shahidan
- Shebartoo
- Gharghanatoo
- Achaghol
- Akh-shay
- unknown
- Gonbad

Bamiayn and Shahidan were razed by the Taliban as they fled the region in late 2001 and earlier.
