= Feroz Nakhchir District =

District of Samangan Province, Afghanistan

Feroz Nakhchir District is a district of Samangan Province, Afghanistan. It formerly belonged to Balkh Province and shifted in 2005. The estimated population in 2019 was 14,494.
