= Varni (surname) =

Varni is an Italian surname. Notable people with the surname include:

- Antonio Varni (1841–1908), Italian painter
- Giuseppe Varni (1902–1965), Polish-born Italian stage and film actor
- Santo Varni (1807–1885), Italian sculptor
