= Samangan Province =

Province of Afghanistan

Samangan سمنگان
- Province
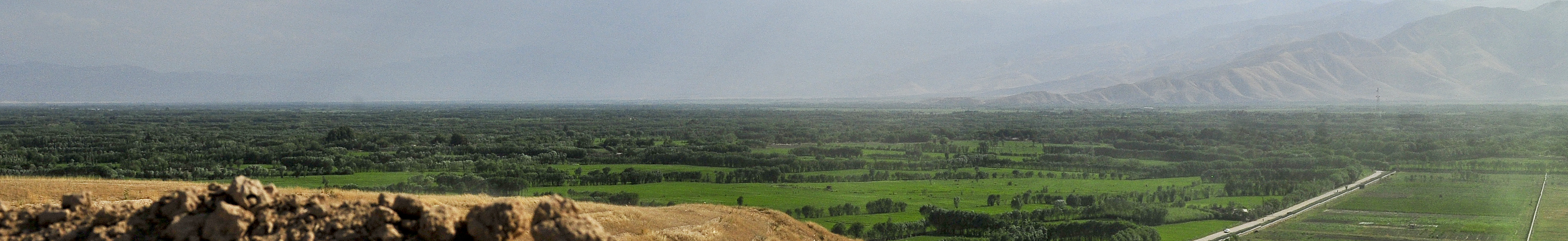
- Samangan Province

- Location of Samangan within Afghanistan
- Country: Afghanistan
- Capital: Aybak

Government
  - Governor: Vacant/Unknown
  - Deputy Governor: Abdul Manan

Area
  - Total: 13,438 km^{2} (5,188 sq mi)

Population (2021)
  - Total: 438,235
  - Density: 32.612/km^{2} (84.464/sq mi)
- Time zone: UTC+04:30 (Afghanistan Time)
- Postal code: 20xx
- ISO 3166 code: AF-SAM
- Main language(s): Persian, Uzbeki and Turkmeni

Samangan (Pashto, (Note: Pashto pronunciation: [sa.maŋˌgɑn]) Dari: (Note: Dari pronunciation: [sä.mäŋ.ɡɑ́ːn]) سمنگان) is one of the 34 provinces of Afghanistan, located north of the Hindu Kush mountains in the central part of the country. The province covers 11,218 square kilometres (4,331 mi^{2}), and is surrounded by Sar-e Pol Province in the west, Balkh in the north, Baghlan in the east and Bamyan in the south.

Samangan province is divided into 7 districts and contains 674 villages. It has a population of about 325,000, which is multi-ethnic and mostly a rural society. The city of Aybak serves as the provincial capital.

In 2021, the Taliban gained control of the province during the 2021 Taliban offensive.

== History ==
The earliest known history of the province is linked to the identification of the Samangan by Aoros Ptolemy as the place of the Varni or Uarni and the fortified city of Samangan on the banks of the Khulm River identical to the Bhaktria regi on the Dargydus river south east of Zariaspa. The ruins found here established the city's founding by Eukratides, the King of Bactria. It was then known as Edrisi the size of the Khulm city.

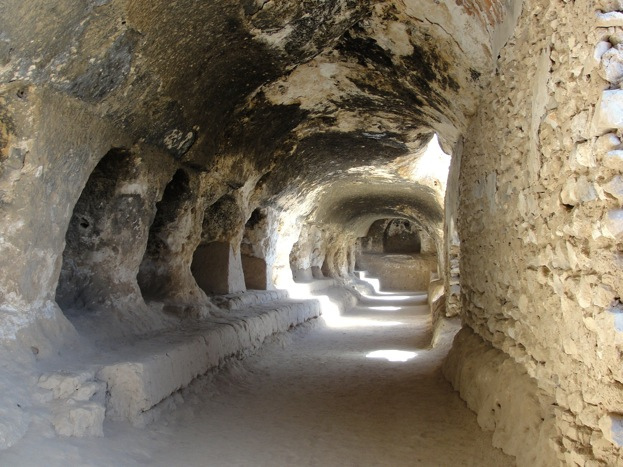
Below Buddhist stupa is a series of five caves, former monks' cells for meditation.

Historicity of the Samangan town dates to the time of the Kushan Empire during the 4th and 5th centuries when it was a famous Buddhist centre. Witness to this period is seen now in the form of ruins at a place called the Takht-e Rostam, which is located 3 km from the town on a hilltop. Arabs and Mongols came to this place when it was already famous as a Buddhist religious centre. Aibak was the name given to this place when, during the medieval period, caravans used to stop here.

Afghanistan has various archaeological sites where caves were hewn out of rocks and inhabited by Buddhists. "One of the most spectacular sites is that of Takth i Raustam, near Samangan (Haybak), north of Hindu Kush passes. It includes a complex of stupa with monastery, hewn out of the rock. Other caves have been found near Jalalabad and at the site of Humay Qal'a southwest of Ghazni.

The Buddhist in Takth i Raustam here in the form of a mound, located on the hilltop, represents the earliest link to the evolution of Buddhist architecture in Afghanistan

The area was conquered by the Hephthalites followed by the Saffarids who brought Islam. The Samanids took it and controlled it until the Ghaznavids rose to power in the 10th century, they were replaced by the Ghorids. After the Mongol invasion the Timurids took possession.

Between the early 16th century and the mid-18th century, the Province was ruled by the Khanate of Bukhara. It was given to Ahmad Shah Durrani by Murad Beg of Bukhara after a treaty of friendship was reached in or about 1750, and became part of the Durrani Empire. It was ruled by the Durranis followed by the Barakzai dynasty, and was untouched by the British during the three Anglo-Afghan wars that were fought in the 19th and 20th centuries. It remained peaceful for about one hundred years until the 1980s Soviet–Afghan War.

=== Recent history ===
After the Afghan Civil War, the town of Darra Souf in Samangan Province was occupied by Ustad Mohammad Mohaqiq and the Taliban in late 1999. The Taliban forces gained control of the area from January to March 2000 including nearby Sar-e-Pol and Baghlan provinces, where they were reported to have massacred an unknown number of civilians.

On May 8, 2000, several men from Baghlan were driven up to the Robotak Pass in Samangan province, approximately 20 miles north of the city of Samangan (100 miles south of Mazar-i-Sharif) and were executed, later found by local farmers in shallow graves which the Taliban had dug for them.

After the removal of the Taliban government in late 2001, the Karzai administration took over control of Afghanistan. In the meantime, the International Security Assistance Force (ISAF) established a Provincial Reconstruction Team (PRT) in the province. After getting training by ISAF, the Afghan National Security Forces (ANSF) are providing security for the population of the province.

The province has a fairly good security situation, with the United Nations Department for Safety and Security (UNDSS) reporting a calm and stable condition. However, on 15 February 2011 an ISAF peacekeeper from Finland was killed in a roadside bombing near Samangan City, and on 14 July 2012, Ahmed Khan Samangani, a member of the National Assembly of Afghanistan, was killed when a suicide bomber infiltrated his daughter's wedding party in the city of Samangan. The bomb also killed the provincial head of the National Directorate of Security (NDS), and 13 other guests, and 60 were injured, including senior police and army commanders. The deputy provincial governor, Ghulam Sarkhi, claimed that the death toll was likely to rise.

== Geography ==
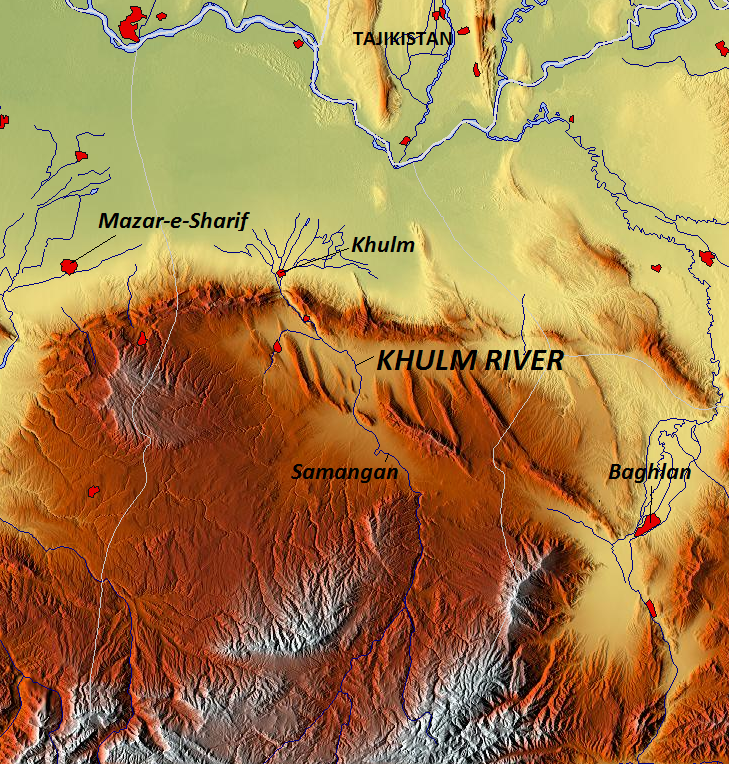
Map of the Khulm River basin

Samangan is located in northern central Afghanistan, delimited by Baghlan province in the east, Bamyan in the south, Sar-e-Pul in the south-west and Balkh province in the northwest. Samangan encompasses an area of 11218 km2 consisting 59% of mountainous terrain, 21% of semi mountainous terrain, 12% of flat land, 4.8% of semi-flat land and the balance 2.2% is unclassified land.

Some parts of the province are characterised by distinctive rolling hills and mountains and rich green valleys. The provincial jurisdiction is spread over seven administrative districts, with Samangan City as its capital. This town is located on the banks of the Khulm River, in the valley formed below the junction of Hindu Kush mountains and the Central Asian Steppe; the valley has very fertile agricultural land. The highest mountain ranges of the province thus lie to the southwest of the province, southwest of Samangan City. Only 12% of the provincial area consists of flat land. The city of Samangan lies in the Khulm River valley, with mountains to the west and east. It is located to the northwest of the city of Baghlan and about is 190 km (120 mi) north-west of the capital Kabul and the same distance south-east of Mazar-i-Sharif city.

Samangan Province has a long history of earthquakes which has led to the loss of thousands of people and their homes. In 1998, two earthquakes struck measuring 5.9 and 6.6 on the Richter scale, claiming some 6,000 lives along the border with Tajikistan. A series of earthquakes struck nearby Baghlan province on March 3, 2002, killing roughly 1,000 people. In April 2010 at least 11 people were killed and more than 70 injured when a 5.7 magnitude quake at a depth of 10 km struck the province. It damaged some 300 houses and killed hundreds of cattle, causing landslides which blocks some of the main roads.

== Administrative divisions ==
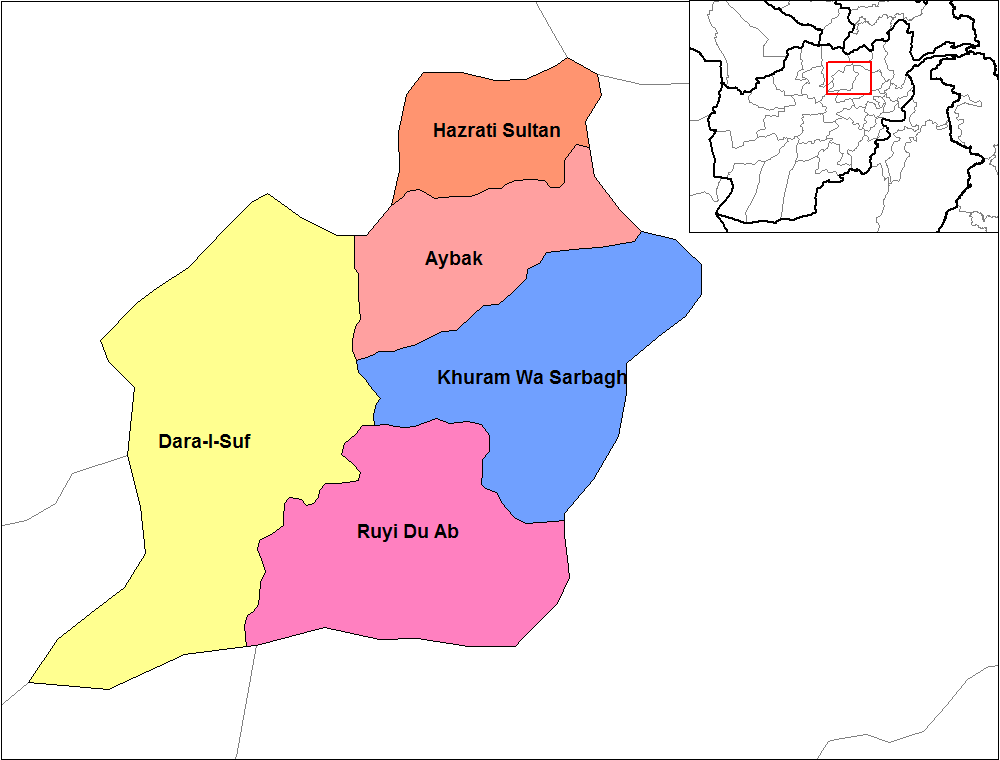
Map of the districts of Samangan as of January 2004, prior to the redrawing of provincial and district boundaries later that year

Current Map of the Districts of Samangan (as linked to on the Districts of Afghanistan page)

Districts of Samangan Province
District	Capital	Population	Area in km^{2}	Pop. density	Number of villages and ethnic groups
Aybak	Samangan	118,537	2,145	55	96 villages. 55% Uzbek, 35% Tajik, 5% Pashtun, 5% other.
Darah Sof Balla	Dari Suf Bala	73,072	2,283	32	146 villages. 100% Hazaras. Used to be part of Darah Sof District.
Darah Sof Payan	Dari Suf Payan	80,778	1,699	48	209 villages. Tajik 70%, Uzbek 30%. Used to be part of Darah Sof District.
Feroz Nakhchir	Feroz Nakhchir	14,747	930	16	22 villages. Mixed Pashtun and Tajik. Used to be part of Aybak District.
Hazrat Sultan	Hazrat Sultan	46,766	2,102	22	66 villages. MIxed Tajik, Pashtun, Arab, Uzbek.
Khuram Wa Sarbagh	Khuram Wa Sarbagh	45,039	1,815	25	52 villages. Uzbek, Tajik and Hazara.
Ruyi Du Ab	Ruyi	51,550	2,477	21	83 villages. Predominantly Hazaras (Tatar tribe).
Samangan		430,489	13,438	32	Majority Tajik and Uzbek, Minority Hazara and Pashtun

=== Towns and villages ===
According to Afghanistan's Ministry of Rural Rehabilitation and Development, the province has 674 villages.

- Abdan-e Shebaqli
- Ab Khvorak-e Bala
- Ab Khvorak-e Pa'in
- Aq Gonbaz
- Asiabad
- Baba Qanbar
- Balahesar
- Band-e Sareq
- Besh Qol
- Chahar Cheshmeh
- Chahar Deh
- Chahar Owlia
- Changiz
- Dagah
- Dahaneh-ye Shams od Din
- Dalkhaki
- Dehi
- Deh Mirdad
- Deh Now
- Do Ab
- Ghazni Gak
- Gozar
- Hasani
- Hazar Som
- Hazrat-e Soltan
- Heyratan
- Hezarmani
- Jan Bulaq
- Jeyretan
- Juy-ye Jadid
- Kaldar
- Katah Qeshlaq
- Khvajeh Hayat
- Khvajeh Zahed
- Kolowr va Dah Sil
- Kowkeh Bulaq
- Larghan
- Maschetak
- Na'ebabad
- Orlamesh
- Pir Nakhchir
- Qalacheh
- Qareh Aghach
- Qashaqeh
- Qaynar-e Bala
- Qaynar-e Pa'in
- Ru'i
- Sad Mardeh
- Samangan
- Sar-e Asia
- Sar-e Bum
- Sayyad
- Seyghanchi
- Shabashak
- Shahidan
- Sharik Yar
- Sorkh Abi
- Taghan Gozar
- Taqchi
- Towz Bulaq
- Werdaqamal
- Yangi Aregh

== Economy ==
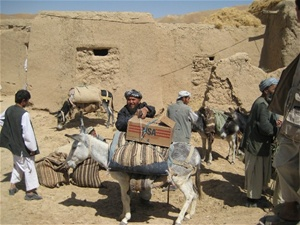
Villagers in Samangan province receiving food parcels

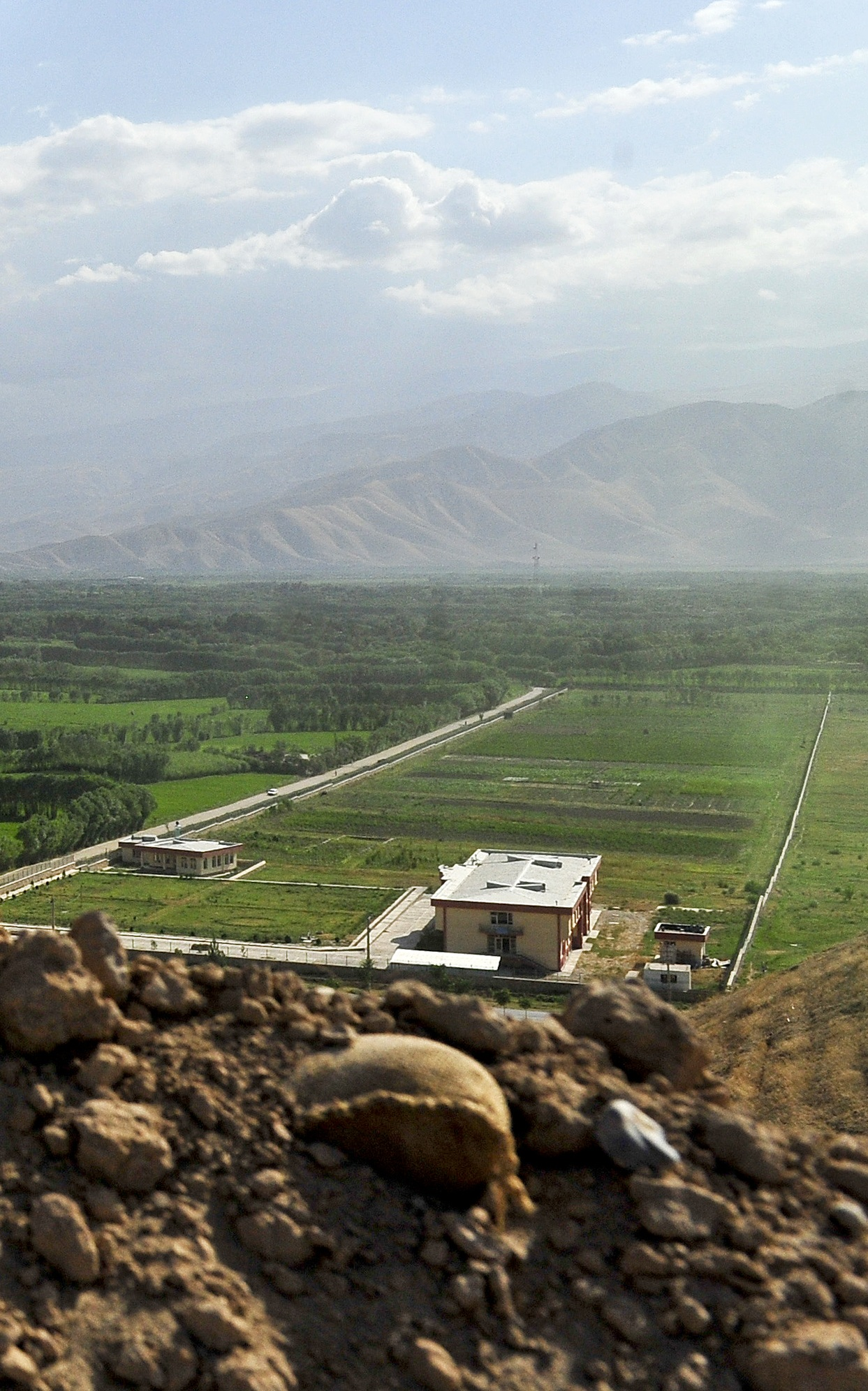
Flat agricultural fields with mountains in the background

Agriculture and some small scale mining are the main industries of the province. Economic condition of the people is very hard with nearly 12% households finding it difficult to meet the food requirements to sustain. This has resulted in allocations of food aid to the province.

In October 2010, the first dish-making factory run by women began operations. The women were trained for several months and now work in two shifts. During the last few years, thousands of other women have worked on a variety of different projects such as tailoring and carpet knitting.

=== Infrastructure ===
As of 2005, safe drinking water access is available to 7% of households (falls to a low of 4% in rural areas). However, some drinking water facility is available in some form to about 71% of households. Still many households have to travel for long hours to the nearest source of water.

Electricity supply is minimal, limited to only about 5% of the population with 80% supplied from government sources. The transport sector is still underdeveloped. Only 28% of roads are good for use by motorized traffic throughout the year with this percentage rising to 41% in some seasons. However roads are non-existent in 28% of the province.

Education is still in a nascent state of development with only 19% being literate, as of 2005, with literacy among men limited to 28% and literacy among women limited to a mere 10%; literacy among the Kuchis population is the least at about 3% of men only. There are 59 primary and secondary schools in the province with enrolment of 59,915 students. However, travelling distance to the schools varies, with primary schools being most accessible while High Schools involve about 10 km of travel.

As of 2005, basic health services maintained by the Ministry of Health were fairly developed with 6 health centres and 3 hospitals with a total of 60 beds. The health centres were well staffed with 21 doctors and 33 nurses.

Food security is a major issue since nearly 12% of the population receive less than the minimum daily caloric intake to sustain good health. Food consumption is poor in both rural and urban areas and as a result food aid has become essential.

From the security angle, the United Nations Department of Safety and Security (UNDSS) has reported security situation in the province calm and stable.

=== Mining ===
Marble export sustains Afghan economy. The marble is extracted and processed in 21 factories in the country, including the famous brown marble from Samangan province. This adds to the economy of the province.

=== Agriculture ===
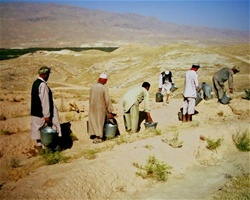
Pistachio farmers

The economy revolves around agriculture, with farmers in Samangan province cultivating grains, fruits, and nuts on the region's fertile river plains. The province of Samangan is second only to the northwestern Afghan province of Badghis in terms of pistachio production. As of 2005, 10 Agricultural cooperatives were functioning in the province with 665 enrolled members controlling an area of 5532 ha which brought prosperity to its members. The staple food crops grown in the province are wheat, barley and potato and flax. The horticultural or garden crops grown are grapes, pomegranates and other fruit and nut trees. Cash crops grown in a few villages were sesame, cotton and tobacco; and they are mostly in Dara-i-Soofi-Payin and Aybek districts; cotton was major crop in Hazrat-i-Sultan district while tobacco was produced on a large scale in the Roi-Do-Ab district. Use of fertilizers is also common among 60% of the on both field and garden crops Industries are almost non existent in the province, except for minor leather industry producing the karakul skin and a few small scale handicrafts producing rugs, shawls, jewellery and carpets.

Horse breeding also sustains the economy of the province as it caters particularly for the popular sport of buzkashi in Afghanistan. Buzkashi is a traditional Central Asian team sport played on horseback in Afghanistan, Uzbekistan, Tajikistan, Kyrgyzstan, northern Pakistan and Kazakhstan.

=== Irrigation ===
The agricultural economy of the province is further enhanced with irrigation facility provided to 21,242 ha. The irrigated areas deciphered from the land-cover maps, under a collaborative project of FAO, the United Nations Development Programme and the Afghan Geodesy and Cartography Head Office, Kabul are in Aybak, Samangan - 5,426 ha, Dara-I-Suf, Samangan - 4,149 ha, Hazrati Sult, Samangan -6,884 ha, Khuram Wa Sa, Samangan - 1,733 ha and Ruyi Du Ab, Samangan - 3,049 ha.

== Demography ==
=== Population ===
As of 2021, the total population of the province is about 438,000, which is predominately rural with only 7% living in urban centres.

=== Ethnicity, languages and religion ===
Estimated ethnolinguistic and -religious composition
Ethnicity	Tajik/ Farsiwan	Uzbek	Hazara	Others	Sources
Period	Tajik/ Farsiwan	Uzbek	Hazara	Others	Sources

2004–2021 (Islamic Republic)	40 – 65%	30 – 35%	<5 – 20%	<5%
2020 EU	1st	2nd	4th	∅ (Note: incl. Pashtun (3rd), Arab (5th), Tatar (6th) and Aimaq (7th).)
2018 UN	40 – 43%	30 – 35%	15 – 20%	∅ (Note: incl. Pashtun, Arab and Tatar.)
2015 CSSF (Note: Demographic information is based on data from 2015.)	65%	30%	5%	
2015 CP	∅	∅	∅	∅ (Note: incl. Pashtun, Turkmen, Tatar and "a minority" of Arab.)
2015 NPS	65%	30%	5%	
2011 PRT	majority		∅	∅
2011 USA	majority		∅	–

Legend:
- ∅: Ethnicity mentioned in source but not quantified
- –: Ethnicity not mentioned specifically
- Source abbreviations: Empirical sources: –, Government sources: CP – Colombo Plan, EU – European Union Agency for Asylum, PRT – Provincial Reconstruction Team of the United States government, UN – United Nations Assistance Mission in Afghanistan, Editorial sources: CSSF – Center for the Scientific Study of Families, NPS – Naval Postgraduate School, UCD – University of California, Davis, (Note: Produced at UCD as part of the Regional Rural Economic Regeneration Strategies subproject of the eAfghan Ag project, supported by USAID.) USA – United States Army

=== Education ===
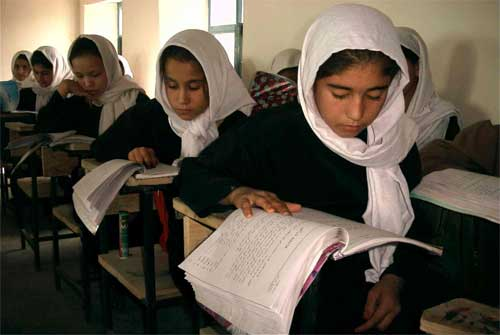
Samangan School

The overall literacy rate (6+ years of age) increased from 19% in 2005 to 27% in 2011. The overall net enrolment rate (6–13 years of age) increased from 37% in 2005 to 47% in 2011.

Owing to its relative isolation, Samangan province is underdeveloped with no energy infrastructure and has a high rate of illiteracy, although some students have access to education in neighbouring Mazari Sharif. Educational facilities in the province is at a low level with literacy rate recorded at only 19% for the province as a whole, with 28% literacy rate among men and a low of 10% among women. The Kuchi people are the least literate, recording a literacy rate of only 3%, that too among men only. The province has 159 primary and secondary schools with attendance of 59,915 students; 83% of schools are boys' schools with 68% students. While the village schools are within easy reach, the high schools are generally about 10 km away from the villages.

=== Health ===
Health services provided by the Ministry of Health are fairly basic with 6 health centres and 3 hospitals with 60 beds. They are reasonably well staffed with 21 doctors and 33 nurses. To cater to the pharmaceutical needs of the patients, there are 24 pharmacies, two are run by the government and the rest are privately owned. In 2006, two dozen women completed a midwifery course. The percentage of households with clean drinking water increased from 7% in 2005 to 18% in 2011. The percentage of births attended to by a skilled birth attendant fell from 29% in 2005 to 20% in 2011.

== Culture ==
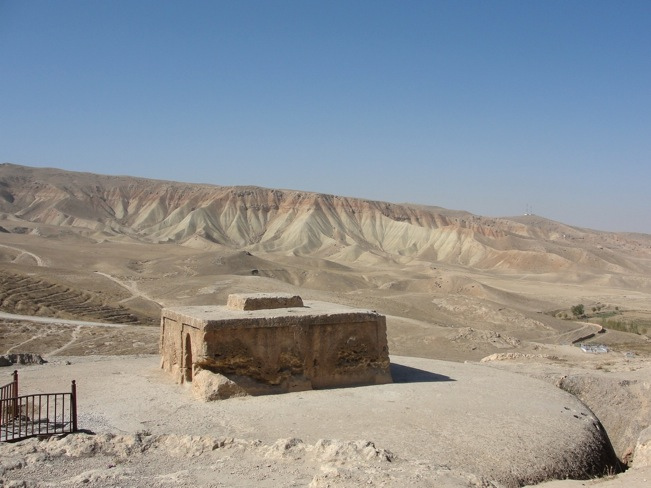
Remains of the Buddhist stupa and monastery on a hill above Samangan. Instead of being built up, it has been carved out of the rock so is completely below ground level

The historical cultural heritage in the province which is mainly at Samangan City, the provincial headquarters of Samangan are the Takt-e Rostam and the adjacent Buddhist caves and stupas on a top of hill.

Takht-i Rustam

Takht-i Rustam (Haibak), literal meaning the throne of Rustam, named after Rustam, a king in Persian mythology, is a hilltop settlement. It is dated to the 4th and 5th centuries of the Kushano-Sassanian period, which is corroborated by archaeological, architectural and numismatic evidence. It is located 3 km to the southwest of Samangan town. It is the location of a stupa-monastery complex which is fully carved into the mountain rock. The monastery of major Buddhist tradition of Theravada Buddhism, has five chambers, two are sanctuaries and one is a domed ceiling with an intricate lotus leaf beautification. In the adjacent hill is the stupa, which has a harmika, with several caves at its base. Above one of the caves, there is square building in which there are two conference halls; one is 22 metres square and the other is circular. In one of these caves, Archaeological excavations have revealed a cache of Ghaznavid coins. The Buddhist temples near the Takht are 10 numbers known locally as Kie Tehe.

Malek Cave

Yar Mohammad Malek cave in Roy Doaab district is a small canyon that consists of a big historical cave, believed to be endless. Many bones, silk clothes, and Islamic symbols were found in this district, but due to the erosion and landslide, the entrance of these places has disappeared. During the civil war, many of the artifacts were found by people who were displaced and lived in those caves.

Hazar Sum

Hazar Sum is another ancient Buddhist centre in north central Afghanistan where several caves have been found and in one of these caves a Buddhist stupa has been carved.

== Notable people ==
- Tahmina, princess of Samangan
- Sohrab, son of Rustam
