= Ruyi Du Ab District =

Ruyi Du Ab روی دوآب
- District
- Location in Afghanistan
- Coordinates: 35.6581°N 68.0478°E
- Country: Afghanistan
- Province: Samangan Province
- Time zone: + 4.30

Ruyi Du Ab District is a district in Samangan Province, northern Afghanistan. The estimated population in 2019 was 50,661.
