= Aybak, Samangan =

Aybak ایبک
- Provincial capital
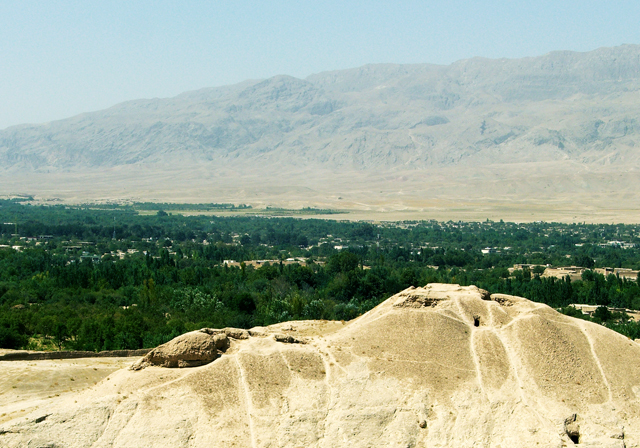
- Overview of Aybak valley

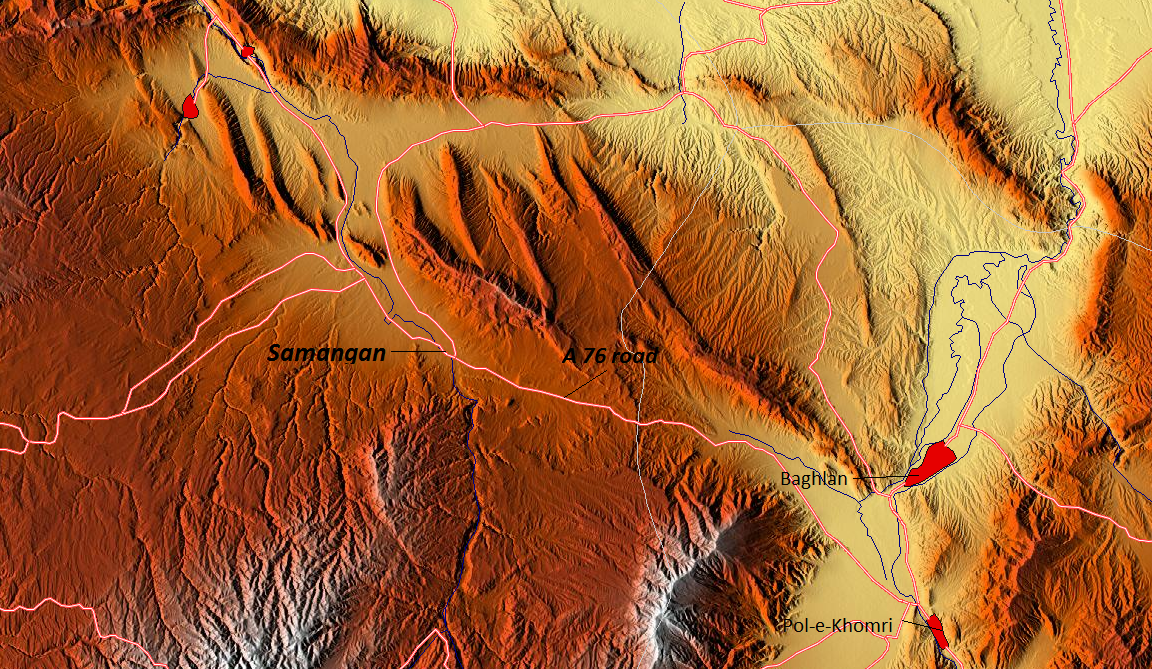
- Location of Aybak. Click to see.

- Location in Afghanistan
- Coordinates: 36°15′55″N 68°1′0″E
- Country: Afghanistan
- Province: Samangan
- District: Aybak

Government
  - Type: Municipality

Area
  - Land: 32 km^{2} (12 sq mi)
- Elevation: 959 m (3,146 ft)

Population (2025)
  - Provincial capital: 130,409
  - Urban: 38,174
  - Rural: 92,235
- Time zone: UTC+04:30 (Afghanistan Time)

Aybak or Aibak (Pashto, (Note: Pashto pronunciation: [ʔaj.bak]) Dari: (Note: Dari pronunciation: [ʔäj.bǽk]) ایبک), known in ancient times as Eukratidia (Ancient Greek: Εὐκρατιδία), is a city in northern Afghanistan, serving as the capital of Samangan Province. It is within the jurisdiction of Aybak District and has an estimated population of 130,409 people.

As an ancient town and major Buddhist center during the 4th and 5th centuries under the then Kushan rulers, it has the ruins of that period at a place known now as Takht-e Rostam, which is located on a hill above the town.

Due to its location, Aibak has been influenced by Persian, Buddhist, Islamic and Turkic peoples. In the past, it was significant because of its position on the main line of communication between Kabul and Afghan Turkestan.

== Geography ==
Aibak is located on the banks of the Khulm River valley formed below the junction of Hindu Kush Mountains and the Central Asian Steppe. The valley has very fertile agricultural land and is characterized by rolling green fields and hills at the sides.

The A76 highway from Kabul-Mazar-i-Sharif to Kunduz passes through Aibak. The nearest major cities are Baghlan and Mazar-i-Sharif.

Aibak sits at an altitude of 959 m (3,146 ft) above sea level, and has a land area of 32 km^{2} (12 sq mi).

=== Climate ===
Aybak features a four-season mediterranean climate (Köppen: Csa/Dsa). The annual mean temperature is 13.4 °C (56.1 °F).

Climate data for Aybak
Month	Jan	Feb	Mar	Apr	May	Jun	Jul	Aug	Sep	Oct	Nov	Dec	Year
Mean daily maximum °C (°F)	4.4 (39.9)	6.4 (43.5)	12.3 (54.1)	19.3 (66.7)	25.1 (77.2)	31.3 (88.3)	33.6 (92.5)	32.3 (90.1)	27.9 (82.2)	21.4 (70.5)	13.6 (56.5)	7.6 (45.7)	19.6 (67.3)
Daily mean °C (°F)	−0.4 (31.3)	1.6 (34.9)	7.2 (45.0)	13.7 (56.7)	18.6 (65.5)	24.1 (75.4)	26.5 (79.7)	25.1 (77.2)	20.3 (68.5)	14.3 (57.7)	7.5 (45.5)	2.6 (36.7)	13.4 (56.2)
Mean daily minimum °C (°F)	−5.2 (22.6)	−3.2 (26.2)	2.2 (36.0)	8.1 (46.6)	12.1 (53.8)	17.0 (62.6)	19.5 (67.1)	17.9 (64.2)	12.8 (55.0)	7.2 (45.0)	1.4 (34.5)	−2.4 (27.7)	7.3 (45.1)
Average precipitation mm (inches)	47 (1.9)	58 (2.3)	79 (3.1)	67 (2.6)	35 (1.4)	1 (0.0)	0 (0)	0 (0)	1 (0.0)	9 (0.4)	22 (0.9)	33 (1.3)	352 (13.9)
Source: Climate-Data.org

== History ==
The earliest known history is linked to the identification of the place by Ptolemy as the place of the Varni or Uarni and the fortified city of Samangan on the banks of the Khulm River, identical to the city on the Dargydus River, south east of Zariaspa/Balkh. The ruins found here establish the city's founding by Eucratides I, the King of Bactria. It was then known as Eukratidia, the size of the present city of Kholm.

Historicity of the town is dated to the time of the Kushan Empire, during the 4th and 5th centuries when it was a famous Buddhist center. Witness to this period is seen now in the form of ruins at a place called the Takht-e Rostam, which is located at the southwestern end of Aibak. Arabs and Mongols came to this place when it was already famous as a Buddhist religious center.

Takht-e Rostam is a historical place where ruins of Buddhist religious culture could be seen. The Buddhist stupa here in the form of a mound, located on the hilltop, represents the earliest link to the evolution of Buddhist architecture.

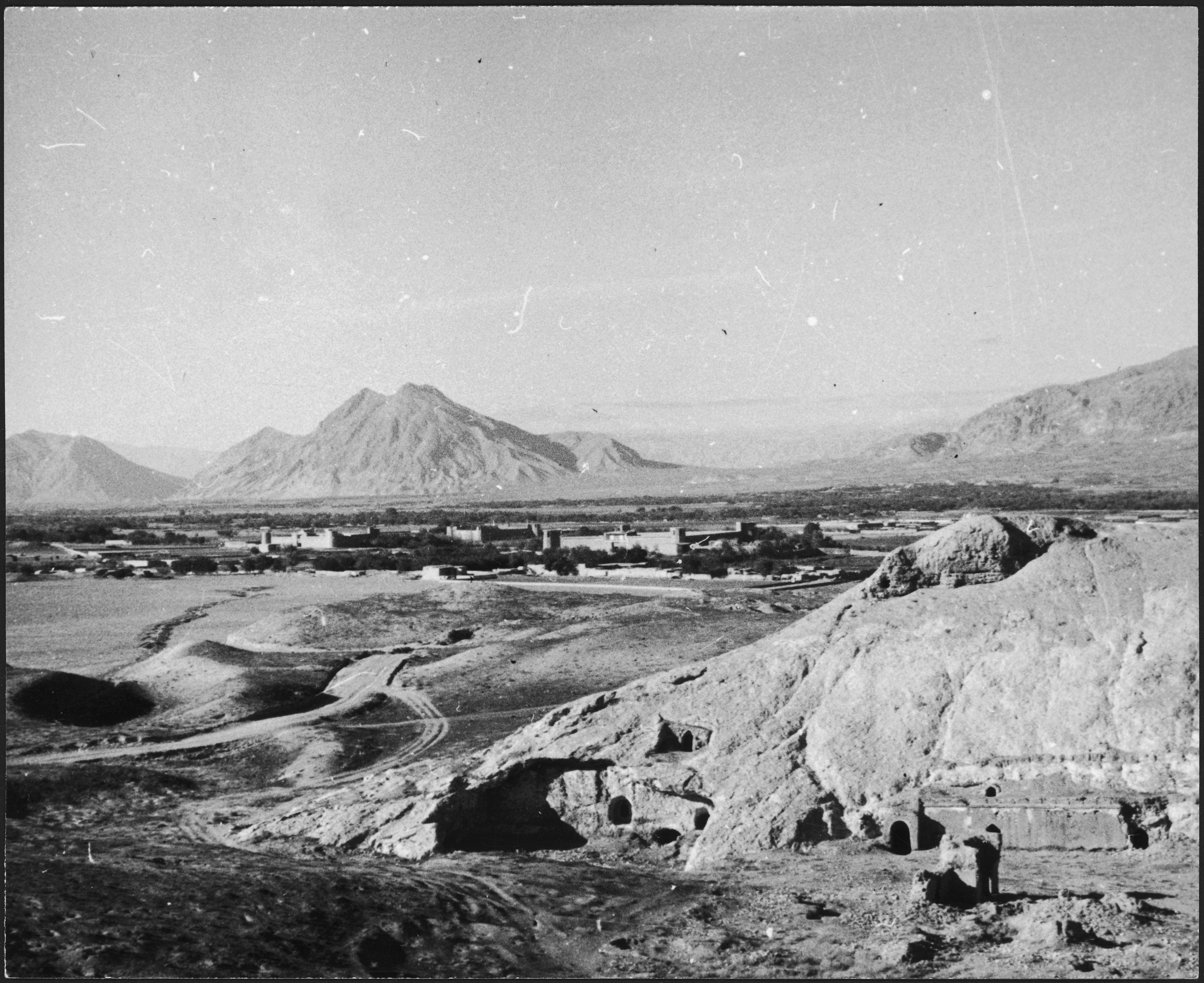
Aibak in 1939

Aibak was the name given to this place when during the medieval period, caravans used to stop here.

Following the United States invasion of Afghanistan in October 2001, the area began to be contested between the military forces of Abdul Rashid Dostum and that of Atta Muhammad Nur.

On October 23, 2003, during the war, rebels fired rockets at a pickup truck ferrying passengers to Aibak, which killed ten people.

In 2021, the Taliban launched a nationwide military offensive coinciding with the withdrawal of United States troops. Aybak was captured on 9 August 2021, becoming the sixth provincial capital to fall to the Taliban after a weekend offensive.

The bombing of a school in December 2022 killed 17 people.

== Historical heritage ==
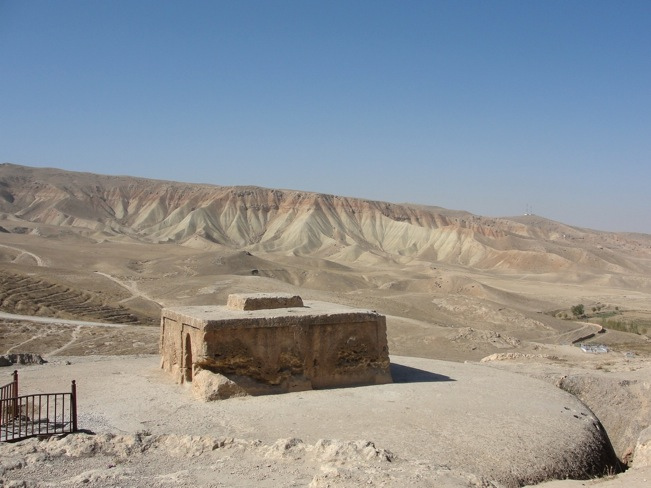
View from the top of Takht-e Rostam stupa and monastery next to the city

Samangan has one of the well-known archaeological sites in Afghanistan, in the Takht-e Rostam and the adjacent Buddhist caves and stupas on top of a hill, north of Hindu Kush passes. At this location, caves were hewn out of rocks and inhabited by Buddhists. The Buddhist stupa here is in the form of a mound. It represents the earliest link to the evolution of Buddhist architecture in Afghanistan. Another heritage site is the Hazar Sumuch District which is about 10 km (6.2 mi) away from the city.

Takht-e Rostam

Takht-e Rostam, literal meaning "the throne of Rostam", named after Rostam, a mythological warrior in Persian mythology, is a hilltop settlement. It is dated to the 4th and 5th centuries of the Kushano-Sassanian period, which is corroborated by archaeological, architectural and numismatic evidence. It is located at the southwestern end of Aibak. It is the location of a stupa-monastery complex which is fully carved into the mountain rock. The monastery of the major Buddhist tradition of Theravada Buddhism, has five chambers, two are sanctuaries and one is a domed ceiling with an intricate lotus leaf beautification. In the adjacent hill is the stupa, which has a harmika, with several caves at its base. Above one of the caves, there is square building with two conference halls, one is 22 metres square and the other is circular. In one of these caves, Archaeological excavations have revealed a cache of Ghaznavid coins. The Buddhist temples near the Takht are 10 numbers known locally as Kie Tehe.

Hazar Sumuch District

Hazar Sumuch District is another ancient Buddhist centre in north central Afghanistan where several caves have been found and in one of these caves a Buddhist stupa has been carved.

=== Legend ===
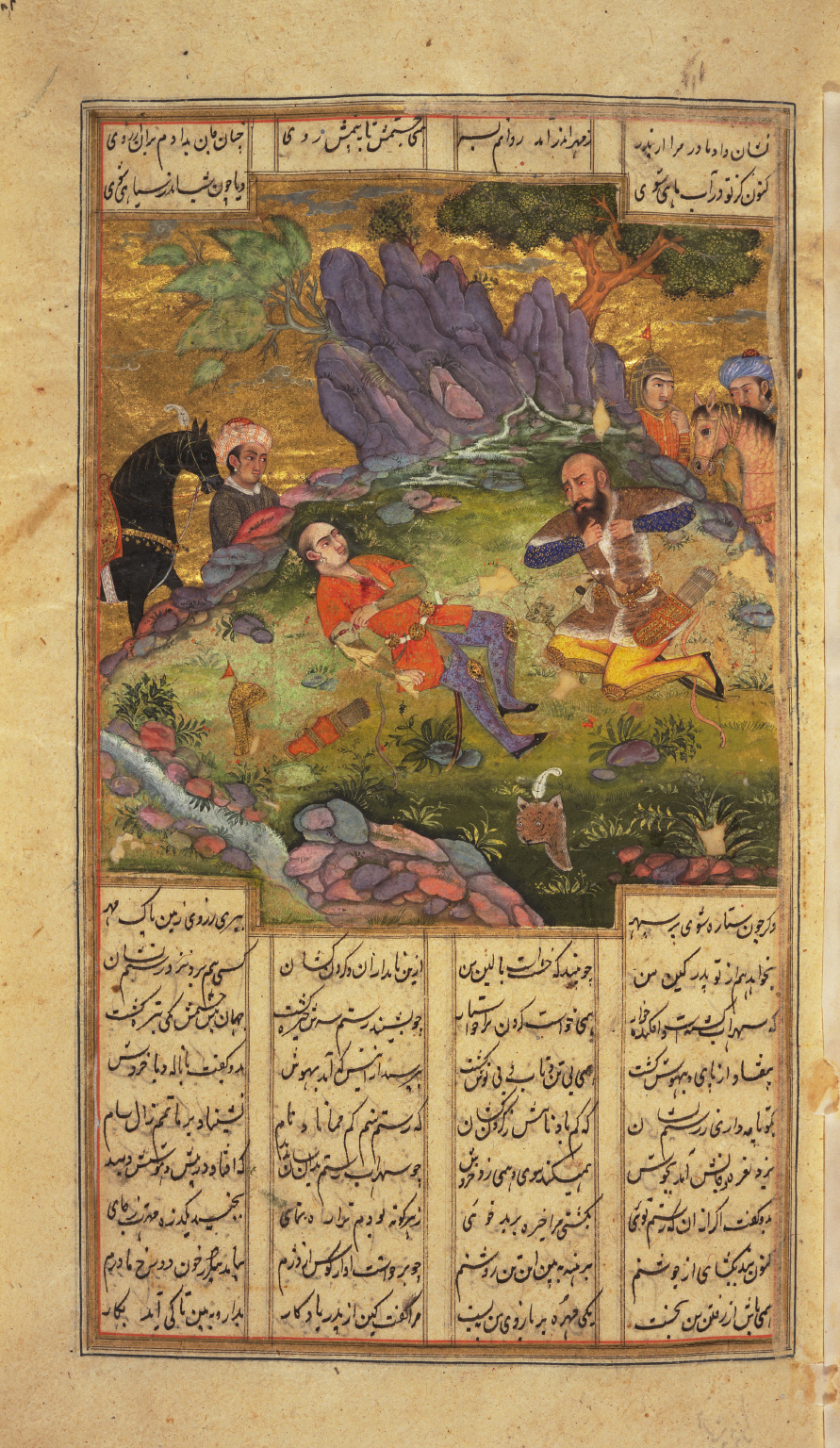
Rostam mourns for his son Sohrab whom he has killed in the battlefield

A hoary legend links Samangan to the famous epic story of Rostam and Sohrab. Rostam (meaning hero of the World), a valiant hero of Iran, was on a hunting visit to the Samangan area. He took rest at a place near the Samangan area, in the village of Shaihabad. During this time, his horse was stolen under a plan engineered by a local king, who was impressed by the valour of Rostam. The local king wanted to have Rostam as his ally. When Rostam finds out that his horse, named Rakhsh, had been stolen, he became furious and went in search of the horse and the search led him to the Samangan town. When he reached the outskirts of the town, the King of Samangan and his entourage came to greet him. Rostam then threatened the Samangan King with dire consequences if his horse was not found, as the horse's hoofprints had been tracked up to the village. The local king, however, assuaged Rostam and invited him to his palace as his honoured guest and entertained him lavishly. He also promised Rostam that he would arrange to send search parties to find his horse. While in the palace, the King's daughter Tamina met him and fell in love with Rostam. He also fell in love with her. With the approval of the King and the people of Samangan, the local ruler's beautiful daughter Tamina married Rostam. The king was pleased with this development and he then arranged to find the horse of Rostam. Rostam then returned to Iran, his home country. Before taking leave of his wife he gave her an onyx t that was tied to his arm. He gave it to her, and said:

Cherish this jewel, and if Heaven cause thee to give birth unto a daughter, fasten it within her locks, and it will shield her from evil; but if it be granted unto thee to bring forth a son, fasten it upon his arm, that he may wear it like his father. And he shall be strong as Keriman, of stature like unto Sam the son of Neriman, and of grace of speech like unto Zal, my father.

Both were sorrowful at the separation from each other. Their son was later born to Tamina in Samangan, who was named as Sohrab.

Tamina brought up her son with great dedication and taught him all the skills of warfare and he became very strong. She also told him about his father Rostam and his forefathers and their valiant achievements as warriors in Iran. She also gave him the gifts that his father had sent him. She advised him to be wary of Afrasiyab of Turan who was the father's foe. After knowing his ancestry and about his brave father, Sohrab decided to invade Iran. He also promised his mother that she would be the Queen of Iran. As he rode on a horse which was the foal of Rakshak, his father's horse, he thought the tidings were good. However, as he moved to wage war against Iran he encountered his father on the battlefield. His father had been kept totally unaware of his son's identity by Afrasiyab who wanted the father and son to fight each other. Before Sohrab led his army against Iran, Afrasiyab had beguiled him to join him in the war, with gifts with messages praising Sohrab for his intent to invade Iran and told him how that "if Iran be subdued the world would henceforth know peace, for upon his own head would he place the crown of the Kaianides; and Turan, Iran, and Samengan should be as one land." There was deceit and false information given about Rostam. Both were unaware of each other's identity and relationship when they faced each other on the battlefield. In the fierce battle that took place between the father and son Sohrab was mortally wounded. When Sohrab was wounded he announced his identity to Rostam and on hearing this Rostam was overtaken by intense grief and threw away his sword. Sohrab also was grief-stricken upon knowing that it was his father whom he had faced in the war and who had wounded him mortally. He then showed his onyx symbol that was tied to his armour. Rostam realized that it was the onyx which he had given to his wife and that he had really slain his own son. Kaykavous, the King of Iran, delayed giving Rostam the healing potion (Noush Daru) to save Sohrab as he feared losing his power to the alliance of the father and son.

== Economy ==
The economy of Aibak is based on agriculture, trade, and transport. Some residents of the city go to work in Kabul and other Afghan cities.

== Health and healthcare ==
The city has a number of hospitals and clinics.

== In popular culture ==
The Northumbrian modernist poet Basil Bunting wrote a poem about the town. "Let them remember Samangan..." stands 32nd in the first book of Odes in his Collected Poems. The poem is dated 1937, hence Bunting cannot have actually visited the town; although he did later travel in the Middle East, whether he ever went to Afghanistan is unknown but unlikely. However, in the same year his first son was born in Wisconsin, United States, and named Rostam; evidently the legend of Rostam and Sohrab inspired the poem as well as the child's name. The poem itself is an unrhymed sonnet, less experimental than many of Bunting's short poems from the period, but successful in its own elegiac manner.
