= Hazrat-e Soltan =

Hazrat-e Soltan حضرت سلطان
- Village
- Location within Iran
- Coordinates: 37°31′00″N 58°56′03″E
- Country: Iran
- Province: Razavi Khorasan
- County: Dargaz
- Bakhsh: Now Khandan
- Rural District: Shahrestaneh

Population (2006)
  - Total: 96
- Time zone: UTC+3:30 (IRST)
  - Summer (DST): UTC+4:30 (IRDT)

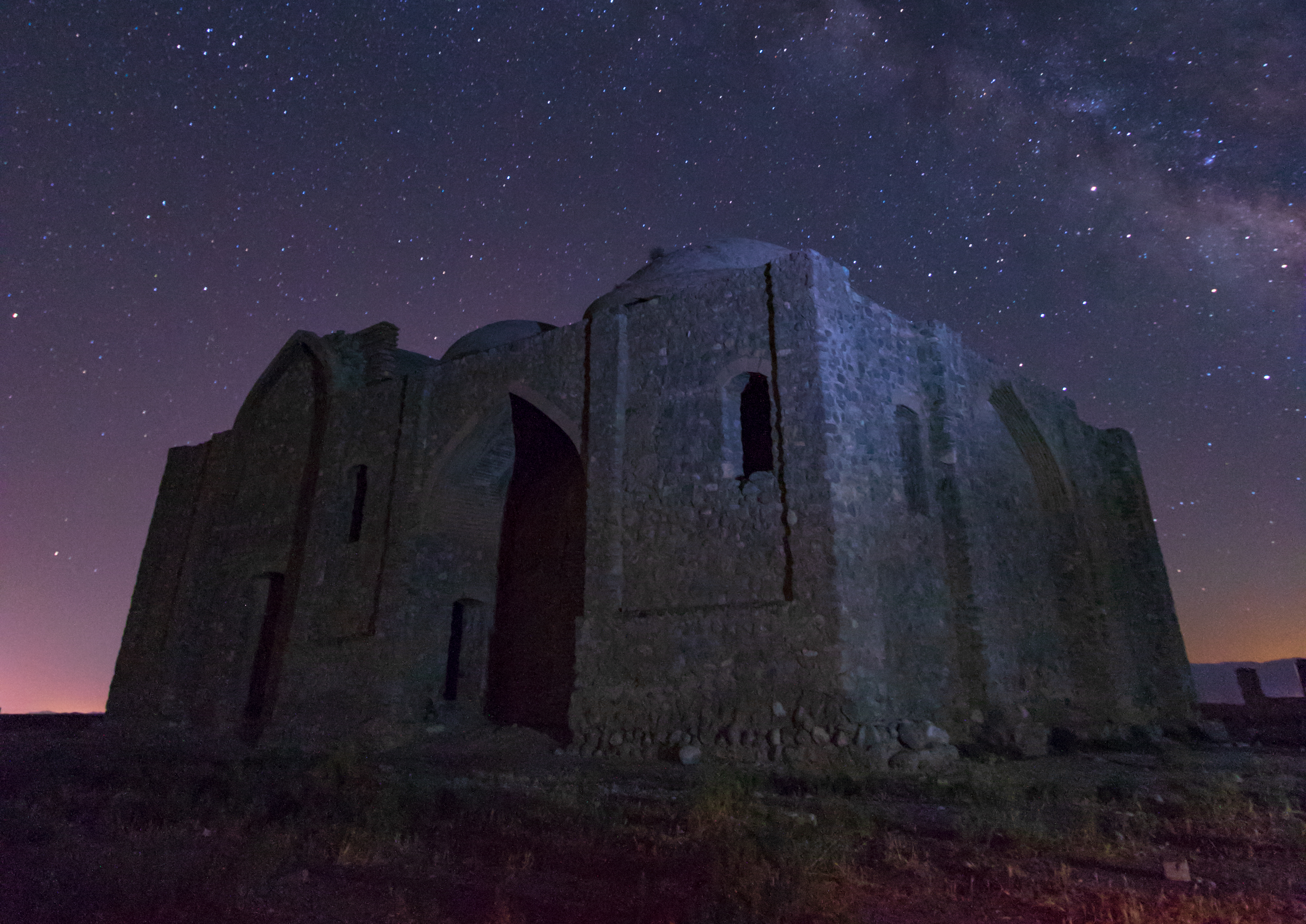

Hazrat-e Soltan (Persian: حضرت سلطان, also Romanized as Ḩaẕrat-e Solţān, Ḩaẕrat-esolţān, and Ḩaẕrat Solţān) is a village in Shahrestaneh Rural District, Now Khandan District, Dargaz County, Razavi Khorasan Province, Iran. At the 2006 census, its population was 96, in 27 families.
