= Kishindih District =

Kishindih کشنده
- District
- Location within Afghanistan
- Coordinates: 36°00′36″N 66°55′12″E
- Country: Afghanistan
- Province: Balkh
- Capital: Kishindinh Bala
- Elevation: 750 m (2,460 ft)

Population (2012)
  - Total: 47,300

Kishindih or Kishindeh (Dari: کشنده) is the southernmost district in Balkh province. Its capital is Kishindinh Bala, situated in the northern part of the district.
