= Aybak District =

Aybak ایبک
- District
- Location in Afghanistan
- Coordinates: 36.1560°N 68.0478°E
- Country: Afghanistan
- Province: Samangan Province
- Time zone: + 4.30

Aybak District is a district in Samangan Province, Afghanistan. It contains the town of Aybak which serves as the provincial capital of Samangan. The population in 2019 was estimated to be 116,281.
