= AH76 =

Road in Asia

Asian Highway 76 (AH76) is a major road of northern Afghanistan. It connects Pole khomri at AH7 to Mazar-i-Sharif, passing through Samangan on the way, and then passes west and eventually ends at Herat, where it unites with AH1 and AH77 At Mazar-e-Sharif the road continues and joins the A01 and AH77 highways. Another road passes north from the A76 and connects it to Termiz in southern Uzbekistan. Note though that this "other road" is often regarded as a continuation of the A76, although it is actually part of the historical Pamir Highway, now known as the M41 highway (AH62). This road links Mazar-i-Sharif across the Amu Darya river, to Termiz. The Pamir Highway or the M41 is an extremely important highway of Uzbekistan, Tajikistan and Kyrgyzstan, which connects Termiz to Kara Balta to the west of Bishkek and links with the M39 highway twice at both cities.

The AH76 begins in Pole khomri at 35°58′30″N 68°58′30″E from Asian Highway 1. The route is the following:

== Afghanistan ==
- NH0104 Ring Highway: Pole khomri - Mazar-i Sharif
- NH0103 Ring Highway: Mazar-i Sharif - Harat
