= Provinces of Afghanistan =

First-level administrative territorial entity of Afghanistan

- Also known as: Wilayat
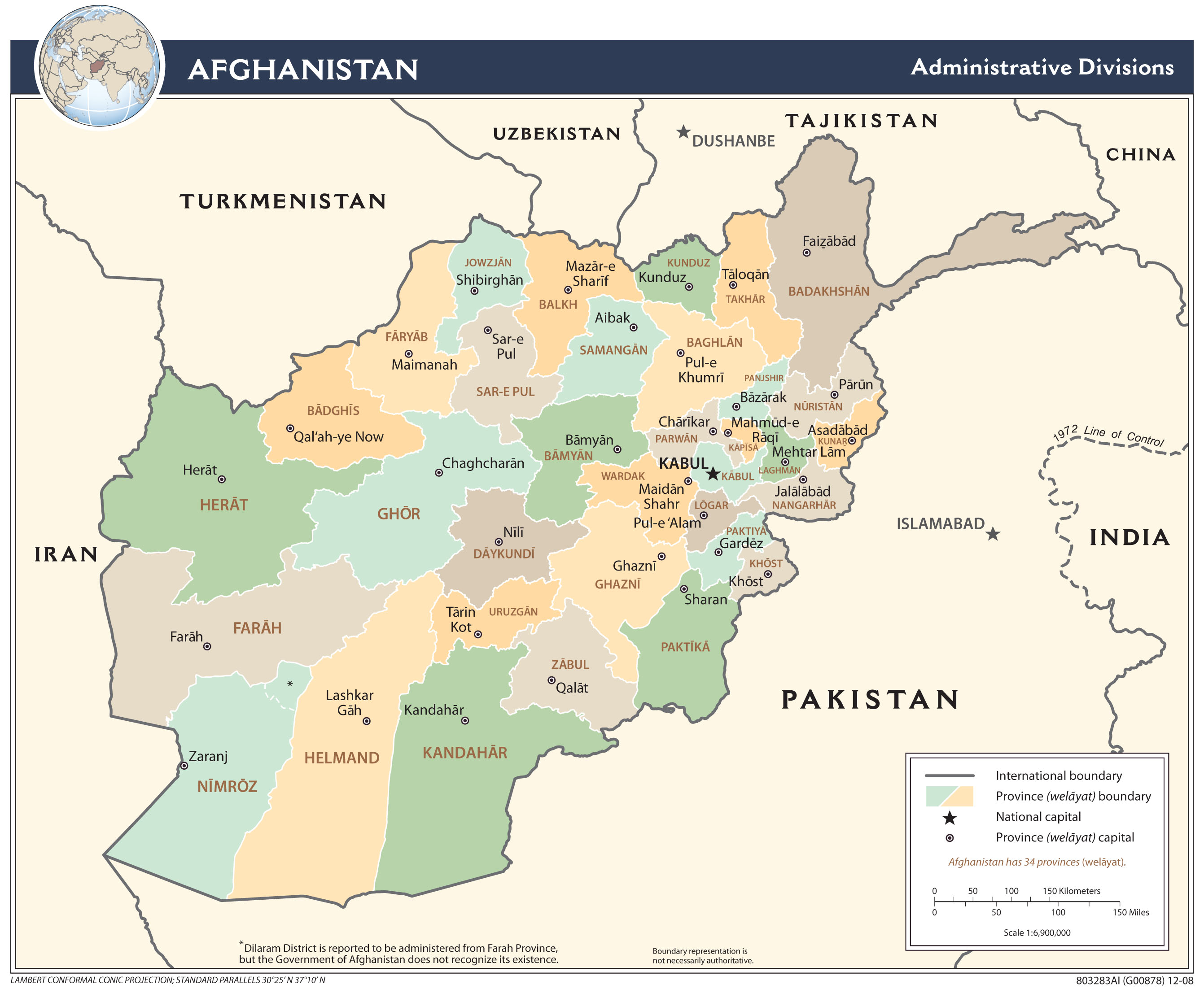
- Category: Unitary state
- Location: Afghanistan
- Number: 34 provinces
- Populations: 167,425 (Nuristan) – 5,211,452 (Kabul)
- Areas: 737 sq mi (1,908 km^{2}) (Kapisa) – 22,512 sq mi (58,305 km^{2}) (Helmand)
- Government: Provincial governments
- Subdivisions: District

The provinces of Afghanistan (Pashto and Dari: ولايت wilāyat) are the primary administrative divisions of the Islamic Emirate of Afghanistan. There are 34 provinces in Afghanistan. Each province encompasses a number of districts or usually over 1,000 villages.

Provincial governors played a critical role in the reconstruction of the Afghan state following the creation of the new government under Hamid Karzai. According to international security scholar Dipali Mukhopadhyay, many of the provincial governors of the western-backed government were former warlords who were incorporated into the political system.

== History of administrative divisions of Afghanistan ==
The administrative divisions of Afghanistan have evolved through a gradual process of centralisation, shaped by geography, military power, and the state's efforts to extend authority from Kabul to peripheral regions. Until the 20th century, governance relied largely on personal rule, tribal alliances, and tribute rather than clearly defined territorial units.

=== Early modern period ===
Before the establishment of modern state institutions, the territory of present-day Afghanistan was not divided into fixed provinces. Under the Durrani Empire (1747–1823), administration functioned through a loose confederation of tribal leaders and appointed relatives. Core centres of authority included Kandahar, Kabul, Herat, and western regions such as Sistan. Control was exercised through military levies, revenue extraction, and personal loyalty, while boundaries remained fluid and weakly institutionalised.

Map of Afghanistan 1839–1863, showing the First Anglo-Afghan war, and unification of Afghanistan by Dost Mohammad Khan

Following the death of Ahmad Shah Durrani in 1772, internal dynastic conflicts led to fragmentation. By the early 19th century, power was divided among principalities centred on Kabul, Kandahar, and Herat, alongside semi-autonomous northern khanates in Balkh, Kunduz, and Badakhshan. Local chieftains exercised de facto authority in rural areas, often limiting the reach of central rule. A renewed process of unification occurred under Dost Mohammad Khan from 1826, who gradually brought Ghazni, Hazarajat, northern Turkestan, Kandahar, and Herat under central control by 1863. Administration remained personal and dynastic, with key regions governed by family members and local rulers integrated through tribute rather than direct bureaucracy.

=== Centralization efforts during the 19th and early 20th centuries ===
During the 19th century, Afghan rulers increasingly sought to formalise territorial administration. Provinces were defined broadly along major river systems and watersheds, such as the Kabul River, Helmand River, Hari Rud, and the Oxus basin. By around 1880 and the ascent of Emir Abdur Rahman Khan, British historian W. P. Andrew identified the main provinces as Cabul, Jellalabad, Ghuzni, Candahar, Herat, and Balkh (also called Afghan Turkestan), although these units were not systematically surveyed and are known mainly from written sources. In addition, he identified the rugged regions inhabited by the Ghilzai and Hazara, roughly corresponding with the lands between Kandahar and Paktia and Hazarajat respectively.

In 1890, Afghanistan was first mentioned in the Statesman's Yearbook as a separate entity, stating that the dominions of the Emirate of Afghanistan are divided into the four provinces of Kabul, Turkistan, Herat, and Kandahar, as well as the districts of Badakhshan and Wakhan, at the time being seen as separate provinces. Since 1892, Wakhan was included into the district of Badakhshan as part of its dependencies. Between 1891 and 1893, a thorough description of the administrative divisions of Afghanistan was compiled by British military officers, drawing on reports, surveys, and Afghan Boundary Commission records. The works cover the six provinces of Badakhshan, Afghan Turkistan, Herat, Kabul, Kandahar, and Farah, with the latter being formed out of parts of Herat and Kandahar as well as the de facto independent Sistan and Garmsir regions during the time of Sher Ali Khan. An overview over all provinces and their districts and subdistricts is provided below:

Provinces and Districts of Afghanistan in 1893
Province

Badakhshan		
Districts	Subdistricts	Source
Kataghan/Kunduz	–	
Andarab	–	
Khinjan	–	
Doshi	–	
Ghori	–	
Baghlan	–	
Narin	–	
Khost	–	
Farkhar	–	
Rustak	–	
Shiva	–	
Ragh	–	
Zebak	–	
Ishkasham	–	
Gharan	–	
Faisabad	–	
Shighnan	–	
Roshan	–	
Wakhan	–	

Afghan Turkistan		
Districts	Subdistricts	Source
Mazar-i-Sharif	Mazar-i-Sharif	
Mazar-i-Sharif	Shor Tepa	
Mazar-i-Sharif	Chaharkind	
Mazar-i-Sharif	Buinnkara	
Mazar-i-Sharif	Kishindi	
Mazar-i-Sharif	Ak Kupruk	
Mazar-i-Sharif	Tunj	
Balkh	–	
Akcha	Akcha	
Akcha	Khwaja Salar	
Akcha	Daolatabad	
Shibarghan	–	
Andkhoi	–	
Tashqurghan	Pir Nakhchir	
Tashqurghan	Ghaznigak	
Tashqurghan	Kaldar	
Haibak	–	
Dara Yusuf	–	
Doab and Rui	–	
Saighan and Kamard	–	
Balkhab	–	
Sang Charak	–	
Sar-i-Pul	–	
Maimana	–	

Herat		
Districts	Subdistricts	Source
Herat	–	
Ghorian	–	
Karokh	–	
Obeh	–	
Sabzwar	–	
Shahfilan	–	
Badghis	–	
Murghab	–	
Taimani	–	
Firozkohi	–	

Kabul		
Districts	Subdistricts	Source
Kabul	Kabul	
Kabul	Chardeh	
Kabul	Paghman	
Kabul	Butkhak	
Kabul	Chaharasia	
Kabul	Chahil Dukhteran	
Jalalabad	–	
Laghman	–	
Kunar	–	
Khost	–	
Zurmat	–	
Katawaz	–	
Mukur	–	
Ghazni	–	
Logar	Logar	
Logar	Surkhao	
Logar	Kushi	
Logar	Cherkh	
Maidan	–	
Koh Daman	–	
Kohistan	Tagao	
Kohistan	Nijrao	
Kohistan	Panjshir	
Kohistan	Charikar	
Ghorband (Note: Ghorband has also been considered part of Kohistan.)	–	
Bamian	Bamian	
Bamian	Yak Walang	
Bamian	Dai Zangi (Note: Dai Zangi has also been considered part of Hazarajat.)	
Besud (Note: Besud has also been considered part of Hazarajat.)	–	
Hazarajat	Dai Kundi	
Hazarajat	Ghazni Hazara	
Hazarajat	independent Hazaras (Note: At the time of writing, it was being brought under the control of Emir Abdul Rahman Khan during the third Hazara uprising of 1893.)	

Farah		
Districts	Subdistricts	Source
Farah	–	
Lash-Juwain/Hokat	–	
Sistan/Chakhansur	–	
Shahiwan	–	
Gulistan	–	
Bakwa	–	
Pusht-i-Rud	Pusht-i-Rud/Girishk	
Pusht-i-Rud	Garmsel	
Pusht-i-Rud	Naozad	
Pusht-i-Rud	Zamindawar	

Kandahar		
Districts	Subdistricts	Source
Kandahar	Kariajat	
Kandahar	Mohalajat	
Kandahar	Daman/Karezat	
Tirin	–	
Derawat	–	
Dahla	15 subdivisions	
Deh-i-Buchi	–	
Khakrez	–	
Kushk-i-Nakhud	–	
Maiwand	–	
Nish	–	
Ghorak	–	
Kalat-i-Ghilzai	Omaki	
Kalat-i-Ghilzai	Nawa-i-Ghundan	
Kalat-i-Ghilzai	Ulan-Rabat and Shahjui	
Kalat-i-Ghilzai	Khakah and Tasi	
Kalat-i-Ghilzai	Nawa-i-Arghandab	
Arghistan	–	
Tarnak	–	
Mizan	Takir	
Mizan	Makrah	
Mizan	Takhum	
Mizan	Alam Gul Khar	
Mizan	Siajui	
Mizan	Selim	
Mizan	Yakir	
Mizan	Arghasu	
Mizan	Shekan	
Maruf	–	
Kadanai	–	
Shorawak	–	

In 1896, Afghanistan took control over Kafiristan, including it into the province of Kabul. In 1905, the province of Badakhshan was merged into Afghan Turkistan.

=== Provincial reform under Amanullah Khan in the 1920s ===
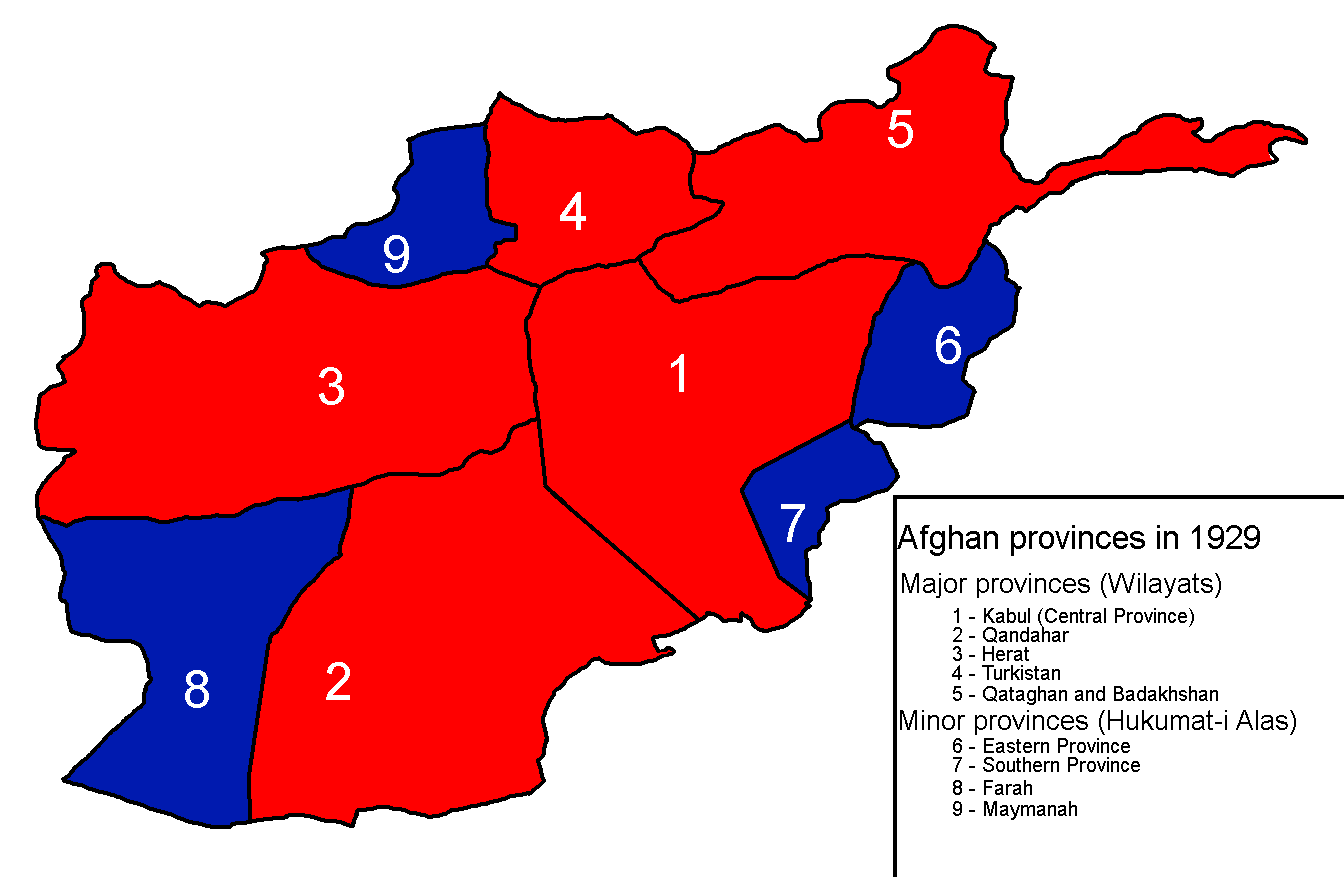
Historical provinces of Afghanistan since 1921

After Afghanistan became fully independent from the British in 1919, a major reform of sub-national administration was introduced under King Amanullah Khan through the regulation on the territorial divisions of Afghanistan (Dari: نظامنامه تقسیمات ملکیه افغانستان, romanized: niẓāmnāmah-i taqsīmāt-i mulkīyah-i Afghānistān) in 1300 Hijri (1921/22 Gregorian). Drawing on naturally occurring geographic boundaries, existing local identities, and accessibility from the centre, the regulation formalised a five-tier hierarchy of sub-national units:

1. provinces (Dari: ولایت, romanized: wilāyat) or high governorates (Dari: حکومت اعلی, romanized: ḥukūmat-i ʿālā)
2. large governorates (Dari: حکومت کلان, romanized: ḥukūmat-i kalān)
3. governorates (Dari: حکومت, romanized: ḥukūmat)
4. sub-districts (Dari: علاقه, romanized: ʿalāqa)
5. villages (Dari: قریه, romanized: qarya)

The system was administratively complex. At the apex of the sub-national structure stood two functionally equivalent unit types. The provinces, headed by a deputy or viceroy of the government (Dari: نائب الحکومه, romanized: nāʾib ul-ḥukūma), and the high governorates, headed by a high governor (Dari: حاکم اعلی, romanized: ḥākim-i ʿālā), both reported directly to the central government. The regulation established five provinces and four high governorates:

- Province of Kabul (Dari: ولایت کابل, romanized: Wilāyat-i Kābul)
- Province of Kandahar (Dari: ولایت قندهار, romanized: Wilāyat-i Qandahār)
- Province of Herat (Dari: ولایت هرات, romanized: Wilāyat-i Herāt)
- Province of Turkistan (Dari: ولایت ترکستان, romanized: Wilāyat-i Turkistān)
- Province of Qataghan and Badakhshan (Dari: ولایت قطغن و بدخشان, romanized: Wilāyat-i Qaṭaghan wa Badakhshān)
- High Governorate of the East (Dari: حکومت اعلی سمت مشرقی, romanized: Ḥukūmat-i ʿĀlā-yi Samt-i Mashriqi)
- High Governorate of the South (Dari: حکومت اعلی سمت جنوبی, romanized: Ḥukūmat-i ʿĀlā-yi Samt-i Junūbi)
- High Governorate of Farah (Dari: حکومت اعلی فراه, romanized: Ḥukūmat-i ʿĀlā-yi Farāh)
- High Governorate of Maimana (Dari: حکومت اعلی میمنه, romanized: Ḥukūmat-i ʿĀlā-yi Maimana)

Below these, the large governorates, headed by a large governor (Dari: حاکم کلان, romanized: ḥākim-i kalān), formed the second tier and could encompass governorates, sub-districts and villages beneath it. The governorates, headed by a governor (Dari: حاکم, romanized: ḥākim), existed in three grades, whereas the sub-districts, headed by a sub-district chief (Dari: علاقه دار, romanized: ʿalāqadār), existed in two grades, reflecting differences in administrative importance. The villages, headed by a village chief (Dari: قریه دار, romanized: qaryādār), constituted the lowest unit. Units at any tier could be subordinated directly to any superior level without necessarily passing through all intermediate layers.

The regulation contained several internal ambiguities and inconsistencies, as it was sometimes unevenly applied. Within the province of Qataghan and Badakhshan, the two administrative units of Qataghan and Badakhshan are sometimes referred to as "large governorates" whereas sometimes they are simply called "governorates". A similar inconsistency appears in the provinces of Kabul and Kandahar, each of which contained a governorate of the same name that governed further governorates beneath it, placing it structurally on the level of a large governorate, though the regulation neither gives them this title nor (in the case of Kandahar) specifies who was responsible for leading them. A further exception concerned the province of Kabul as a whole since unlike all other units, the province and all its subordinate divisions at every level fell under the direct authority of the Ministry of the Interior rather than the standard provincial chain of command.

=== Mid-20th century reforms ===
Between the 1920s and 1960s, successive governments sought to simplify the administrative structure. Large historical provinces such as Turkestan, Qataghan-Badakhshan, Eastern, Southern, and Farah-Chakansur were gradually dissolved or subdivided. High governorates and governorates were transformed into provinces or districts, while sub-districts remained in use until the late 20th century.

The 1964 Constitution marked a turning point by introducing the principle of balanced regional development and consultative provincial councils. An administrative law enacted in 1965 established a clear hierarchy of provinces, districts, and villages and formally listed all recognised units. In 1963–1964, the country was reorganised into 28 provinces, replacing fewer, larger units with smaller provinces to improve governance and development planning. This framework remained largely in place until the end of the monarchy in 1973.

=== During war times in the 20th and 21st century ===
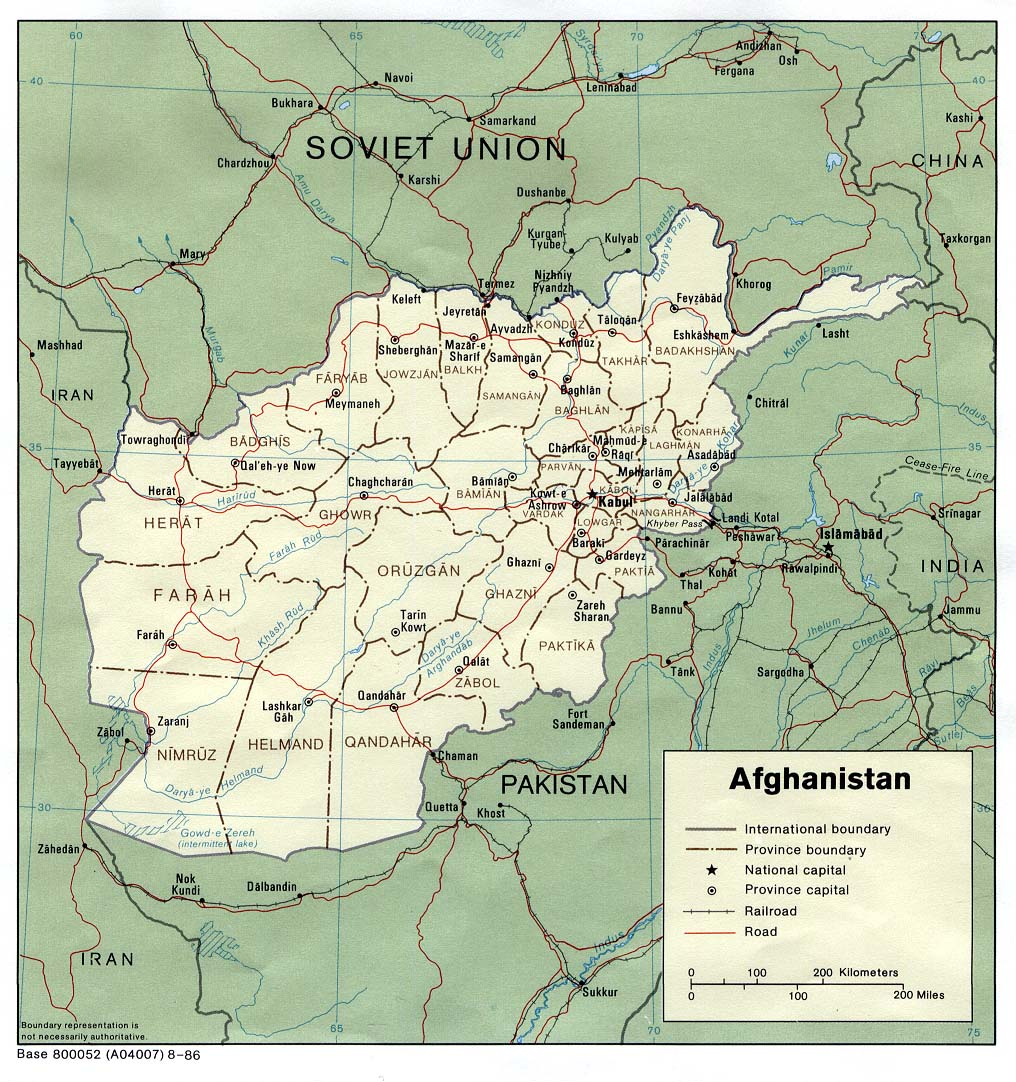
Administrative divisions of Afghanistan, c. 1986

From the late 1960s onward, local demands and administrative needs led to a gradual increase in the number of districts and provinces. Between the Soviet–Afghan War and the Afghan civil wars, 4 new provinces were created: Paktika, Khost, Sar-i Pul, and Nuristan. A law on local administration in 2000 abolished large districts and sub-districts, upgrading most sub-districts to full districts. After the fall of the first Taliban regime in 2001, the interim and subsequent governments retained the existing provincial structure, with governors appointed by the central authority.

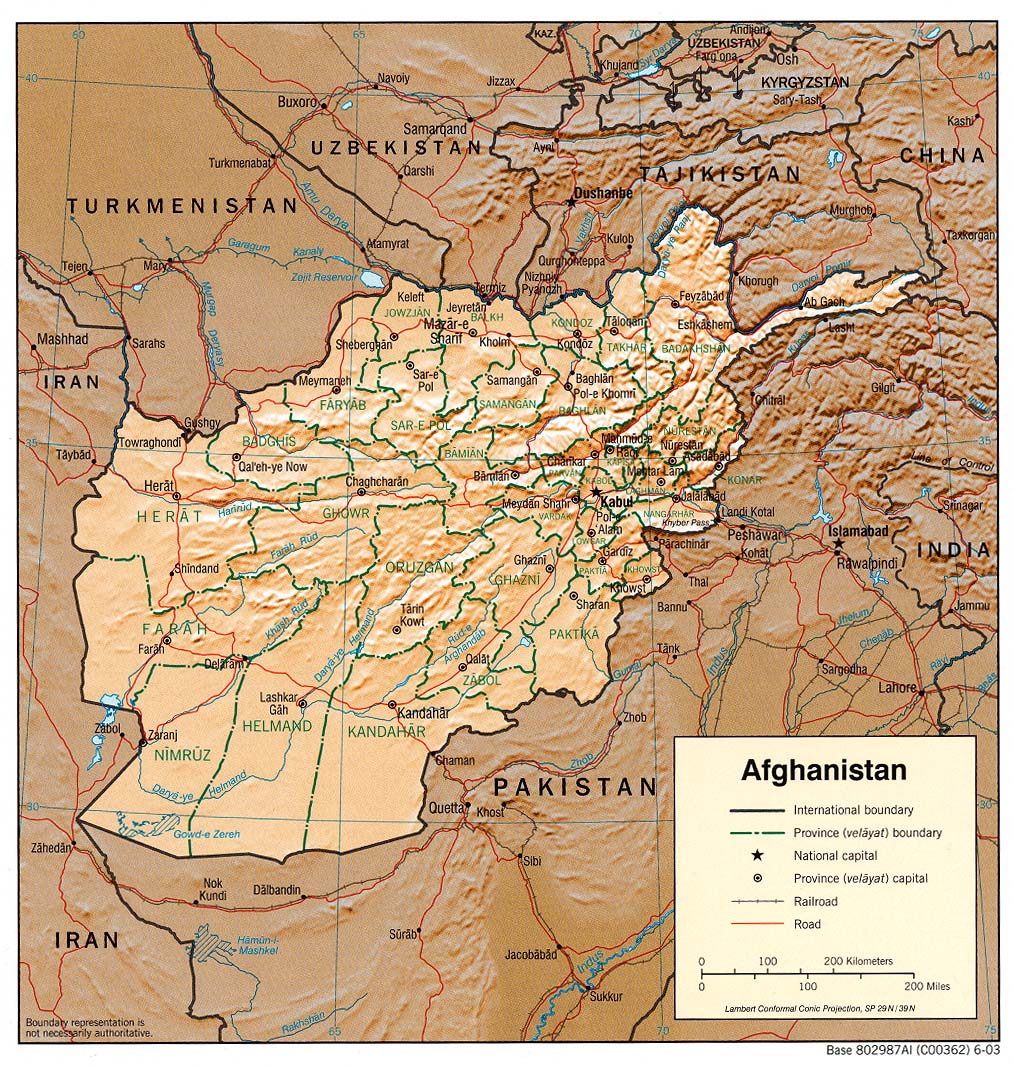
Provinces of Afghanistan, c. 2003

Two new provinces were created in 2004 following the adoption of the Constitution of Afghanistan. Daykundi was formed from districts of Uruzgan, and Panjshir was separated from Parwan. These changes increased the total number of provinces to 34. No further provincial boundary changes occurred during the remainder of the Islamic Republic period, although the number of districts continued to expand. By 2021, Afghanistan consisted of 34 provinces and 378 districts, reflecting long-term administrative expansion rather than major territorial reorganisation.

=== Since 2021 ===
Following the Taliban's return to power in August 2021, the 34-province framework was retained. Provincial governors and senior officials have been appointed directly by the central leadership, reinforcing a highly centralised system of administration. While formal provincial boundaries have remained unchanged, governance practices have shifted toward tighter political and ideological control, with provinces functioning primarily as instruments of security and enforcement under the Islamic Emirate.

== Provinces of Afghanistan ==
Provinces of Afghanistan

=== Administrative ===
The following table lists the province, capital, number of districts, UN region, region, ISO 3166-2:AF code and license plate code.

Afghan provinces and administrative data
Province	Capital	Districts	UN Region	Region	ISO	Plate code
Badakhshan	Fayzabad	29	North East	North	AF-BDS	BDN
Badghis	Qala i Naw	7	West	Central	AF-BDG	BDG
Baghlan	Puli Khumri	16	North East	North	AF-BGL	BAG
Balkh	Mazar-i-Sharif	15	North West	North	AF-BAL	BLH
Bamyan	Bamyan	7	West	Central	AF-BAM	BAM
Daykundi	Nili	8	South West	South	AF-DAY	DYK
Farah	Farah	11	West	Central	AF-FRA	FRH
Faryab	Maymana	14	North West	North	AF-FYB	FYB
Ghazni	Ghazni	19	South East	South	AF-GHA	GAZ
Ghor	Firozkoh	11	West	Central	AF-GHO	GHR
Helmand	Lashkargah	13	South West	South	AF-HEL	HEL
Herat	Herat	15	West	Central	AF-HER	HRT
Jowzjan	Sheberghan	9	North West	North	AF-JOW	JZJ
Kabul	Kabul	18	Central	Central	AF-KAB	KBL
Kandahar	Kandahar	16	South West	South	AF-KAN	KRD
Kapisa	Mahmud-i-Raqi	7	Central	Central	AF-KAP	KPS
Khost	Khost	13	South East	South	AF-KHO	KST
Kunar	Asadabad	15	East	Central	AF-KNR	KNR
Kunduz	Kunduz	7	North East	North	AF-KDZ	KDZ
Laghman	Mihtarlam	5	East	Central	AF-LAG	LGM
Logar	Pul-i-Alam	7	Central	Central	AF-LOG	LGR
Nangarhar	Jalalabad	23	East	Central	AF-NAN	NGR
Nimruz	Zaranj	5	South West	South	AF-NIM	NRZ
Nuristan	Parun	7	East	Central	AF-NUR	NUR
Paktia	Gardez	11	South East	South	AF-PIA	PAK
Paktika	Sharana	15	South East	South	AF-PKA	PKT
Panjshir	Bazarak	7	Central	Central	AF-PAN	PJR
Parwan	Charikar	9	Central	Central	AF-PAR	PRN
Samangan	Aybak	5	North West	North	AF-SAM	SAM
Sar-e Pol	Sar-e Pol	7	North West	North	AF-SAR	SRP
Takhar	Taloqan	16	North East	North	AF-TAK	TAK
Uruzgan	Tarinkot	6	South West	South	AF-URU	ORZ
Wardak	Maidan Shar	9	Central	Central	AF-WAR	WDK
Zabul	Qalat	9	South West	South	AF-ZAB	ZAB

=== Demographic ===
The following table lists the province, population in 2024, area in square kilometers and population density.

Afghan provinces and demographic data
Province	Population	Area km^{2}	Density /km^{2}
Badakhshan	1,130,535	44,836	25.2
Badghis	575,212	20,794	27.7
Baghlan	1,093,013	18,255	59.9
Balkh	1,560,365	16,186	96.4
Bamyan	531,344	18,029	29.5
Daykundi	553,372	17,501	31.6
Farah	604,420	49,339	12.3
Faryab	1,192,381	20,798	57.3
Ghazni	1,461,703	22,461	65.1
Ghor	833,304	36,657	22.7
Helmand	1,552,838	58,305	26.6
Herat	2,332,654	55,869	41.8
Jowzjan	648,804	11,293	57.5
Kabul	5,966,395	4,524	1,319.0
Kandahar	1,532,662	54,845	27.9
Kapisa	523,201	1,908	274.2
Khost	682,333	4,235	161.1
Kunar	535,488	4,926	108.7
Kunduz	1,233,223	8,081	152.6
Laghman	528,879	3,978	132.9
Logar	465,698	4,568	101.9
Nangarhar	1,840,831	7,641	240.9
Nimruz	197,513	42,410	4.7
Nuristan	175,507	9,267	18.9
Paktia	830,994	5,583	148.8
Paktika	656,430	19,516	33.6
Panjshir	182,054	3,772	48.3
Parwan	792,273	5,715	138.6
Samangan	552,763	13,438	41.1
Sar-e Pol	666,737	16,386	40.7
Takhar	1,175,306	12,459	94.3
Uruzgan	467,659	11,474	40.8
Wardak	707,486	10,348	68.4
Zabul	412,150	17,472	23.6

== Regions of Afghanistan ==
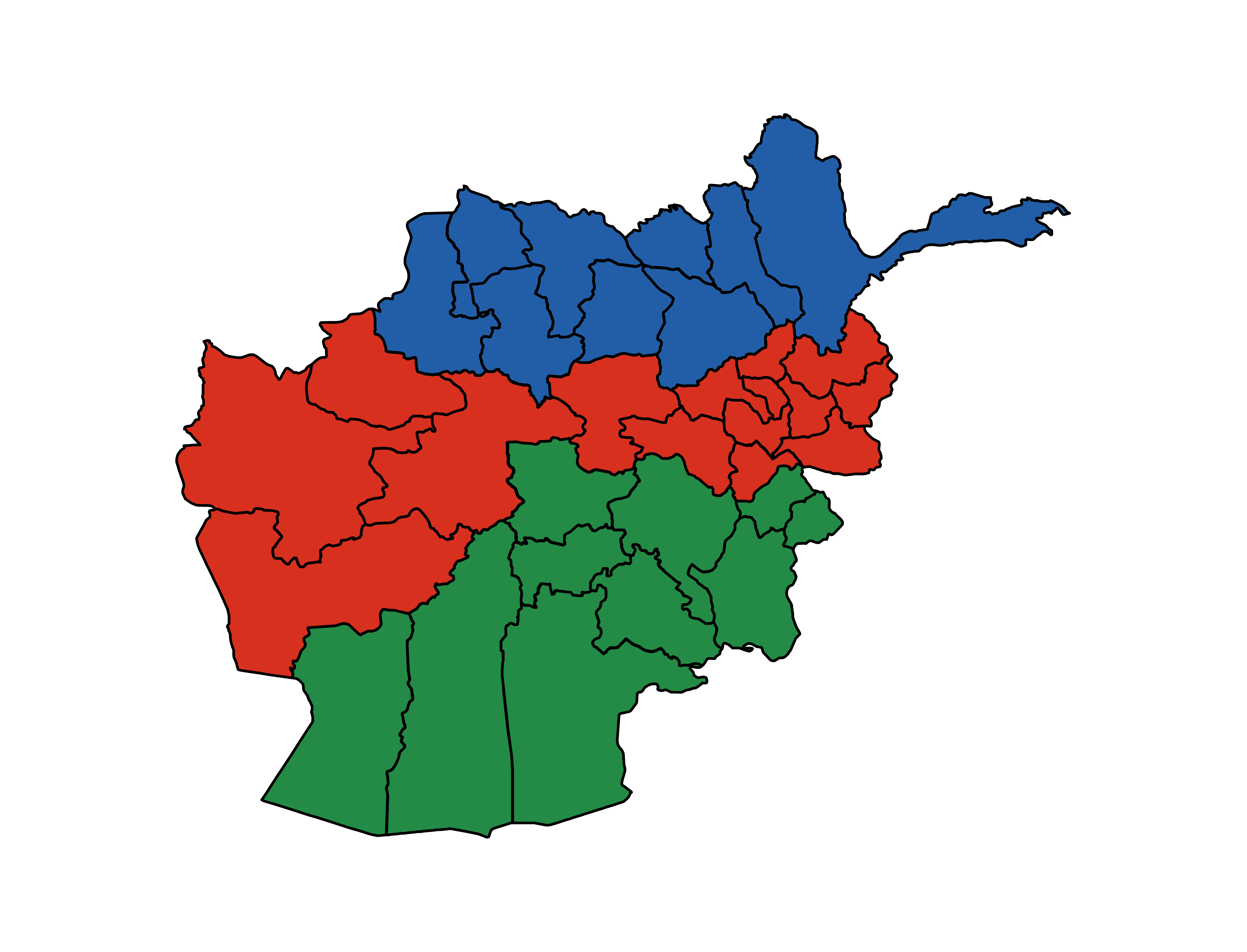
Blue : North Red: Central Green : South

The following tables summarize data from the demographic table.

Regions and demographic data
Region	Population	Area km^{2}	Density /km^{2}
Central	16,594,746	237,335	69.9
North	9,253,127	161,730	57.2
South	8,347,654	253,801	32.9

=== UN regions ===
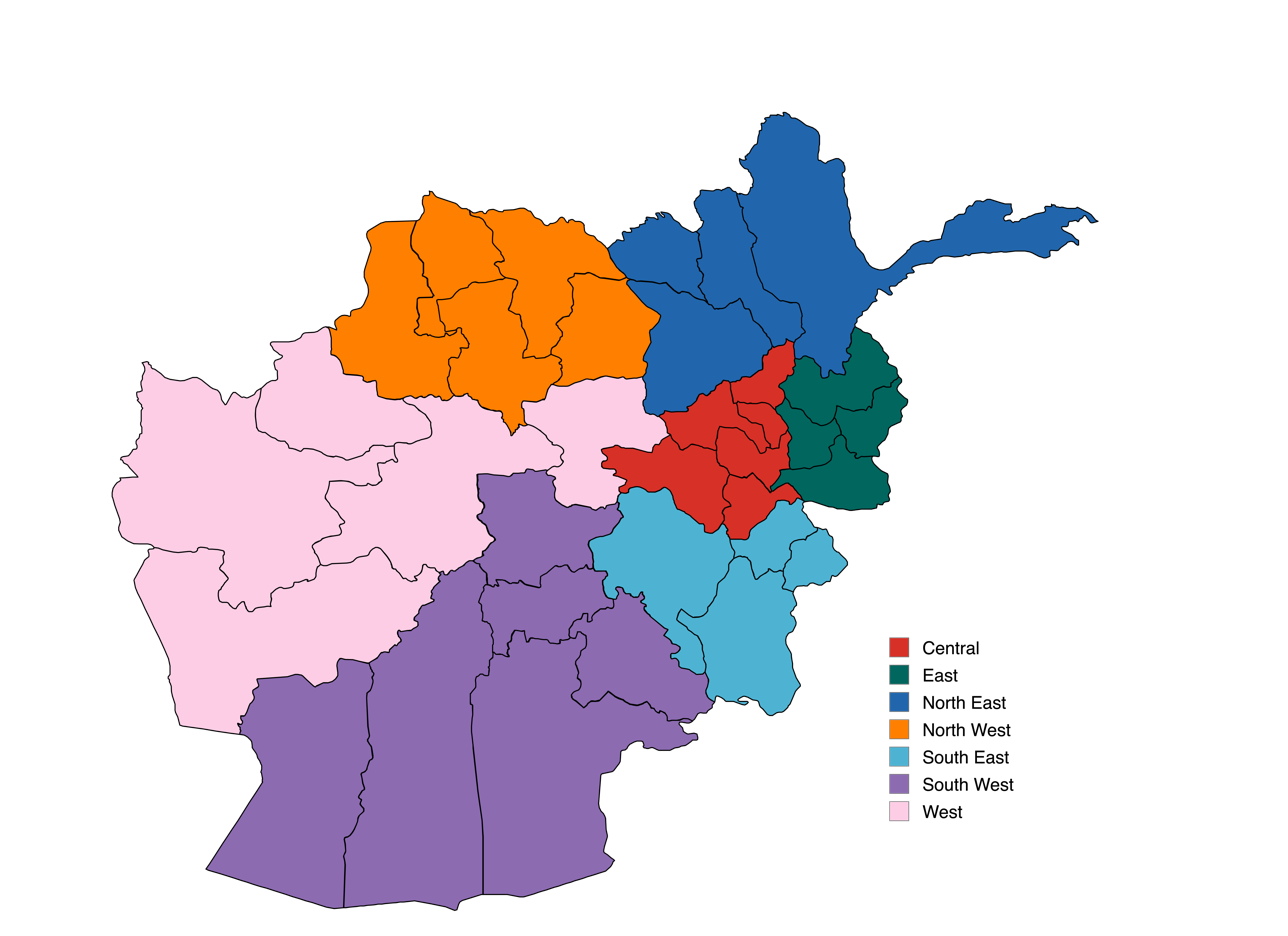
UN regions of Afghanistan

UN regions and demographic data
Region	Population	Area km^{2}	Density /km^{2}
Central	8,637,107	30,835	280.1
East	3,080,705	25,812	119.4
North East	4,632,077	83,631	55.4
North West	4,621,050	78,100	59.2
South East	3,631,460	51,795	70.1
South West	4,716,194	202,006	23.3
West	4,876,934	180,688	27.0

== See also ==
- List of current provincial governors in Afghanistan
- Districts of Afghanistan
- List of splits and creations of districts in Afghanistan
