= Afghan insurgency =

Afghan insurgency may refer to:

- The insurgency waged by the mujahideen during the Soviet–Afghan War
- The Taliban insurgency
- For the post-Taliban takeover insurgency waged by former Islamic Republic of Afghanistan members, see the Republican insurgency in Afghanistan.
