= Afghanistan Freedom Front =

Afghan military organization opposed to the Taliban

- Dari: جبههَ آزادی افغانستان; Pashto: د افغانستان د خپلواکي جبهه
- Logo of the AFF.
- Leader: Yasin Zia
- Head of the Political Committee: Daoud Naji
- Dates active: 12 March 2022 – present
- Allegiance: Pakistan
- Active regions: Nationwide across Afghanistan
- Ideology: Anti-Taliban; Federalism
- Status: Active
- Wars: Afghan conflict; Republican insurgency in Afghanistan; Battle of Zebak (2026)
- Website: af-freedomfront.com

The Afghanistan Freedom Front (AFF) (Note: Dari: جبههَ آزادی افغانستان, Pashto: د افغانستان د ازادۍ جبهه), sometimes known as the Afghan Freedom Front, is an Afghan military organization composed largely of former members of Afghan National Security Forces (ANSF). It was founded in March 2022 by Yasin Zia, a former Chief of General Staff of the Afghan National Army, and seeks to overthrow Taliban rule in Afghanistan.

Alongside the National Resistance Front (NRF), the AFF is one of the two main factions involved in the republican insurgency in Afghanistan. The two groups have also cooperated in fighting Taliban-led Afghan armed forces. The AFF has reportedly tried to recruit and support pro-NRF fighters in different parts of country, putting in perspective the NRF and AFF's joint appeal being more popular among Tajiks, Hazaras, Uzbeks, anti-Taliban Pashtuns as well as pro-Jamiat e Islami groups.

== Objective ==
The Afghanistan Freedom Front is fighting to overthrow the Taliban and seeks to establish an Afghanistan free from extremism. The group states that its objectives include defending freedom, justice, and the rights of the Afghan people. It also presents armed struggle as a necessary means of resisting Taliban rule and challenging their authority in the country.

== History ==
The Afghanistan Freedom Front (AFF) was founded in March 2022 by General Yasin Zia, who had previously served as Chief of General Staff of the Afghan National Army before the Taliban takeover in 2021. Soon after its establishment, the AFF began carrying out attacks against Taliban-led Afghan security forces, primarily in Kabul. The group also attacked Taliban forces in Badakhshan, Baghlan, Kandahar, Parwan, Takhar, Laghman, and Samangan provinces. During an armed attack in Kandahar, AFF fighters killed Abdul Sattar, a prominent Taliban commander.

Over time, the AFF expanded its operational reach and assumed a more prominent role in the anti-Taliban resistance. The group has carried out attacks on Taliban vehicles, government buildings, and checkpoints, including an indirect fire attack on Kabul Airport in mid-October 2024. The group also frequently releases videos of their attacks on Taliban-led Afghan security forces. Most of its members are former personnel of the Afghan National Security Forces (ANSF). In a report released on 28 February 2023 marking one year of its operations, the AFF stated that it had carried out 109 operations in Afghanistan, killing 361 Taliban members and wounding 364 others. The group also stated that it had an active presence in 18 Afghan provinces.

From 1 March 2023 to 21 February 2024, the group carried out attacks against Taliban-led Afghan armed forces in Kapisa, Baghlan, Badakhshan, Laghman, Panjshir, and Parwan provinces, as well as the city of Kabul. During these attacks, 231 Taliban fighters were killed and 338 were wounded. (Note: 3 killed on 10 March in Kabul, 2 killed on 30 March in Kabul, 3 killed and 4 injured on 9 May in Kapisa, 3 killed and 3 injured in Kabul on 10 May, 2 killed and 4 injured in Baghlan on 4 June, 1 killed and 3 injured in Kapisa on 4 July, 1 killed and 3 injured in Badakhshan on 9 August, 5 killed and 3 injured in Kabul on 12 August, 2 killed and 4 injured in Baghlan on 12 August, 4 killed and 6 injured in Kabul on 17 August, 5 killed and 3 injured in Parwan on 18 August, 2 killed in Kabul on 1 September, 2 killed in Laghman on 3 September, 50 killed in November, 2 killed in Panshir on 6 December, 2 killed and 1 injured in Panjshir on 13 January, 7 killed and 4 injured in Kabul on 19 February, 1 killed and two injured in Parwan on 21 February.) During the same period, eight AFF members were also killed, and several others were taken prisoner by Taliban forces during fighting. Those killed included AFF commanders Akmal Amir, Nasir Ahmad Andarabi, and Fahim Salangi.

On 11 April 2024, AFF leader Yasin Zia and NRF leader Ahmad Massoud held their first joint meeting and discussed the future strategy. During the meeting, both leaders emphasized unity and continued resistance against the Taliban. Massoud commemorated Akmal Amir and other AFF fighters killed in clashes with Taliban-led Afghan armed forces. He also praised the AFF's military activities and its more aggressive stance against the Taliban.

From 28 February 2024 to 28 February 2025, the AFF stated that it had carried out 87 targeted attacks across Afghanistan, killing 229 Taliban members and injuring 166 others. The attacks were reported in Kunduz, Panjshir, Balkh, and Baghlan, with the majority taking place in Kabul. (Note: 3 killed in Kabul on 20 April, 4 killed and 2 injured in Kabul on 29 April, 3 killed and 1 injured in Kabul on 18 May, 2 killed and 1 injured in Kabul on 21 May, 3 killed and 5 injured in Kabul on 30 May, 2 killed and 3 injured in Kabul on 1 June, 1 killed and 1 injured in Kabul on 14 June, 3 killed in Panjshir on 22 June, 5 killed and 2 injured in Kabul on 25 June, 3 killed and 1 injured in Kabul on 1 July, 2 killed and 1 injured on 5 July, 2 killed in Baghlan on 22 July, 4 killed 1 injured in Kabul on 23 July, 3 killed in Kabul on 8 August, 4 killed and 1 injured in Kabul on 19 August, 6 killed in Kabul and Balkh on 12 September, 2 killed and 1 injured in Kunduz on 4 October, 4 killed in Kabul on 19 October.) During the same period, 3 AFF members were killed in fighting with Taliban forces. The group also said that its operations had expanded to 31 provinces. Since its formation in 2022, AFF had conducted a total of 330 operations across the country, killing 821 Taliban members and injuring 868 others. During the same period, the group lost 13 of its own fighters.

On 29 May 2024, the AFF said that Taliban commander Fazluddin Osmani had been killed and three other Taliban members injured in an attack on an outpost of the Taliban's Interior Ministry in the Karte Naw area of Kabul.

On 15 August 2024, the 3rd anniversary of the Taliban's rule, the AFF has been declared that the time has come for unity, cohesion, and alignment among all anti-Taliban groups and forces.

On 19-20 October 2024, the AFF attacked Kabul Airport with missiles and a small Infantry element. The front did not release casualty numbers, but stated they had inflicted heavy casualties and damaged Taliban aircraft under repair in the Airport.

From 10 May 2025 to 31 July 2025, AFF carried out attacks in Kabul, Kunduz and Panjshir, killing 6 Taliban and injuring 5 others. (Note: 2 killed and 1 injured in Kunduz, 1 killed and 2 injured in Panjshir on 10 May, 3 killed and 2 injured in Kabul on 31 July.)

On 17 May 2026, an announcement from the AFF was made that their fighters are engaged in commando-based operations in Badakhshan.

On 12 June 2026, AFF attacked officers of the Ministry for the Propagation of Virtue and Prevention of Vice in Herat, killing 3 officers and injuring another 2.

On 30 June 2026, AFF attacked a Taliban patrol vehicle in Kunduz, killing 2 Taliban and injuring another.

From 23 to 28 July 2026, the AFF clashed with Taliban forces in the Zebak district of Badakhshan, seizing their positions in the area and killing 21 Taliban and injuring another 37. 1 AFF fighter was killed. The group also managed to down two drones operated by the Taliban.

On 27 September, 2026 the AFF fought Taliban fighters in Sar-e-Pul and Kamdesh district, Nuristan with several villages being taken in Kamdesh and Nari districts. The AFF took out Taliban fighters in Badakhsan, targeting a vehicle used by the Directorate of Mines in Faizabad.

On 29 October, 2026, Abdul Sattar Husseini, a former member of parliament from Farah province formed a new anti-Taliban resistance group known as the Afghan National Liberation Front (ANLF) with two unknown AFF members.

On 30 October 2026, the AFF indicated that it covertly acquired anti-drone tech to counter Taliban drones.

== Leadership ==
General Yasin Zia, former Chief of General Staff of Afghan National Army from 2020 to 2021, is the AFF's leader. The AFF’s leadership council is composed of approximately 50 figures, who head a range of committees dealing with areas such as foreign policy, as well as cultural and religious affairs. Daoud Naji is the head of the AFF political committee as of September 2024.

== Locations ==
According to an AFF representative, the group is mobile, but operates in Salang valley in Parwan province; the Andarab and Khost-Farang districts in Baghlan province; the Ishkamish district in Takhar province as well as Sar-e-Pol, Nuristan, and Faryab provinces. By 2025, the group had expanded its military operations to 31 provinces across Afghanistan.

== Alliance ==
=== Resistance factions ===
The AFF collaborates with the National Resistance Front (NRF) in operations against Taliban-led Afghan security forces. It also maintains friendly relations with Sami Sadat's Afghan United Front. The AFF has also called for the creation of a united front to overthrow Taliban-led Afghan government.

The AFF is also allied with the National Resistance Council for the Salvation of Afghanistan (NRCSA), which is led by Abdul Rashid Dostum, Atta Muhammad Nur, Mohammad Mohaqiq, Abdulrab Rasul Sayyaf, Ismail Khan, and other prominent Afghan politicians in exile.

=== International ===
==== Pakistan ====
The Taliban takeover of Afghanistan in 2021 resulted in a rise in Pakistani Taliban activity and other militant attacks inside Pakistan. As a result, Pakistan has increasingly looked toward Afghan opposition groups as possible alternatives to continued Taliban rule. In this context, the Afghanistan Freedom Front (AFF), led by Yasin Zia, and the National Resistance Front (NRF), associated with Ahmad Massoud, have gained renewed importance. This shift became more visible in October, when Pakistan hosted meetings with several Afghan opposition figures. These contacts brought Zia and Massoud back into political focus and strengthened the view that both the AFF and NRF could play a larger role in any effort to challenge the Taliban. Reports also suggested that the AFF had opened an office in Pakistan, adding to speculation about possible Pakistani support. Such support could strengthen both groups politically and militarily, improving their ability to organize, expand operations, and position themselves as viable anti-Taliban forces.

During the armed clashes between Pakistani forces and Taliban-led Afghan forces, Daoud Naji, head of the political committee, stated that the Afghan Taliban were sacrificing the Afghan people in order to protect the TTP. The Afghanistan Freedom Front also accused the Taliban of relocating Pakistani Taliban militants to government buildings and densely populated civilian areas, alleging that civilians were being used as human shields.
