= Afghanistan Islamic National & Liberation Movement =

Afghan militant group

- Logo of the group
- Other name: Afghanistan Liberation Movement
- Founder: Abdul Mateen Sulaimankhail
- Leader: Nasser Waziri
- Founded: February 16, 2022
- Country: Afghanistan
- Active regions: Southern and eastern Afghanistan
- Ideology: Sunni Islamism; Islamic democracy Anti-Taliban
- Status: Active
- Conflicts: Republican insurgency in Afghanistan

The Afghanistan Islamic National & Liberation Movement, also known as Afghanistan Liberation Movement (ALM), is an Afghan militant group fighting against the Taliban government of Afghanistan. The group was founded on February 16, 2022, by former Afghan Army special forces commander Abdul Mateen Sulaimankhail. It is the only anti-Taliban militant group in Afghanistan that is predominantly ethnically Pashtun.

== History ==
Afghanistan Islamic National & Liberation Movement was founded on February 16, 2022 by former Afghan Army special forces commander Abdul Mateen Sulaimankhail in response to alleged killings of former Afgan military personnel by the Taliban after their amnesty. Sulaimankhail said the group was engaged in “military and political activities” against the Taliban in 26 provinces of Afghanistan. Former security adviser of Afghan military Nasser Waziri served as the group's spokesperson. He told OKO.press that the group's ranks included "activists, lawyers, and judges" and that the group not only fights the Taliban but also engages in charitable work.

According to Shanghai Cooperation Organisation, the group is composed of former members of Afgan security forces. According to experts, it is the only anti-Taliban militant group that is predominantly ethnically Pashtun. The group is active in southern and eastern areas of Afghanistan. In May 2024, after a dispute between Waziri and Sulaimankhail, Waziri became the leader of the group. He told the Long War Journal that the group was focused "almost exclusively on collecting intelligence" and was now beginning to carry out attacks. In January 2026, Small Wars Journal said the group was operating in pockets.

== Activities ==
In April 2022, the group claimed to have conducted multiple attacks against the Taliban in Nangarhar Province and assassination of Taliban commander in Helmand Province. In May 2022, the group conducted a rocket attack against the Taliban in Waghaz District, resulting in casualties. In June 2022, the group claimed to have conducted an attack on Taliban in Qalat District, killing eight Taliban members. The group said it carried out almost two dozen attacks against the Taliban in 2022. In August 2022, after the Taliban banned girls from attending school, the group established a network of secret schools for girls in grades one through nine.

In 2023, the group conducted attacks against the Taliban in eight provinces of Afghanistan. The group claimed to be the only rebel group in Afghanistan with access to drones, but social media posts containing those claims showed it using satellite and stock imagery.

Between August 2024 and October 2024, the group allegedly conducted one attack against Pakistani Taliban. In September 2025, a report by United Nations Secretary-General António Guterres said that five militant groups claimed responsibility for 47 attacks against the Taliban, including the Afghanistan Liberation Movement, which is responsible for three attacks.
