= Battle of Zebak =

Insurgency battle in Afghanistan

- Part of the Republican insurgency during the Afghan conflict
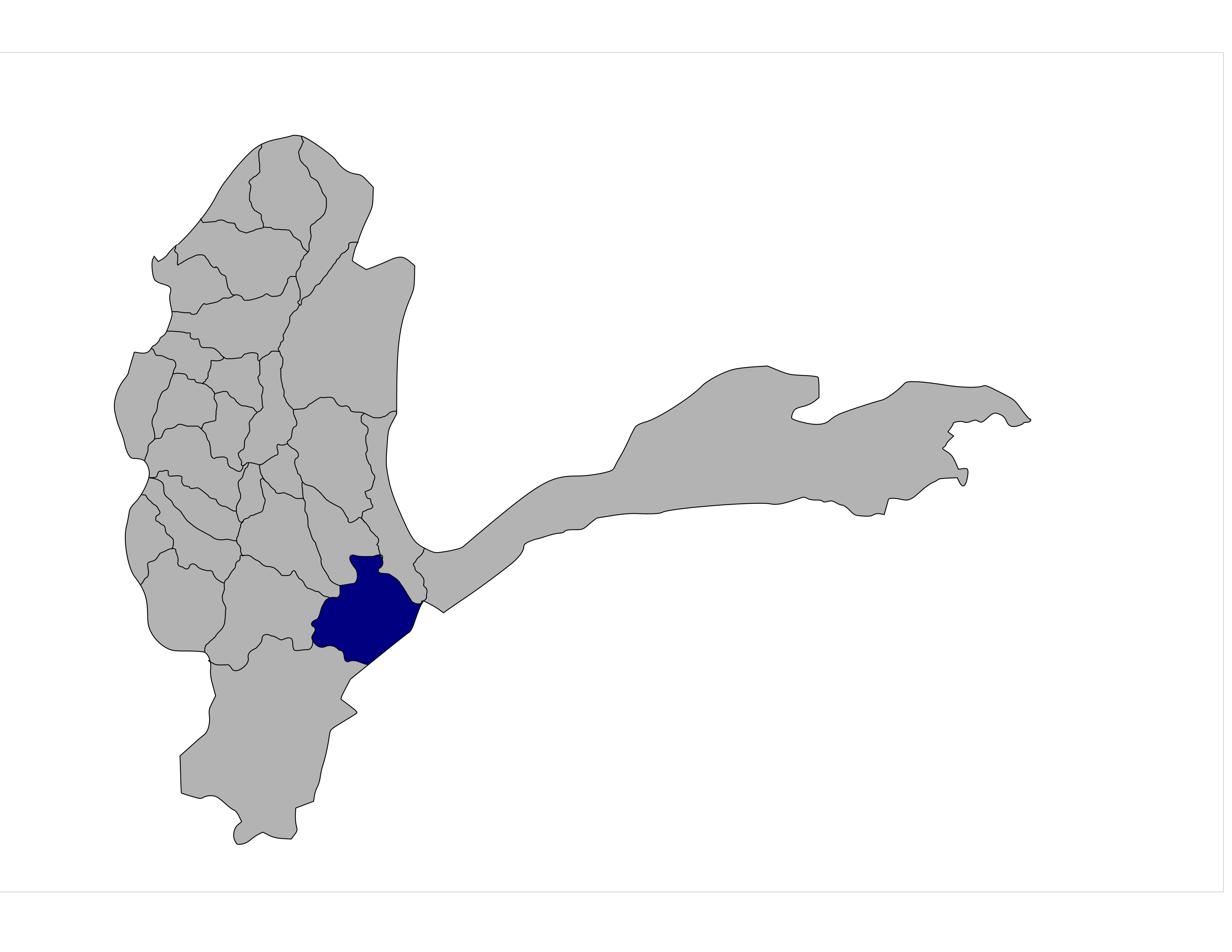
- Location of Zebak district in Badakhshan province
| Date | 23 July 2026 – 31 July 2026 |
| Location | Zebak district, Badakhshan province, Afghanistan |
| Result | AFF captures several outposts of IEA forces in Zebak district (per AFF); IEA maintains full control of Zebak district (per IEA) |

Belligerents
| Afghanistan Freedom Front | Afghanistan |

Commanders and leaders
| Yasin Zia | (Afghanistan) Amanuddin Mansoor (Afghanistan) Qari Fasihuddin |

Units involved
| Unknown | Afghan Armed Forces: Afghan Army; Zebak Border Battalion |

Casualties and losses
| Per AFF: 1 killed Per IEA: Heavy casualties | Per IEA: Undisclosed; Per AFF: 21 killed 37 injured 2 drones shotdown |

From 23–31 July 2026, fighters of the Afghanistan Freedom Front (AFF) carried out a series of attacks targeting the military bases and positions of the Zebak Border Battalion in Zebak district. According to the AFF, its fighters had captured several military positions from the forces of the Islamic Emirate of Afghanistan (IEA) in Zebak district, and repeated attempts by the IEA to retake those positions had failed. IEA officials confirmed that clashes took place in Topkhana area of Zebak district but denied losing any military position to AFF forces. Both sides claimed to have inflicted heavy casualties on the other and denied the opposing side's claims. Taliban claimed that opposition fighters had travelled from Chitral, Pakistan to Badakhshan to launch attacks.

The clashes were described as one of the most prolonged confrontations between the Taliban and an armed opposition group in Badakhshan since the Taliban returned to power in 2021. Daoud Naji, head of the AFF’s political committee, said the battle against IEA has entered a “new phase” and described it as a struggle for “Afghanistan’s liberation.”

== Background ==
The site of battle is located approximately 50 kilometres by road from the centre of Zebak district and is considered strategically significant due to its geographical location. Zebak has historically been regarded as important terrain for guerrilla warfare in Afghanistan, with its mountainous landscape, numerous valleys, and difficult-to-access routes providing favourable conditions for small, mobile armed groups. The area has maintained military significance across various periods of conflict, including the resistance against Soviet forces, the Afghan civil wars, and the Islamic Republic era (2002–2021). Zebak district was captured by the Taliban in 2017 during the Taliban's Mansouri offensive against the Islamic Republic of Afghanistan. Nearly a decade later, following the Taliban's return to power, the district became the site of repeated attacks by armed opposition groups.

== Battle ==
On the morning of 23 July, Afghanistan Freedom Front (AFF) announced that its fighters had conducted series of coordinated attacks on Zebak Border Battalion in Zebak district of Badakhshan province. AFF said that its forces had captured several Taliban outposts in the area and that the forces of the Islamic Emirate of Afghanistan (IEA) had failed to retake them. According to IEA officials, armed clashes took place in the Topkhana area of Zebak District. They stated that five insurgents were killed and several others were wounded, adding that the remaining insurgents subsequently withdrew from the area.

On 24 July, the AFF said that its fighters had killed 21 IEA soldiers, including several commanders, and wounded 37 others. AFF also said to have captured weapons, ammunition, and military equipment from IEA forces during the armed clashes. Additionally, the AFF reported that one of its fighters had been killed and that the clashes in the district were still ongoing. On the same day, the AFF said that its fighters had carried out an attack on helicopters carrying IEA reinforcements, preventing them from landing in Zebak district and forcing them to leave the area. An Afghan media outlet, citing local sources, reported that three local Taliban commanders, including Faridullah Wahdat, were among those killed. The outlet also reported casualties among AFF fighters but stated that the exact number remained unclear.

On 25 July, AFF said that its fighters ambushed Taliban military convoy which was travelling from Kabul to Badakhshan in Doshi district of Baghlan province. According to the AFF, the convoy was carrying reinforcements and military equipment, and the ambush resulted in the deaths of seven IEA soldiers and injuries to six others. Afghan media outlet quoting local sources also reported armed clashes along the Kabul–Balkh highway in Doshi district. IEA officials did not publicly comment on the reports of attack on military convoy. Amid the unrest in Badakhshan, the Taliban deployed additional reinforcements to Zebak district, and Chief of Army Staff, Qari Fasihuddin traveled to the province. On the same day, AFF said that its fighters had shot down 2 drones belonging to IEA forces in Zebak district.

On 26 July, the AFF released a video claiming to show IEA forces withdrawing from what it described as "liberated areas" of Zebak District. AFF also said that IEA forces had planted landmines around their checkpoints in district centre. On the same day, IEA officials stated that the security situation in Badakhshan, particularly in Zebak district, remained under IEA control and denied reports that the AFF had captured IEA outposts. IEA officials also stated that the AFF had suffered heavy casualties during the clashes.

On 27 July, AFF said that armed clashes between its fighters and IEA forces were continuing in the Zebak district. Residents of Zebak district have reported that heightened military activity has turned parts of the district into a heavily militarized area.

On 28 July, AFF said that its fighters had repelled an attack by IEA forces in Zebak district, killing five soldiers of IEA and injuring four others.

On 29 July, an Afghan media outlet, citing sources, reported that the Taliban were preparing a large-scale operation in Badakhshan in response to increased attacks by opposition groups, with additional forces and senior commanders being deployed to the province.

On 31 July, AFF said that its fighters had ambushed a convoy carrying what it described as "international terrorists supporting the Taliban" in Zebak district. According to the AFF, the convoy was en-route to reinforce IEA forces fighting AFF fighters in the district, and the ambush resulted in the deaths of two foreign fighters and injuries to three others. IEA officials did not respond to the claims made by AFF. The same day, the home of Qari Fasihuddin in Badakhshan province was attacked by light and heavy weapons from a nearby mountain which was overlooking the property.

== Continued clashes ==
On 6 August, AFF officials said that IEA forces had launched an attack on its defensive positions in Zebak district. According to the AFF, the assault was repelled, with five IEA soldiers killed and eleven others wounded. Separately, AFF officials also reported a rocket attack on military section of Kunduz airfield. According to the AFF, IEA forces stationed at the airfield were preparing for deployment to neighbouring Badakhshan province, and the extent of damage and casualties from the rocket attack remain unclear. IEA officials did not respond to the claims made by AFF officials.

== Reaction ==
Afghan women’s protest movement expressed support for resistance and struggle of anti-Taliban forces in Badakhshan and other parts of the country.

Zabihullah Mujahid, the IEA spokesperson, confirmed that clashes had recently occurred in Yaftal-e Payin and Zebak but stated that such incidents occur in every country and that reports of the clashes had been exaggerated for propaganda purposes.
