= Republican insurgency in Afghanistan =

Guerrilla campaign against the Taliban government

- Part of the Afghan conflict
Date	17 August 2021 – present (5 years, 3 months and 5 days)
Location	Afghanistan
Status	Ongoing: Increase in insurgent activity across Afghanistan in 2026

Belligerents
Afghanistan; Al-Qaeda; Jamaat Ansarullah	Anti-Taliban resistance; National Resistance Front; Basej-e Milli; Green Unit; Afghanistan Freedom Front; Afghanistan United Front; Afghanistan Liberation Movement; Homeland Corps Front; Ahmad Khan Samangani Front; National Resistance Council for the Salvation of Afghanistan; Other factions (Note: Freedom Corps, Liberation Front of Afghanistan, Soldiers of Hazaristan, Freedom and Democracy Front, High Council of Resistance, Afghanistan National Guardians Front, Freedom and Justice Movement, Green Movement, National Independence Front, Republican Front, People’s Democratic Front, National Guard Movement, National Revolutionary Front of Afghanistan, Freedom and Democracy Front, National Front of Liberators ect); Mahdi Mujahid's forces; Local Hazara volunteers; Local Shia volunteers; Liwa Fatemiyoun veterans; Independent militias and Taliban dissidents

Commanders and leaders
(Afghanistan) Hibatullah Akhundzada; (Afghanistan) Mohammad Yaqoob; (Afghanistan) Abdul Ghani Baradar; (Afghanistan) Fasihuddin Fitrat; (Afghanistan) Abdul Qayyum Zakir; (Afghanistan) Abdul Hamid Khorasani; (Afghanistan) Mohammed Faruq; (Afghanistan) Hidayatullah Badar; (Afghanistan) Sanaullah Sangin Fatih; (Afghanistan) Sabawoon; (Afghanistan) Amanuddin Mansur; (Afghanistan) Mullah Samiullah Mewand †; (Afghanistan) Qari Abdurrahman Omari †; (Afghanistan) Mullah Hebat Khan †; (Afghanistan) Mullah Malang Helmandi †; (Afghanistan) Abdul Rahman Mansour †	Ahmad Massoud; Qadam Shah Shahim; Khalid Amiri; Hasib Quwayi Markaz †; Hamid Saifi; Munib Amiri; Saleh Mohammad Registani; Ghazi Muradi †; Abdul Wadud †; Khair Mohammad Andrabi †; Qayyum Malang; Yasin Zia; Amrullah Saleh; Bismillah Khan; Abdul Rashid Dostum; Abdulrab Rasul Sayyaf; Ismail Khan; Mohammad Mohaqiq; Atta Muhammad Nur; Ahmad Zia Massoud; Nasir Ahmad Andarabi †; Akmal Amir †; Sami Sadat; Mahdi Mujahid †

Units involved
Islamic Emirate Armed Forces; 217 Omari Corps; 219 Omer-e-Salis Division; Badri 313 Battalion; Taliban special forces (including ex-Red Unit); Lashkar-e Mansouri Martyrdom Battalion; Air Unit; Various pro-Taliban militias; Foreign Mujahideen (possibly affiliated with al-Qaeda); Jamaat Ansarullah fighters	National Resistance Front of Afghanistan; ANSF remnants; Afghan National Army remnants; Afghan Air Force remnants; Afghan National Police (GiRoA) remnants; National Directorate of Security remnants; Ahmad Massoud's militia; Andarab Resistance Front; Various non-NRF militias; Anti-Taliban Hazara militias; Mahdi Mujahid's militia (23 June – 17 August 2022)

Strength
160,000 soldiers and 210,000 police forces and pro-Taliban militia (2024 self-claim)	20,000–30,000 (Panjshir resistance; estimates); c. 10,000 (Ahmad Massoud's forces; self-claim); Unknown number of independent militias

Casualties and losses
Per Taliban: Undisclosed; Per ICM: 2,598 killed, 868 injured (Note: Till 2 March 2025, NRF had killed 1,777 Taliban fighters while AFF had killed 821 and injured 868 Taliban fighters.) Equipment: Unknown number of military equipment and vehicles lost; 2 drones shot down; 1 Mil Mi-17 helicopter shot down	Per ICM: 249 killed (Note: Till 2 March 2025, IEA forces had killed 236 fighters of NRF and 13 fighters of AFF.); Per media reports: Heavy casualties Equipment: Unknown number of military equipment and vehicles lost

The Republican insurgency in Afghanistan is an ongoing conflict waged by armed factions loyal to the defunct Islamic Republic of Afghanistan against the Taliban-led Islamic Emirate of Afghanistan. The conflict started immediately following the fall of Kabul in August 2021, and the insurgency represents the continuation of the decades-long Afghan conflict. The insurgency is primarily conducted by former Afghan government security personnel, local militias, and political and military organizations seeking to oppose or overturn Taliban rule.

The principal anti-Taliban organizations involved in the insurgency include the National Resistance Front of Afghanistan (NRF) and the Afghanistan Freedom Front (AFF), alongside a number of smaller resistance groups and local militias. Fighting has occurred in several parts of Afghanistan, particularly in the north and northeast, including Panjshir, Baghlan, Badakhshan, Takhar and Kunduz provinces, as well as in and around Kabul.

The conflict has largely taken the form of guerrilla warfare, ambushes, attacks on Taliban security personnel and installations, and other small-scale operations, although the intensity and geographic scope of fighting increased in 2026. The Taliban-led government officially refers to armed resistance forces as "evil and corrupt groups" (shar-o fasad) and portrays the insurgency as limited in scale, often downplaying the significance of attacks in its public statements. Since the 2026 Afghanistan–Pakistan war, the Taliban authorities accuse Pakistan of being the primary supporter of resistance groups, claiming that the latter has provided safe havens for them in the Chitral region of northern Pakistan.

== Background ==
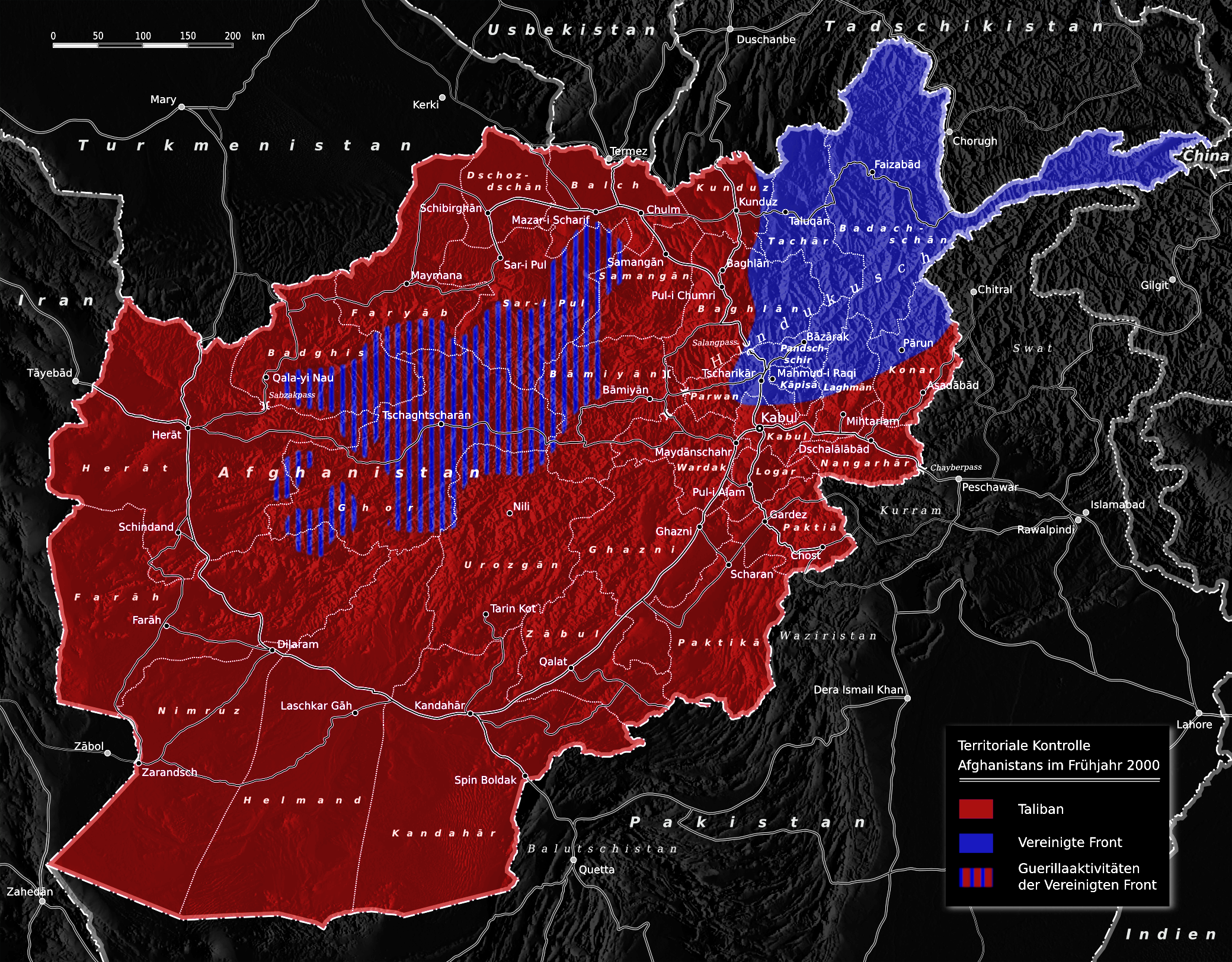
Military situation of Afghanistan in 2000, with the Northern Alliance (blue) and other factions including Hazaras (blue striped) resisting the Taliban (red).

Historically, the Panjshir Valley was known for its natural defences. Surrounded by the Hindu Kush mountains, Panjshir never fell to the Soviets during the invasion of the 1980s nor to the Taliban during the civil war of the early 1990s. In the war of 1996–2001, Panjshir was a center of the anti-Taliban Northern Alliance. In these conflicts, Panjshir was under the leadership of Ahmad Shah Massoud who was killed by a suicide bomber in 2001. Soon after, the United States invasion of Afghanistan resulted in the overthrow of the previously dominant, Taliban-led Islamic Emirate of Afghanistan and the eventual establishment of the Islamic Republic of Afghanistan. Massoud and his family remained highly respected in Panjshir in the next two decades.

The traditional anti-Taliban sentiment of the Panjshiris has an ethnic dimension: A majority of the population of the Panjshir Valley are ethnic Tajik people, while the majority of the Taliban are Pashtuns. However, in course of the Taliban insurgency, the Taliban began to recruit Tajiks into their ranks in an effort to improve their image in the northern areas of Afghanistan.

In 2021, the Taliban overran most of Afghanistan in a lightning offensive; Panjshir Province was the only area which was able to resist until the offensive's conclusion. However, the valley's ability to withstand future Taliban assaults was hampered by it being cut off from outside support. In the 1980s and 1990s, Panjshir's forces had been able to keep supply lines to Tajikistan open. These were not accessible in the 2021 conflict, as the Taliban had successfully taken most of northern Afghanistan. Regardless, the former Islamic Republic of Afghanistan initially continued to exercise de facto control over the Panjshir Valley, which was described by The Week as "the only region out of [the] Taliban's hands" as of August 2021. Former loyalists to the old republic fled to Panjshir, hoping to transform it into an anti-Taliban stronghold.

== Saleh and Massoud's announcements ==
On 17 August 2021, former first vice president of Afghanistan Amrullah Saleh —citing provisions of the Constitution of Afghanistan— declared himself caretaker president of Afghanistan from the Panjshir Valley, and vowed to continue military operations against the Taliban from there. His claim to the presidency was endorsed by Ahmad Massoud and Islamic Republic of Afghanistan Minister of Defence Bismillah Khan Mohammadi along with the Embassy of the Islamic Republic of Afghanistan in Dushanbe. On 23 August 2021, Massoud made contact with unnamed American lawmakers.

== Disposition of forces ==
=== Islamic Republic of Afghanistan and anti-Taliban militias ===
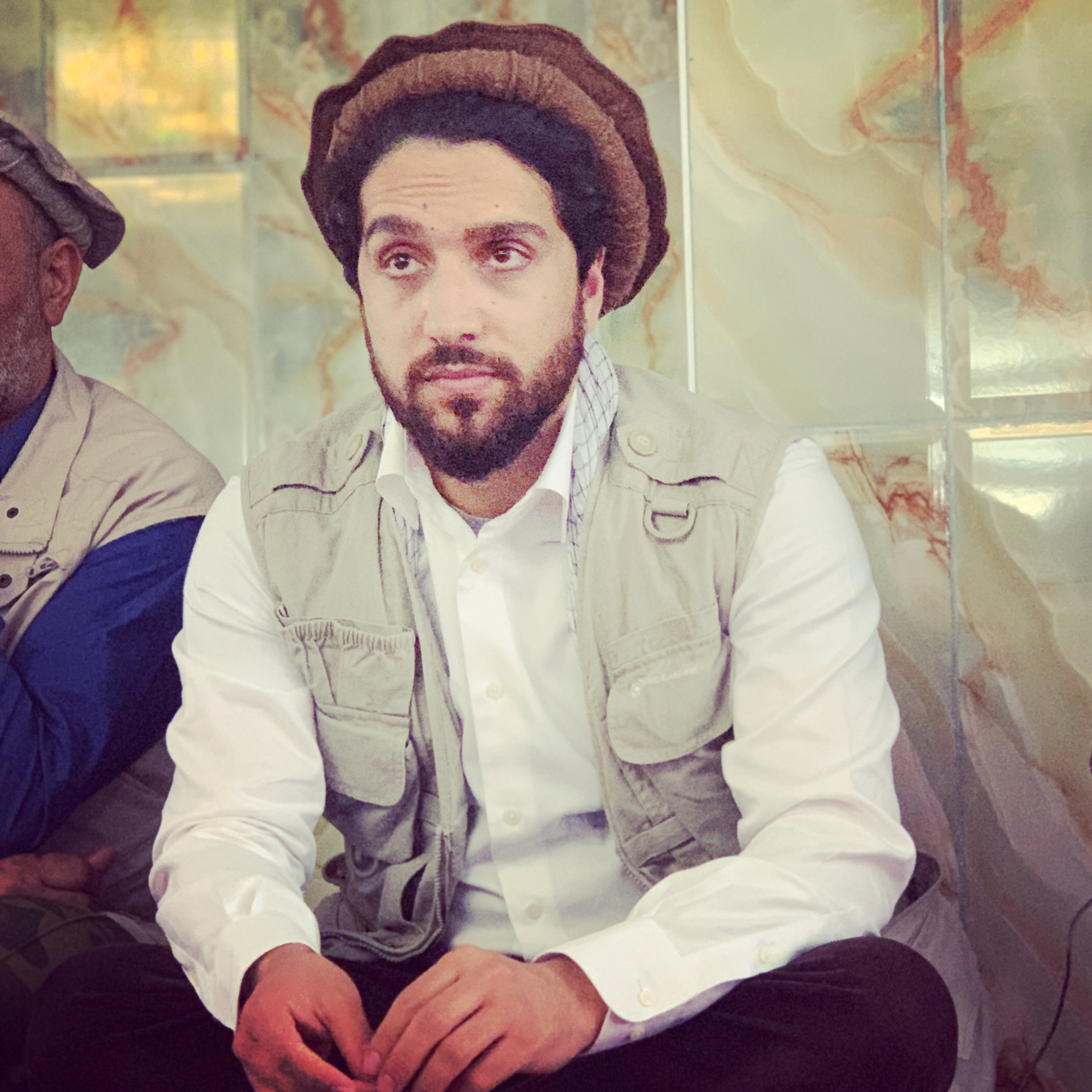
Ahmad Massoud

Prior to the fall of Kabul, Panjshiris began moving military equipment from surrounding areas, including helicopters and armored vehicles, into Panjshir Province. There, they were joined by Afghan National Army commanders and soldiers, including commandos, ex-Mujahideen who had previously served Ahmad Massoud's late father, Ahmad Shah Massoud, and other anti-Taliban activists. Most of them regrouped at Baghlan Province's Andarab District before moving to Panjshir after making their escape from Kunduz, Badakhshan, Takhar, and Baghlan. According to a Russian estimate, the disparate Anti-Taliban forces had approximately 7,000 personnel under arms as of mid August 2021. Other estimates place this number as low as 2,000, though Saleh himself claims 10,000 men under arms. By 22 August 2021, Ahmad Massoud claimed to have gathered about 9,000 fighters and at least a "handful of armoured humvees" in the valley.

The resistance forces in Panjshir organized as National Resistance Front (NRF). Within the NRF, there were differences between the forces loyal to Saleh and those loyal to Ahmad Massoud, as the former is hardcore anti-Taliban and anti-Pakistani, whereas the latter maintained good relations with Pakistan which was supportive of the Taliban. As a result, Massoud was more willing to negotiate with the Taliban. By 22 August, the resistance also confirmed that several local militias had begun to fight the Taliban on their own, independent of the Panjshir-based forces. According to Yasin Zia, the resistance had already secured access to five helicopters formerly used by the Afghan military. The NRF was greatly weakened by the fall of most of Panjshir to Taliban troops in September 2021, though the group continued to operate and expanded its activity across northern Afghanistan over the next months. By April 2022, the NRF was estimated to field a few thousand fighters, split into several branches such as the Andarab Resistance Front. By 2024, the NRF had expanded its operations and included members of several different ethnic groups, though its center of operations remained northern Afghanistan.

Other pro-republican insurgent groups emerged after the fall of Panjshir. These included the "Ahmad Khan Samangani Front", Afghanistan Freedom Front (AFF), "Afghanistan Islamic National & Liberation Movement", the "High Council of National Resistance", the "Freedom Corps", "Liberation Front of Afghanistan", "Soldiers of Hazaristan", the "Freedom and Democracy Front", the "Wolf Unit", "National Front for Free Afghanistan", "Turkestan Freedom Tigers", and "Afghan United Front" (AUF) under Sami Sadat. By 2024, the AFF had become the most important republican rebel group aside of the NRF; the two groups coordinated their operations.

=== Islamic Emirate of Afghanistan ===
An estimate by the Combating Terrorism Center at the United States Military Academy made prior to the fall of Kabul estimated the strength of the Taliban, throughout the whole of Afghanistan, at 60,000 armed cadre supported by up to 200,000 irregulars. Due to the rapid capitulation of the Afghan National Army, the Taliban have since acquired substantial materiel of US manufacture, including armored vehicles and combat aircraft. The Taliban remain a movement consisting of many different sub-groups whose aims, strategies, beliefs, and loyalties vary.

By March 2022, the Armed Forces of the Islamic Emirate of Afghanistan had taken over the previous government's land force corps, and deployed their own air force -consisting of helicopters- in combat against the republican rebels. By 2024, the Islamic Emirate's military remained largely in control of Afghanistan, though it had also become affected by the corruption and "ghost soldiers" just as the previous Afghan military.

== Timeline ==
=== 2021 - Emergence of Panjshir resistance and first anti-Taliban revolts ===
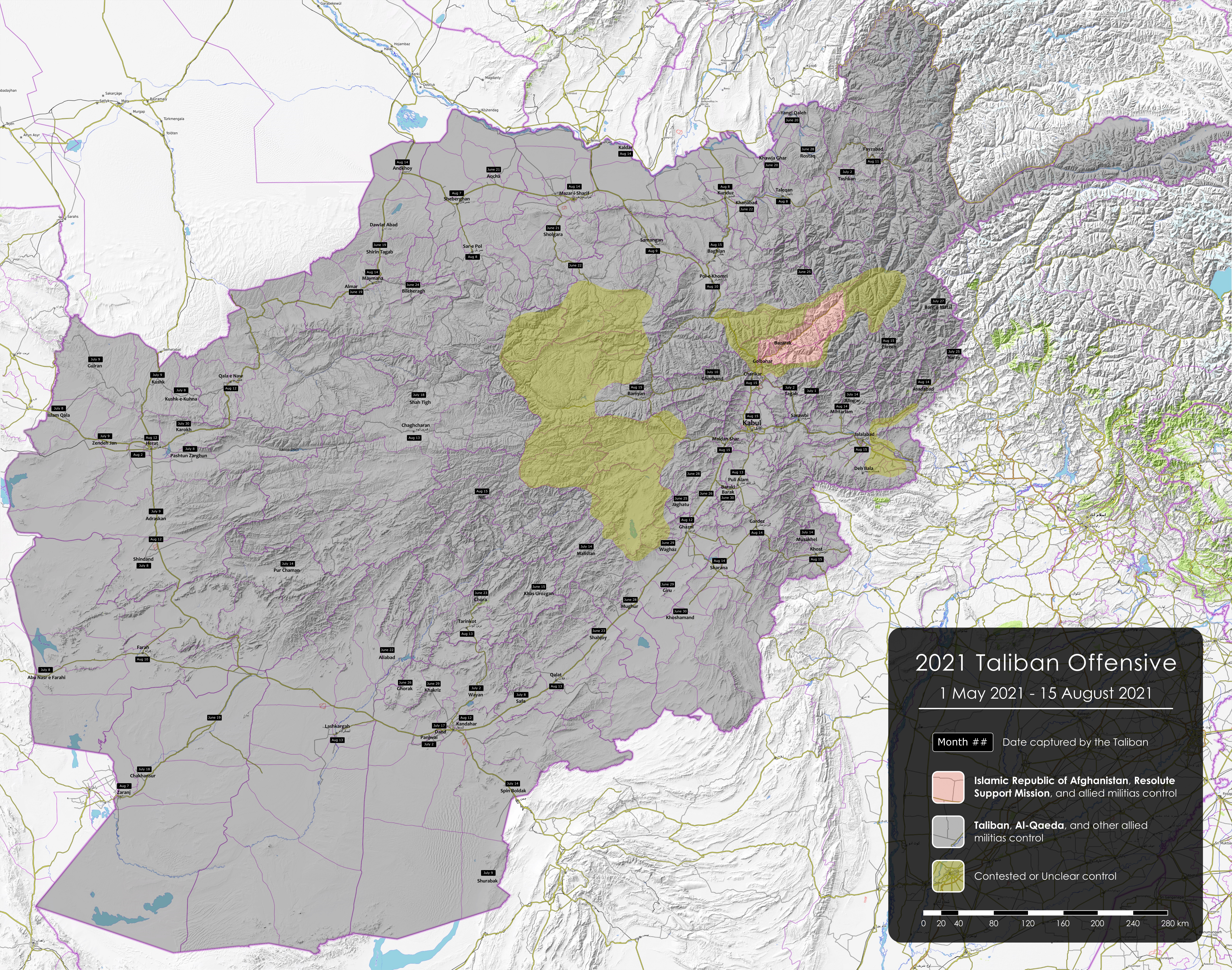
Military situation of Afghanistan at the start of the conflict. Smaller republican holdouts in various provinces are not included.

Around 17 August 2021, remnants of the Afghan National Army began massing in the Panjshir Valley at the urging of Massoud, along with local civilians who had responded to his mobilization calls. At the time, the Panjshir Valley was—according to one observer—"under siege on all sides" but had not come under direct attack. On 18 August, the number of admissions for war injuries was increasing at the Emergency Surgical Centre for War Victims in Anaba in Panjshir. By 22 August, Ahmad Massoud's forces were mostly focused on defending Panjshir as well as training.

On 17 August, a negotiated end to the political impasse had been attempted, with Saleh calling for a "peace deal" with the Taliban. On 18 August, the possibility of including the Taliban in a coalition government was raised by a top Afghan diplomat as a means of ending the stalemate.

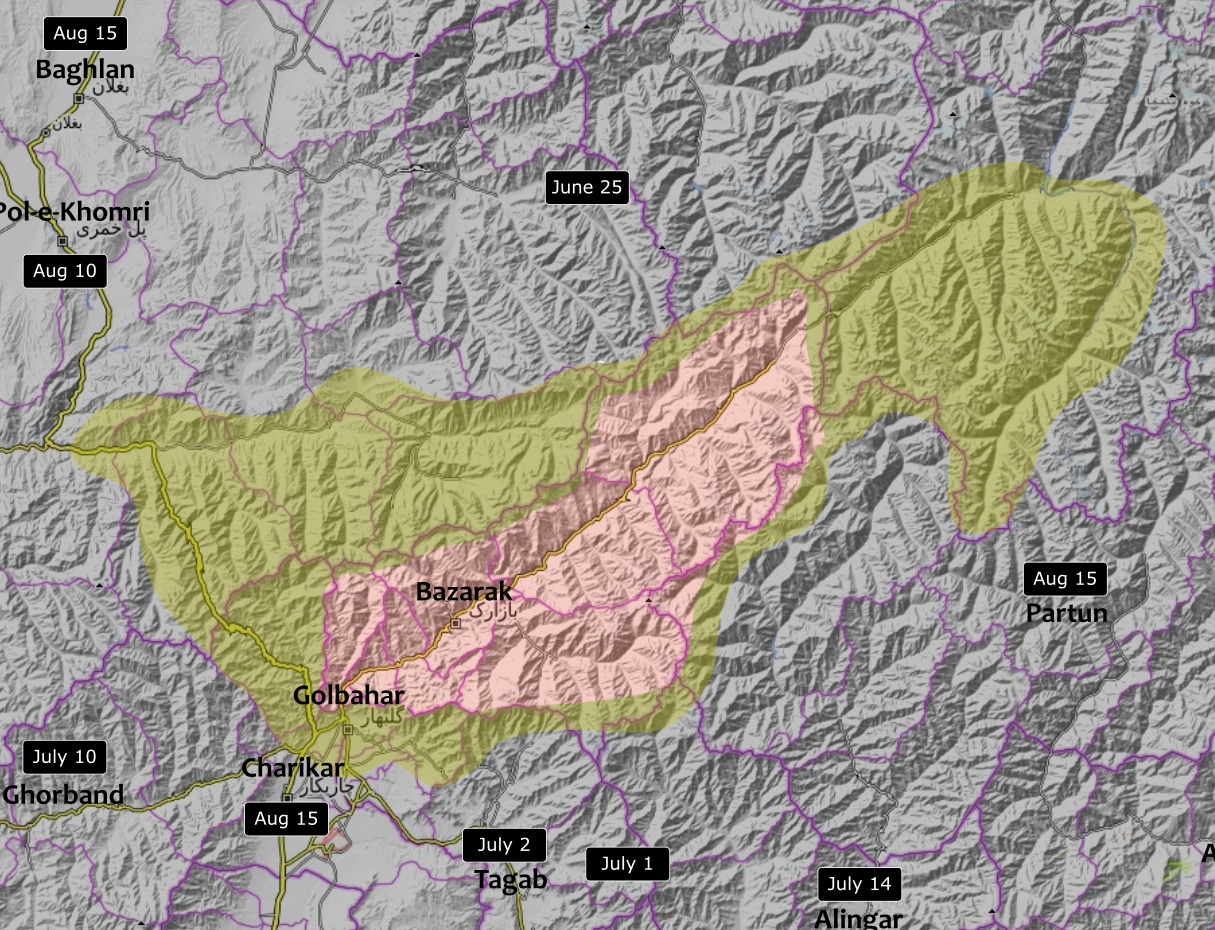
Map of the Taliban offensive on Panjshir as of 18 August 2021

On 18 August, local sources from Parwan Province reported that Saleh's forces had taken Charikar from Taliban fighters stationed in the area. In addition, there are reports of gunfights taking place near Salang Pass. On the following day, videos were released which showcased local fighters with flags of the old, anti-Taliban Northern Alliance parading through the streets of Charikar.

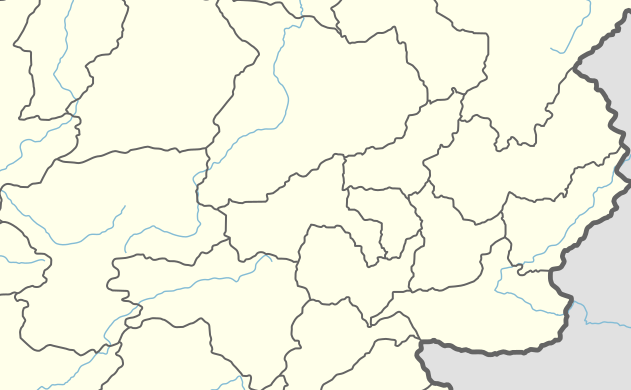
Approximate locations of fighting, 17–23 August 2021

On 20 August, anti-Taliban fighters reportedly recaptured Andarab, Puli Hisar and Dih Salah districts in Baghlan Province with the Taliban claiming 15 of its soldiers had been killed, while other sources reported that up to 60 Taliban fighters were killed or injured, and two dozen captured. The three districts had reportedly experienced a revolt, led by a local police chief, after Taliban had conducted unpopular house-to-house searches. Bismillah Khan Mohammadi announced the operational success of the districts being recaptured via Twitter.

Audiovisual reports of the events circulated on social media and were reported by Pajhwok Afghan News. Later on the 20th, it was reported that the forces, led by Abdul Hamid Dadgar, had recaptured Andarab, though the Taliban had not yet commented.

On 21 August, it was reported that Panjshir representatives were meeting with Abdullah Abdullah and Hamid Karzai, members of the Coordination Council, to "discuss the current situation and ways of providing security to Afghans".

A source within the Panjshir resistance consequently confirmed their involvement in the operations in Baghlan Province, and stated that they planned on seizing a northern highway which could allow them to link up with Tajikistan and Uzbekistan. Taliban social media accounts called the counteroffensive a "betrayal" of the amnesty the Taliban had offered. It was reported on 22 August 2021 that Taliban fighters had been sent to the Keshnabad area of Andarab in order to kidnap the children of anti-Taliban forces.

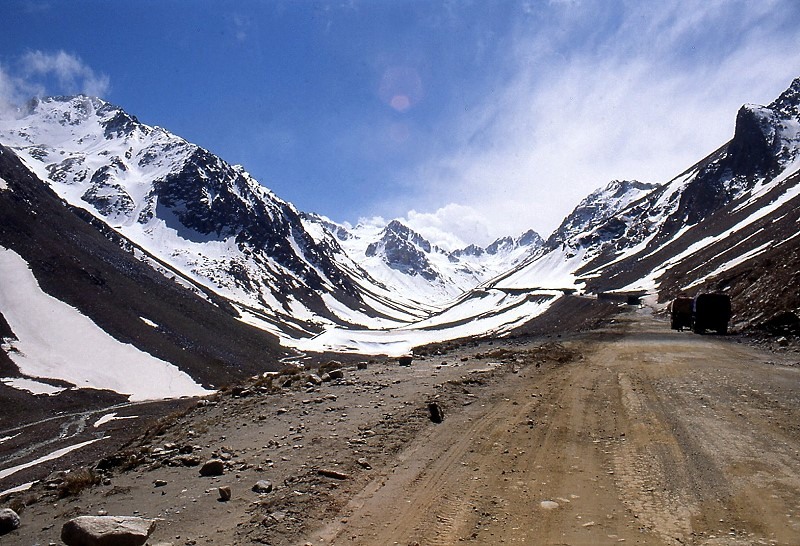
As of 18 August 2021, Islamic Republic forces were reportedly battling the Islamic Emirate for the Salang Pass (pictured 2005).

On 22 August, the Russian Embassy in Afghanistan was reportedly asked by a Taliban representative to reach out to Panjshir-based leaders to possibly mediate. Meanwhile, resistance spokesman Ali Nazary informed the Agence France-Presse that Ahmad Massoud's group would prefer a peaceful resolution of the conflict, under the condition that a future government implemented a system of "decentralisation" and "equal rights" across the country. On 23 August, Taliban spokesman Zabihullah Mujahid said that while Taliban fighters are being sent to Panjshir, the Taliban are willing to seek peaceful means to end the conflict.

Simultaneously, the Taliban gave the opposition forces a four-hour ultimatum to surrender. In a statement to Al Arabiya, Massoud rejected the ultimatum. In response, the Taliban announced "hundreds" of its forces had been dispatched to the Panjshir Valley. It was reported on 23 August that talks between Taliban representatives and Panjshir leaders had broken down. Ali Maisam Nazary, spokesman for the resistance, said that the Taliban made demands for Massoud to accept no elections with a centralized government, which Massoud rejected as he wanted a future government to be decentralized, with respect for civil and semi-autonomy rights.

An unidentified Taliban spokesperson proclaimed in a statement that "hundreds of Mujahideen of the Islamic Emirate are heading towards the state of Panjshir to control it, after local state officials refused to hand it over peacefully". It was reported that on 23 August, Taliban commander Qari Fashihuddin was tasked to lead offensive operations in Panjshir. The Taliban reported that several of their fighters were killed and others wounded in ambushes in Jabal Siraj.

On 23 August, the Taliban claimed to have recaptured all 3 districts in Baghlan that fell to the resistance forces a week ago: Dih Salah District, Pul-e-Hisar and Andarab. A Taliban district chief stationed in Andarab was reported to be killed in the fighting. On 24 August, Panjshir resistance fighters reportedly retook control of Banu and Dih Salah districts, while Puli Hisar remained under Taliban control. Saleh publicly warned via Twitter that Taliban fighters in Andarab were blocking humanitarian assistance for civilians trying to escape from the fighting and called it a "humanitarian disaster". On the following day, Massoud's forces claimed to have ambushed a Taliban convoy in Andarab, destroying a critical bridge and inflicting heavy losses on the Islamists.

On 24 August, Major Wazir Akbar, an ex-Afghan commando who joined the Panjshir-based resistance fighters, reported an attempted Taliban incursion at Anjuman Pass through Badakhshan province, which was repelled with heavy Taliban casualties.

=== Ceasefire and sporadic clashes ===
On 26 August 2021, a ceasefire was declared with the Taliban and the resistance entering into talks. Taliban spokesman Zabihullah Mujahid said that he was "80 percent confident of a solution without war in the Panjshir Valley". On 29 August, Panjshir representatives stated that there were no Taliban fighters trying to enter Panjshir, refuting information from Anaamullah Samangani, who is a member of the Taliban's Cultural Commission. On 1 September, it was reported that ceasefire talks failed.

On 26 August, fighting had broken out between anti-Taliban fighters in Panjshir Valley and the Taliban. It was reported that more than 200 Taliban fighters were driven out the Panjshir Valley, with some being captured by anti-Taliban forces. The National Resistance Front (NRF) was also able to capture Pol-e-Hesar, Deh Salah and Banu districts.

On 28 August, Panjshir fighters engaged Taliban fighters in Sanjan, Kapisa and in Khost Wa Fereng, Baghlan in response to allegations of ceasefire violations conducted by Taliban fighters in the area.

On 29 August, internet and telecommunication services throughout Panjshir province were shut down on orders from the Taliban.

On 30 August, Panjshir fighters ambushed Taliban fighters attempting to break into Panjshir from Andarab.

=== Taliban offensive and revolts in central Afghanistan ===
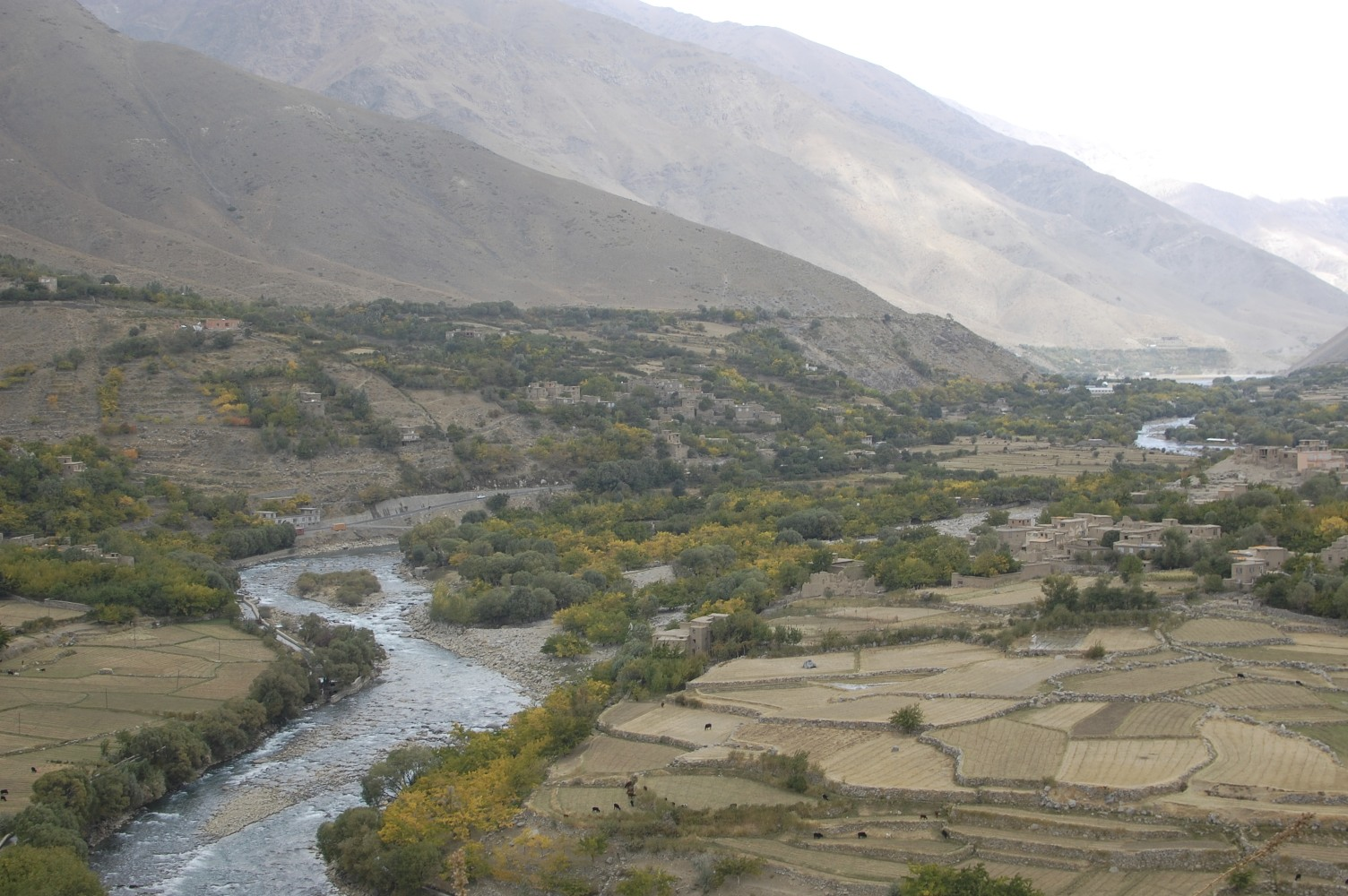
Panjshir Valley, the center of the anti-Taliban resistance, has been described as being extremely difficult to conquer.

On 31 August 2021, Taliban fighters commenced an offensive against the National Resistance Front in the provinces of Baghlan, Panjshir, and Parwan. Anti-Taliban sources claimed that the offensive involved al-Qaeda troops, a statement backed by videos in which pro-Taliban fighters were heard speaking non-native or locally uncommon languages such as Arabic. Sources reported that the offensive started when Taliban fighters were spotted entering Gulbahar and blocked the main road with a container. Taliban forces retook Dih Saleh District in Baghlan, allowing them to directly attack Panjshir. An initial Taliban assault through Khawak Pass connecting the Baghlan and central Panjshir Provinces failed. NRFA spokesperson Fahim Dashty said that the attack was likely done to test the area's defenses. Taliban troops also began to attack southern Panjshir from Gulbahar, resulting in heavy fighting. Despite being numerically superior to the defenders, the Taliban failed to break through. A refugee interviewed later by Al Jazeera stated that the Taliban had blocked roads out of Panjshir using shipping containers during their offensive, and the shutdown of internet connections and mobile phone services left residents unable to learn what was happening in other places.

On 1 September, a day after clashes at the entry points of the valley were reported, Mullah Amir Khan Motaqi, the head of the Taliban's commission for guidance & encouragement stated over a Twitter audio message to the people of Panjshir that attempts at reaching a negotiated settlement were "unfortunately all in vain." He lay the blame with the leadership of the resistance in Panjshir, saying there are still some people in the valley who "don't want the problems to be solved peacefully." He went on to say that Taliban has selected a native of the province as their desired governor. Despite the Taliban shutdown of Panjshir's internet, Fahim Dashti, the spokesperson for the Panjshir Resistance managed to conduct an interview with BBC Persian, in which he stated that the negotiations failed because of a fundamental difference of goals between the two sides. According to him, Panjshir resistance had the intention of extracting commitments and guarantees protecting freedoms and human and political rights of ethnic and religious minorities as well as women, but Taliban's goal in the negotiation was not to negotiate such guarantees, but to negotiate the extent of participation of the Panjshir opposition in a Taliban-led government that would satisfy the resistance.

On 2 September, Panjshir sources claimed that 13 Taliban fighters were killed in an ambush in Chikrinow district. Even though the offensive had stalled by this point, a Taliban spokesman said the valley was surrounded in all four directions and that a Panjshir resistance 'victory was impossible' as well as claiming Taliban territorial gains. Meanwhile, the Taliban claimed to have pushed into the Shotul district of Panjshir, but provided no firm proof for this claim. Analysts judged that the Taliban had probably advanced for a short time before being pushed back again. A minor Taliban attack on Anjuman Pass in northern Panjshir was reportedly easily repelled by Afghan commandos. In addition, local anti-Taliban forces from Andarab claimed to have retaken the crucial Khawak Pass.

Meanwhile, revolts had erupted in Wardak Province and Daikundi Province which are home to many Hazaras, an ethnic group which had been previously discriminated against by the Taliban. The Taliban had begun reaching out to the Hazara community in the months leading up to their takeover, promising to respect their rights and traditions. Accordingly, the situation in Wardak and Daikundi is complex, as local militia leaders had aided the Taliban takeover despite the disapproval of much of the population. In Daikundi's Khadir District, a revolt erupted as the pro-Taliban Hazara commander Muhammad Ali Sedaqat was ordered to disarm locals, with some fearing that the disarmament was not properly recorded and would expose locals to harassment by the Taliban. Fighting consequently broke out between the Taliban, pro-republic Hazaras, and pro-Taliban Hazaras. Local militias began to ambush Taliban troops.

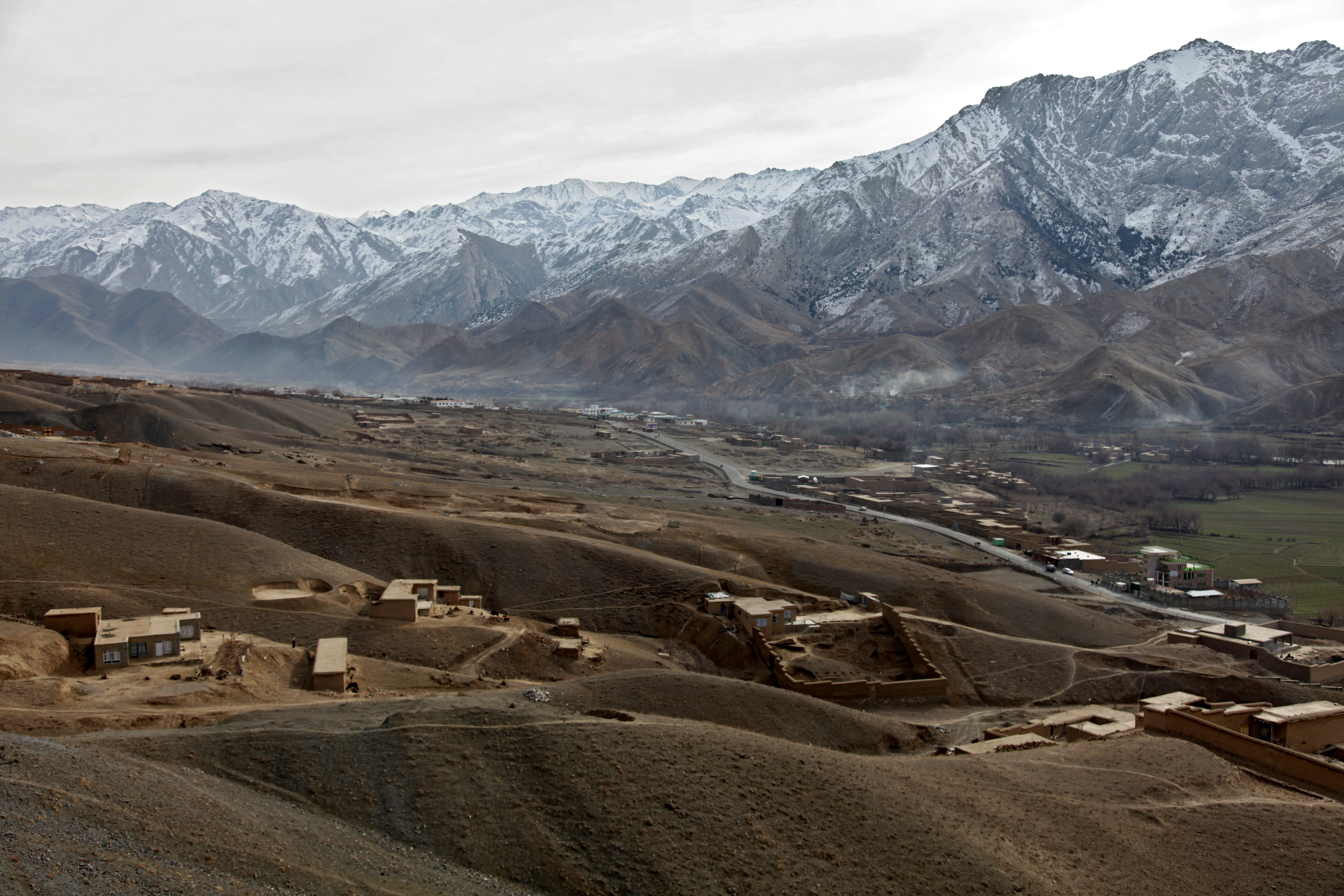
By 4 September, Taliban forces had reached Anaba (pictured 2010).

On 3 September, the Taliban claimed to have captured Panjshir valley, however these claims were described as lies and propaganda by the local resistance leaders such as Saleh as well as international spectators. A NRF spokesperson stated that the situation was "difficult", but also that a Taliban push into the valley had resulted in the encirclement of a few hundred Taliban fighters. By the following day, heavy fighting was confirmed to be still continuing in the valley, with Paryan District reportedly being contested. An Italian medical aid organisation operating in the area confirmed that the Taliban had advanced up to Anaba; the Taliban claimed to have seized the districts of Khenj and Unabah. The NRF countered by claiming that they had managed to encircle even more Taliban troops, now numbering thousands, at Khawak Pass and Dashte Rewak.

On 5 September, both sides achieved some successes: The NRF was able to force hundreds of encircled Taliban fighters to surrender in the valley, with the NRF claiming to have captured up to 1,500. In turn, local journalists confirmed that the Taliban had taken both Rukha and Paryan Districts, while NRF spokesman Fahim Dashty was killed in combat. The Taliban also claimed to have advanced into Panjshir's capital Bazarak. A The Times reporter who accompanied the Taliban testified that much of the valley appeared to be under Islamist control at this point, although groups of NRF fighters continued to strike at the Taliban behind the frontlines. Massoud reacted to the Taliban advance by declaring on Facebook that he was endorsing offers by local religious leaders to negotiate a peaceful solution of the conflict. Pakistani journalist and regional expert Ahmed Rashid argued that the Taliban had clearly expressed that they would not "tolerate what [Massoud is] asking for, which is a semi-autonomous region in the Panjshir Valley". The Taliban leadership indeed rejected Massoud's negotiation offer, stating that it would only accept the NRF's surrender.

=== Siege of final Panjshir Valley holdouts and exile activities ===
On 6 September, after heavy fighting resulting in high losses on both sides, the Taliban captured the governor's office in Bazarak, and claimed control of the whole Panjshir Valley. The remaining NRF troops had reportedly retreated into the mountains, with the Taliban stating that many had fled the region. An NRF official then claimed Massoud was at a safe location, while Saleh escaped to Tajikistan. Ali Nazary, head of foreign affairs for the resistance group, said that Ahmed Massoud was still present inside Afghanistan. The NRF contested the Taliban's conquest of Panjshir, arguing that resistance fighters were still present in strategic positions in the valley, continuing their fight.

By 7 September, many civilians from Panjshir Valley had fled into the mountains to escape the Taliban, while Massoud made defiant statements and called for a large-scale, nation-wide uprising. The Panjshir locals were also threatened by starvation, as local supply remained cut-off. The remaining NRF troops were reportedly still resisting the Taliban in some areas. The NRF also claimed that the Taliban had begun to massacre local civilians.

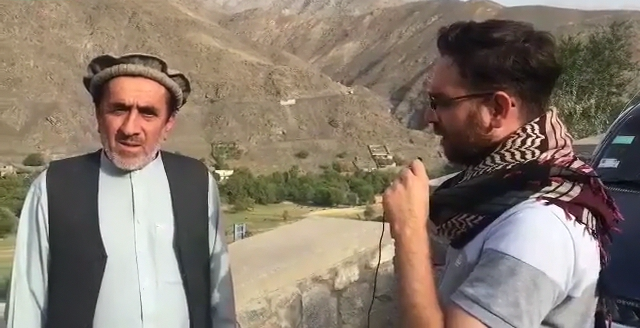
Iranian media interviewing an NRF fighter, 11 September 2021

As of 9 September, OSINT evidence analyzed by Bellingcat researchers shows that the Taliban continue to advance, and control territory at least 60 kilometres (37 mi) into the valley. The Taliban has placed the valley under siege, not allowing journalists or goods to enter, so the extent of their control is difficult to surmise. Panjshir residents who were able to reach Kabul warned that supplies in the province are being exhausted due to the blockade. NRF spokesman Ali Nazary claimed that the Taliban had not conquered all of Panjshir, but only the main road, which allowed them to capture nearby Bazarak as well. He stated that the resistance forces had made a tactical withdrawal from the main road, while retaining 60–65% of the sub-valleys and strategic positions under their control. Mohammad Zahir Aghbar, the Islamic Republic of Afghanistan's ambassador to Tajikistan, meanwhile stated that Massoud and Saleh were still in Afghanistan but incommunicado for security reasons and had not fled to Tajikistan, contrary to earlier reports.

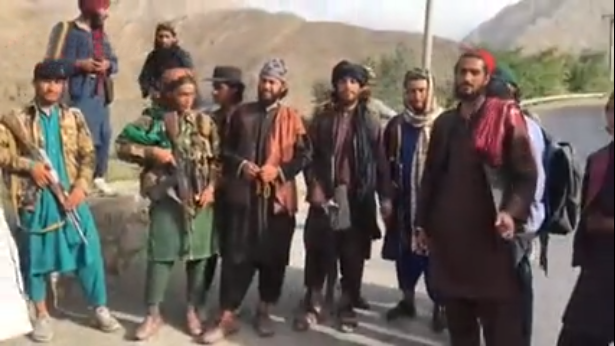
Taliban fighters near Marshal Fahim stadium in Panjshir, 11 September 2021

By 10 September, the Taliban had captured the residence where Saleh had earlier been hiding and aired his latest video claiming he was still in Panjshir, with photos of a Taliban fighter posing at the same spot where Saleh had recorded the video, being posted on social media it was later claimed that Rohullah Saleh, Amrullah's brother, was killed while trying to escape the region. A three-day ceasefire was reported to be in effect, although not confirmed by any side. National Congress Party leader Abdul Latif Pedram meanwhile told TOLO News that NRF forces were present in all mountains of Panjshir. NRF commander Saleh Rigistani vowed that their forces will continue fighting, and added that the province was facing a shortage of food and medicinal supplies. Taliban Cultural Commission member Anaamullah Samangani however claimed that the NRF had no "public presence" in Panjshir and were hiding in caves and valleys, with talks for their surrender ongoing. Residents meanwhile complained that roads in Panjshir were blocked, while electricity and telecommunications were shut.

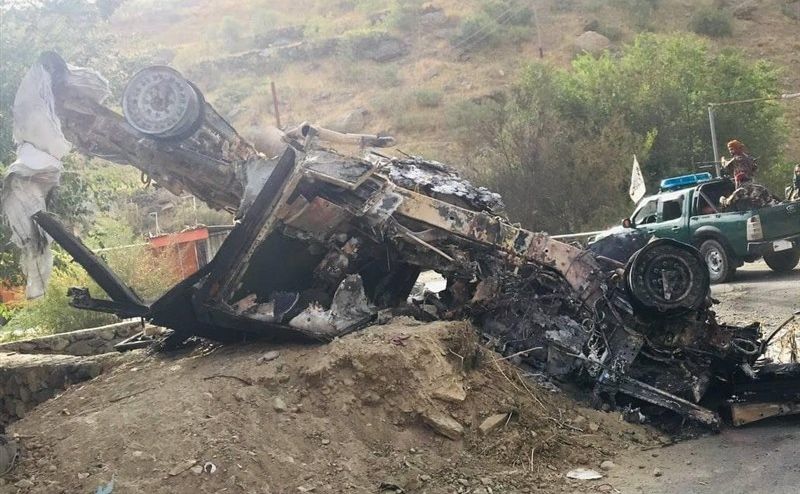
Taliban forces move past a destroyed vehicle in the Panjshir Valley, 12 September 2021

A tribal elder meanwhile stated on 10 September that the Taliban was blocking food supplies and carrying out extrajudicial executions of civilians, adding that eight civilians were reportedly killed by them on 7 September. Ahmad Wali Massoud also accused the Taliban of killing civilians and stated that the NRF still controlled "major areas" in Panjshir. Saleh's son Shuresh stated on 11 September that his father's brother Rohullah Azizi, who had been fighting for the resistance, had been executed alongside his driver on 9 September by the Taliban, after being stopped at a checkpoint in Khanez village of Panjshir.

An investigative report published by the BBC on 13 September found that the Taliban had executed at least 20 civilians in Panjshir since they entered the valley. Taliban spokesman Zabiullah Mujahid meanwhile denied the group had committed any human rights violation in the province. Agence France-Presse reporters allowed into Panjshir on 15 September found many villages in the three districts they visited nearly empty. Residents interviewed by them accused the Taliban of executing 19 civilians between the village of Khenj and Bazarak, and preventing civilians from fleeing the province in order to use them as human shields against attacks by resistance fighters. A doctor in Panjshir meanwhile told Al Jazeera that all hospitals in the province had been closed or were operating on limited supplies, except for an Italian-run emergency hospital.

Journalists of The New York Times allowed into Panjshir on 13 September reported that fighting had mostly ceased, as the Taliban controlled much of the valley and the NRF was apparently limited to the nearly inaccessible mountain areas. Some local forces had also left the NRF without surrendering to the Taliban, instead acting as autonomous self-defense groups and controlling parts of the valley. In late September, a United States intelligence official, a US Department of Defense consultant, and two former Afghan government officials confirmed that Massoud and Saleh had fled to Tajikistan shortly after the Taliban took control of most of the valley. Massoud was relocated to a safe house in Dushanbe and Saleh to a nearby location. Regional experts argued that the reports of the exile of the NRF leadership were reliable and believable. Massoud, Saleh, Pedram, and others were reportedly attempting to organize further anti-Taliban resistance from Tajikistan. However, researchers judged their future prospects to be poor, as Tajikistan was supportive of them but probably unwilling to risk cross-border fighting, while the Taliban had managed to gain much international support, entrenching their position. Despite these reports, the NRF continued to claim that its leaders were still in Panjshir, and that the insurgency was continuing.

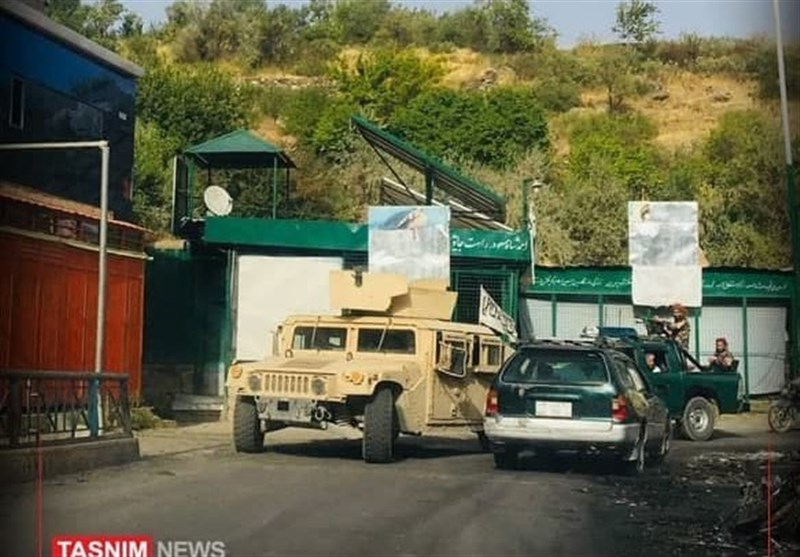
Taliban Humvee and technical drive past defaced Ahmad Shah Massoud placards after the fall of Panjshir Valley.

On 6 October, Abdul Latif Pedram claimed that guerilla warfare continues in Panjshir. TASS reported heavy fighting at Zamankur, Anaba District. By early November 2021, Jacob Zenn argued in Terrorism Monitor that there were no more militant forces loyal to Massoud operating in Afghanistan, while the NRF continued its efforts to reorganize an insurgency. The government of Tajikistan was still hosting and supporting the remnants of the anti-Taliban political opposition, although more so to improve its image abroad and domestically than to actually influence the situation in Afghanistan. At this point, the only substantial armed resistance to the Taliban government was offered by the Islamic State's Khorasan Province (IS-KP). Zenn argued that IS-KP's insurgency was growing and could potentially allow pro-republican forces to make a comeback as the Taliban and the Islamic State were focused on fighting each other. However, some NRF holdouts continued to be active in Panjshir. On 15 October, Russian news agency Interfax reported NRF forces conducting a guerilla attack in Andarab, Baghlan, with Taliban losses being reported as six killed, four wounded, and two being captured by pro-NRF forces. At the same time, fighting was also reported in Balkh, with both sides suffering unknown casualties. Around late October, a visit by Radio Télévision Suisse into Bazarak would report an armed confrontation between the Taliban and pro-NRF forces occurring in an undisclosed location in the mountains surrounding Bazarak. The latter reportedly gained the upper hand with unknown casualties on both sides, thus confirming that the NRF is still active near Bazarak and in Panjshir despite claims of inactivity by local Taliban officials.

=== Guerrilla campaign by the NRF and other groups ===
On 12 November 2021, clashes between republicans and Taliban forces took place at Khoshudara, located in Baghlan Province's Khost wa Fereng District. Both sides suffered several losses. A local informed The Independent that the NRF still held settlements in Khost wa Fereng.

On 29 November, a clash between Taliban and pro-NRF forces reportedly occurred in Samangan Province, with reportedly two republican fighters killed and one wounded from the engagement. The Independent reported that according to local sources a militia of 400 men took control of the mountainous area of Tondruk including 10 villages, located between the Hazrati Sultan District and the provincial capital of Aybak. The same source reported that in October, local Taliban officials attempted to take over the area, although the attack was called off due to the harsh terrain of the region and the military readiness of the local pro-NRF militia. The Samangan militia became known as the "Ahmad Khan Samangani Front", and consisted of several groups which were loyal to a commander named Hekmatullah Tour. The group was not part of the NRF, though aligned with it.

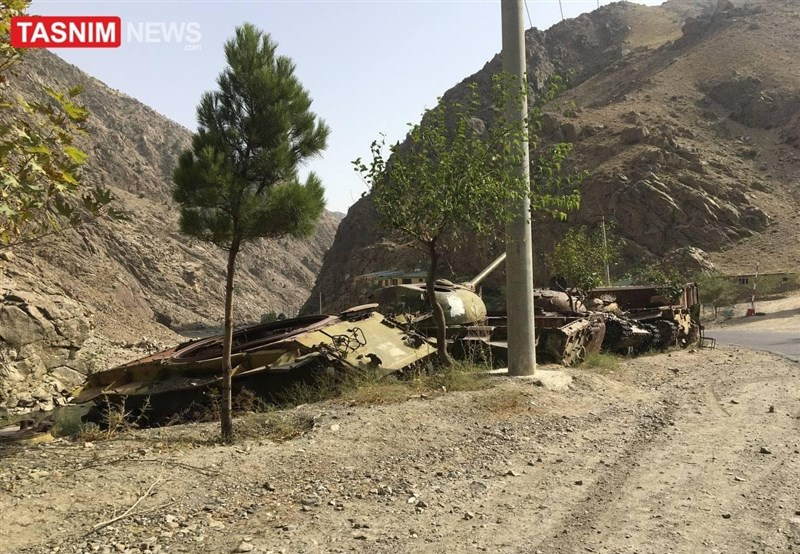
Destroyed tanks in Panjshir Valley

On 6 and 7 December, NRF and Taliban forces clashed in the Hesa Duwum Kohistan District of Kapisa Province, with five Taliban militants killed or wounded, and two NRF killed (according to Mehr News Agency). Islamic World News had reported that according to local sources, NRF forces under the command of Hamed Seifi, General Kouhestani, General Hasibullah and General Munib Amiri, have been carrying out hit and run attacks against Taliban militants in the mountainous areas of Panjshir, Kapisa and Baghlan provinces. They also reported that an assassination of a Taliban member in the Kalafgan District of Takhar Province initially thought to have been carried out by ISKP, might have been perpetrated by the NRF, although the true perpetrators are yet to be confirmed. An independent anti-Taliban militia still held territory in Samangan Province as of December 2021.

On 20 December, a member of the NRF in Baghlan reported to The Independent that the local resistance attacked Taliban positions in the village of Kaftarkhaneh, with the Taliban being driven out of the village and suffering 8 casualties, with four killed and four more wounded. NRF spokesman Sibghatullah Ahmadi would go on to confirm the engagement, also stating that pro-resistance forces had conducted attacks in Badghis Province on the same day, with unknown casualties. The spokesman also claimed on 17 December that the NRF had conducted attacks in 14 Afghan provinces (Kabul, Kapisa, Samangan, Takhar, Parwan, Badghis, Laghman, Balkh, Faryab, Ghazni, Ghor, Herat, Nangarhar, and Kunar provinces), killing 61 Taliban fighters within the last 8 days, while allegedly suffering 43 casualties with one dead and 42 wounded, alleging that more pro-NRF guerilla organizations will "soon announce their presence".

On 26 December, hundreds of civilians from Anaba district, Panjshir went out to protest in response to the killing of Mohammad Agha by Taliban-affiliated militants. The victim was allegedly not associated with the National Resistance Front, however some reports stated that he served as a police officer in the previous Afghan government, who returned to his home believing in the promise of amnesty for those associated with the previous government given by the Taliban after the Fall of Kabul. Local Taliban officials confirmed the killing, claiming it was a misunderstanding, while promising to prosecute the perpetrators of the killing. In response to the killing, hundreds of civilians marched to the governor's office, chanting anti-Taliban slogans like "death to the Taliban" and "long live Ahmad Massoud". While the motives for the killing of Mohammad Agha have not been confirmed, the Taliban had been engaging in numerous summary executions and forced disappearances of former members of Afghan security forces, with the victim count being over 100 as of November, 2021, contrary to the promise of amnesty given to former government associates by the Taliban. The incident also allegedly occurred days after an attack conducted by the NRF in Panjshir against the Taliban. The deputy chief of security of Panjshir Abdul Hamid Khorasani was reported to have clashed with the protesters, although no casualties were reported.

=== 2022 ===
On 2 January 2022, The Independent reported that in the preceding few days, the Ahmad Khan Samangani Front clashed in the village of Kichi Manghar in the Hazrati Sultan district of Samangan, killing at least two members of the Taliban including a commander, while one of the militia's commanders was killed by the Taliban in the engagement. According to the source, a few hours after the end of the clash, Taliban forces attacked the village of Kichi Mungar and killed two of Abdul Halim's relatives who were not associated with the militia. There were also reports of fighting between the NRF and the Taliban in the Ishkamish District, Takhar Province, with one Taliban and one NRF member being killed in the village of Elich during the clashes. The Taliban has so far refused to comment on the attack. In the same month, photos of NRF fighters were shown having Russian PG-7VR tandem warheads for their RPG-7s, suggesting that they have outside sources that helped them provide said warheads.

Talks between NRF and Taliban representatives were held in Tehran, Iran on 8 and 9 January, but were ultimately unproductive. On 12 January, Taliban security forces arrested Makhdum Alem, a long-time Uzbek Taliban commander. This sparked protests and a short-lived revolt at Maymana, as his supporters temporarily seized the city. After four days of negotiations, the uprising ended and the locals reaccepted Taliban rule, although Alem remained under arrest. Observers believed the short-lived revolt was a sign of the remaining tensions between the northern ethnic groups and the Pashtun-dominated Taliban, with even Uzbek as well as Tajik Taliban suspicious of the government.

On 21 January, the Taliban leadership announced that its security forces had killed eight resistance fighters in a clash in Balkh Province, and seized their munitions. Three days later, a battle between the NRF and Taliban erupted in Baghlan's Khost wa Fereng District. Both sides lost several fighters, with the Taliban reportedly trying to arrest suspected pro-NRF civilians and besieging the village of Kazar. By the end of January, local media claimed that NRF guerrillas were still operating and occasionally attacking Taliban groups in the provinces of Baghlan, Balkh, Badakhshan, and Faryab. In contrast, combat was no longer reported in Panjshir at the time.

On 13 February, a group affiliated with the NRF announced its existence in Farah Province, one of the first pro-NRF groups to emerge in a predominantly Pashtun province. It is commanded by Idris Mobarez, who is the son of Mohammad Salim Mobarez, a former commander of Ahmad Shah Massoud. Around that time, the NRF had increased its attacks against the Taliban. On 19 February, fighting resumed in Panjshir as NRF-aligned forces launched a missile attack into Darah, while pro-NRF troops located in the mountains of Panjshir clashed with local Taliban forces. The latter confirmed the engagement, but did not provide any further details. At the same time, local Afghan media had reported that the Taliban had launched air and ground attacks against resistance positions in the Andarab District, with unknown casualties.

On 16 February, the Afghanistan Islamic National & Liberation Movement announced its existence, which is believed to be the only Pashtun-led anti-Taliban insurgent group so far. It is led by former Afghan Army special forces commander Abdul Mateen Sulaimankhail. On 13 April, in an interview with the Afghanistan International TV network, Sulaimankhail claimed his group was engaged in "military and political activities" in 26 out of Afghanistan's 34 provinces, although researchers questioned that claim. The group was most likely responsible for the assassination of Taliban commander Maulvi Hanzala in Lashkargah, Helmand Province on 13 March.

On 12 March, a new anti-Taliban insurgent and civil group, the Afghanistan Freedom Front (AFF), had emerged, after reports of its existence started circulating in early February 2022. The group is separate from the National Resistance Front of Afghanistan, and mainly composed of former Afghan soldiers. As of early March, the AFF had already launched ambushes in Baghlan, Kapisa, Parwan, and Panjshir, with the Taliban reportedly using heavy weapons and air operations to suppress AFF-aligned resistance cells.

On 22 April, two people including the nephew of Atta Muhammad Nur were killed in a firefight in Balkh against local Taliban forces. This incident was possibly connected to the emergence of the High Council of National Resistance, a rebel group which was reportedly led by Nur, and backed by many former anti-Taliban warlords and politicians such as Abdul Rashid Dostum, Muhammad Mohaqiq, and Abdul Rasul Sayyaf. The High Council received support from NRF leader Ahmad Massoud.

On 30 April, NRF forces led by Khari Mohammad Andarabi carried out attacks against Taliban bases in the villages of Taghanak and Paskundi in the Pul-e-Hesar district, in the Andharab region of Baghlan. Casualties were reported on both sides, with 11 Taliban fighters and one NRF commander, Sabzali Andarabi, killed in the fighting, according to Hasht-e Subh Daily. Over the preceding weeks, the NRF had carried out attacks across the northern provinces.

In May 2022, the NRF announced a new offensive against the Taliban in Panjshir.

On September 15, 2022, a video circulated online showed captured individuals executed for supposedly being associated with the NRF.

==== Rebellion in Balkhab and expanded NRF operations ====
On 6 May 2022, the NRF launched an offensive, reportedly capturing three districts in Panjshir Province. The NRF spokesman Ali Nazary stated that the NRF had taken control of the three district's roads, villages, and outposts, after which they besieged the local Taliban offices. He also stated that "Many Taliban fighters have asked for time to surrender. The enemy has suffered heavy casualties." Taliban officials denied any fighting in the area. Local Panjshir residents reported heavy fighting during the night. The NRF also stated that the group would continue their presence across 12 provinces, mostly in the north. On 9 May, the NRF ambushed a Taliban vehicle in Qala-e-Olang and killed an unknown number of Taliban fighters, which they responded by firing on civilians in Qasan village as retaliation for the ambush. Approximately 30 Taliban fighters had been killed in the NRF offensive as of 12 May. The Taliban subsequently sent reinforcements from other provinces to bolster their garrisons in Panjshir. Fighting was concentrated at Abdullah Khel which the NRF temporarily seized before retreating. On 17 May, the first meeting of the Supreme Council of National Resistance took place in Ankara, Turkey with Abdul Rashid Dostum being involved.

On 31 May, four NRF fighters were executed by the Taliban in the Tagab District, Badakhshan, while destroying an NRF hideout in the district according to Taliban security officials.

By early June, NRF guerrilla attacks in Panjshir were taking place "regular[ly]" or "nearly daily". Despite the growing number of losses on both sides, the Taliban still claimed that there was no more resistance in the valley, even as they sent up to 10,000 reinforcements to strengthen their positions in Panjshir. The NRF claimed that it had expanded its operations into 12 provinces. However, researcher Roshni Kapur argued that the different anti-Taliban rebel groups were still too fractured and divided to pose an existential threat to the Taliban government.

On 10 June, local sources reported heavy clashes in the Karaman valley area in Dara District, Panjshir between the NRF and the Taliban, after the latter attacked several positions of the former. It occurred after a "two-day break" in the fighting. No casualties were reported in that instance. Two days prior, a clash occurred in the Paryan district, Panjshir, with reportedly 20 Taliban fighters and one NRF fighter killed.

On 11 June 2022, a Hazara Taliban commander, Mehdi Mujahid, rebelled against the Islamic Emirate, citing anti-Hazara policies by the Taliban. As Mehdi Mujahid's forces controlled Balkhab District, the entire district consequently passed under insurgent control. Pro-republican forces, including the NRF, voiced support for Mehdi Mujahid's forces. In the following weeks, Taliban forces repeatedly attempted to retake Balkhab, but were repelled. On 16 June 2022, the NRF shot down a Taliban Mil Mi-17 in the Arezoo valley. During the shootdown of the helicopter, NRF fighters killed two Taliban fighters and captured four more. By 25 June, according to anti-Taliban sources, Mehdi Mujahid's forces had surrounded "hundreds of Taliban fighters" in the Bakhlab district, with dozens of Taliban fighters killed or wounded during the preceding days. By the end of June, NRF attacks were confirmed in Badakhshan, Kabul, Panjshir, Kapisa, and Takhar Provinces. The Taliban imposed a blockade on Kohistan District, Kapisa, as the NRF had launched an offensive there. Besides Mehdi Mujahid's rebellion, clashes between different Taliban factions were also reported in Baghlan, Bamyan, and Faryab Provinces.

Between 16 and 17 June, the Taliban carried out multiple operations against NRF bases in Rokha, Anaba, and Shotul districts. In the Chamalwarda area of Rokha district alone, 51 Taliban fighters were killed or wounded, while two NRF fighters were killed and another wounded.

On 22 June, an audio tape was published in which the Taliban acting minister of defence Mullah Yaqoob mentioned that several Taliban outposts in the Khavash valley in the Khost wa Fereng District were evacuated and capture by NRF forces, while complaining about the Taliban's purported lack of obedience and organization.

On 8 July, NRF fighters engaged Taliban forces in the Khost district, Baghlan and took control of several areas. On 10 July, NRF forces attacked a Taliban outpost in Baghlan, killing two Taliban fighters and destroying a military vehicle.

Sometime around early July, the Taliban captured Golwarz village near Bakhlab as part of a general campaign against the Bakhlab insurgents. Several war crimes were reportedly committed by the Taliban against the mostly Hazara population throughout the campaign, causing refugees to flee to neighboring provinces.

Starting on 13 July, the Taliban and the NRF clashed in the Khenj and Shotul Districts of Panjshir. On 16 July, a planned offensive by the Taliban in the Arzoo valley of the Shotul district was met with an NRF counterattack led by Haseeb Qowai Markaz, which resulted in 12 Taliban dead and 9 wounded. This came after the Taliban had reportedly launched several attacks on NRF positions in the valley, only to be repelled by NRF forces.

On 16 July, fighting flared up in the Qasan valley of Andarab as part of a series of clashes in Baghlan province. By the next day, the Taliban reportedly lost 17 fighters with 10 more injured, while NRF casualties were not reported besides three being injured. Fighting would continue up to 21 July, during which Taliban fighters committed war crimes including beheading a 17-year-old boy despite no confirmed affiliation with any resistance group.

On 19 July, an armed clash between Taliban forces and NRF in Shutal district of Panjshir province left Qari Abdurrahman Omari, a commander of Taliban's Red Corps, and his four comrades dead.

On 20 July, the Taliban launched an offensive against NRF positions in Warsaj District, Takhar province, reportedly gathering over 300 fighters for the job. On 23 July, according to Iranian state-owned news Pars Today, the Taliban discovered and confiscated an ammunition warehouse in Varsaj District, Takhar province.

On 25 July, NRF forces based in Kapisa province attacked Taliban positions in the Kohistan District, reportedly killing three Taliban fighters and wounding two. On 27 July, a senior NRF member had announced that it had carried out an offensive against a Taliban base in the Kalahan village, Kapisa on the night of 26 July. According to the NRF, five Taliban members were killed and one was wounded in the attack.

On 10 August, fighting flared up in Panjshir between the NRF and Taliban, with the latter reportedly losing 25 fighters, while no casualties were reported for the NRF side.

On 15 August, the one year anniversary since the fall of Afghanistan, the NRF launched an offensive in Panjshir, reportedly capturing seven villages in the Bazarak, Dara, Annaba, Shotul, Paryan, and Khenj districts, while surrounding Taliban fighters in several positions. Up to 40 Taliban fighters were captured in the Dara district, a statement which was backed by former Vice President Amrullah Saleh. By 16 August, 58 Taliban fighters were reportedly killed, with another 12 wounded, while casualty figures for the NRF were not reported. At the same time, the Taliban launched an operation in the Ishkashim District, Takhar, only to be besieged by the NRF in the village of Anjiristan on 15 August. On the next day, clashes occurred in the Ishkashim and Chal Districts, with the Taliban reportedly suffering heavy casualties according to the NRF. In the previous two weeks, the NRF had reportedly carried out several offensive attacks in the Farkhar District.

On 17 August, the Hazara anti-Taliban rebel Mehdi Mujahid was captured and executed by the Taliban in the Kohsan District of Herat Province, who was reportedly attempting to travel to Iran prior to his execution.

On 18 August, the NRF and Taliban clashed in the Taghanak village of Pul-e-Hesar district in Baghlan, resulting in 10 Taliban fighters killed and 8 wounded. At the same time, more NRF-Taliban clashes reportedly occurred in the Qeshlaq village of the Rustaq District of Takhar province, in which a local member of the Taliban intelligence was killed. Simultaneously, a fight broke out in the Raghistan District of Badakhshan, with the Taliban claiming three NRF killed.

On 19 August, the NRF reportedly attacked a Taliban checkpoint in the Darah District of Panjshir, resulting in 10 Taliban fighters killed according to the NRF.

On 21 August, Abdul Qayyum Zakir was appointed as the military commander of Panjshir province. Long War Journal notes that Zakir appointment to lead the fight against National Resistance Front (NRF) in Panjshir and the district of Andarab is a clear indication that the NRF is challenging the Taliban's primacy in central and northern Afghanistan. At the same time, several local sources had reported that the Taliban had converted 32 schools across Panjshir into military bases, likely as a result of the increased clashes in Panjshir. On the same day, the NRF claimed that 7 Taliban members were killed and 5 others wounded as a result of a Taliban convoy hitting a roadside mine in the Rukha district of Panjshir.

On 6 September 2022, the Taliban mobilized 500 fighters from Herat to be deployed in Panjshir. Young people in Jowzjan were paid by the Taliban to fight against the NRF.

On 10 September, there were gunfights between NRF and Taliban forces in Hesarak, Parian, Abshar, Dara and Hessa I districts. Taliban forces in Paryan have told villagers to leave.

On 14 September, the Taliban claimed to have killed 40 rebels during an anti-insurgency operation in the province.

In mid-September, a video was released by Taliban militants showing the execution of at least 27 men, allegedly captured rebels somewhere in Panjshir. Afghan Witness (AW) - an open-source project based in the United Kingdom opened an investigation into the mass execution.

On 21 September, a Taliban attack on an anti-Taliban base in Yakawlang district of Bamyan and Balkhab was repulsed by fighters under Mohammad Tahir Zahir with reports of four Taliban fighters wounded.

On 13 December, the NRF reported three commanders were captured by Taliban fighters due to one of their own fighters having links with the Taliban government.

On 26 December, NRF forces in Andarab repelled attacks from Taliban in Taghanak, Khej and Bagh Dara villages, with unconfirmed reports of casualties on both sides, which included NRF commander Khair Mohammad Andrabi. The NRF released statements to condemn Andarabi's death, who was killed while holding off a Taliban advance.

=== 2023 ===
On 25 January 2023, NRF forces attacked a Taliban camp in Kapisa, killing three fighters and wounding two with no casualties from the NRF.

On 30 January, a SIGAR quarterly report noted the presence of NRF-Taliban clashes in Badakhshan, Baghlan, Kapisa, Kunduz, Nangarhar, Nuristan, Panjshir, Parwan, Sar-e Pul, and Takhar, stating that the NRF had expanded their operations outside of the eastern and north-eastern regions, but the most significant clashes occurring in Panjshir, according to UNAMA. They also noted other anti-Taliban groups clashing with the Taliban, including the Afghanistan Liberation Movement in Kandahar, the Afghanistan Freedom Front in Kandahar and Zabul, and Watandost Front in Ghazni. They also state that according to UNAMA, 22 anti-Taliban groups claimed to operate in Afghanistan, but none control significant territory. As of yet, no anti-Taliban group are considered an existential threat to the Taliban.

On 23 February, a Taliban commander named Mullah Samiullah Mewand was killed in a mine explosion in the Sartepe Karte No district of Kabul. The Independent Persian reports that the mine was planted by NRF guerillas, and that Mewand was a senior commander who had arrested members of the NRF in Kabul.

On 28 February, the NRF raided Taliban headquarters in Takhar's Dashti Qala District.

On 15 March, locals in Baghlan reported 8 Taliban fighters killed by the NRF.

On 29 March, Sibghatullah Ahmadi announced that a new season is starting with fresh raids on Taliban forces. On the same day, Admadi also claimed that an attack was carried out by the NRF against a Taliban educational centre in the Pol-e Chakri area of Kabul, resulting in significant Special Taliban Unit casualties, although no concrete number was given.

On 10 April, armed clashes in the southern part of the Salang Valley in Parwan province left at least eight Afghanistan Freedom Front (AFF) members and between 5 and 30 Taliban fighters dead. Those killed included AFF commanders Akmal Amir, Nasir Ahmad Andarabi, and Fahim Salangi. Several members of AFF were also taken as prisoners by the Taliban forces. According to reports, the fighting began after the Taliban launched a major military operation against AFF and National Resistance Front (NRF) positions in the village of Henroh-Bala, in the Koklamy Valley of Salang District, Parwan Province. AFF Spokesperson said that the Taliban forces had tortured and disrespected bodies of some AFF members. The clashes began in the evening and continued into the early hours of 11 April. In response to the clashes, on 14 April, the Taliban detained 100 individuals in the district for suspected collaboration with anti-Taliban groups.

On 1 May, the NRF claimed its fighters killed two Taliban soldiers in an assault on a Taliban outpost in Parwan Province. The attack came two days after insurgents from the AFF killed two Taliban fighters and wounded another in an attack on a police station in Kabul.

On 7 May, the NRF claimed that its fighters had killed 8 Taliban fighters and injured 15 losing 4 NRF fighters in Khost district of Baghlan Province. The clashes came after the Taliban conducted house to house searches in the Jangalak village causing a skirmish to break out between NRF and Taliban forces lasting up to 10 hours. The NRF also confirmed that the Taliban were using heavy weapons and barrel bombs during the attacks.

On 4 June, the AFF conducted an attack in Baglan province, resulting in two Taliban deaths and four injuries.

On 4 July, the AFF announced the killing of a Taliban member and the injuring of three other members in Kapisa Province.

On 28 July, the NRF attacked Taliban positions in Kapisa province, resulting in three Taliban deaths caused by snipers, with unknown casualties due to rocket fire. The NRF had also announced it carried out attacks in Takhar, Badakhshan, Kapisa, Parwan, and Kabul provinces. This series of attacks represented a shift in strategy in the NRF and AFF from frontal attacks to guerilla attacks, including the use of weapons equipped with night-vision cameras to attack the Taliban. On 31 July, the NRF conducted another attack in the same area, resulting in further two Taliban deaths, with unknown NRF casualties.

On 5 August, the NRF claimed an attack on Taliban intelligence agents, killing four in Kabul and wounding one. In Takhar province, NRF fighters killed two Taliban fighters, including a local commander. On 14 August, NRF forces in Badakhshan province attacked a Taliban base at Sina village, Jurm district with three Taliban fighters killed and seizing their weapons and ammo.

On 16 August, NRF fighters in Takhar province killed two Taliban fighters and wounded two. On 17 August, locals in Badakhshan province reported the deaths of four NRF fighters, including a commander, during a gunfight with Taliban forces.

On 2 September, the NRF reported killing two Taliban fighters in Baghlan and Kapisa provinces. On 5 September, the NRF reported the death of Qamaruddin Andarabi, a senior commander in Andarab district, Baghlan by an alleged mole working for the Taliban. On 20 September, the AFF claimed to have killed a senior Taliban commander in Puli Khumri, along with four other Taliban members.

On 17 October, Munib Amiri survived an assassination attempt in Dushanbe, the capital of Tajikistan. An NRF member accompanying Amiri was injured in the attack.

The NRF and Afghanistan Freedom Front claimed to have killed at least 50 Taliban officials and soldiers during November. Analysts noted that the NRF lacked the strength to topple the Taliban at least for the near future, but appear to be creating political and governance challenges for the Taliban. Additionally, former Afghan military officials opened the office of Afghanistan United Front in the United States and Sami Sadat, a former Afghan general, asked for U.S. help during a hearing with the U.S. House of Representatives.

On 12 December, the Afghanistan Freedom Front claimed to have killed three Taliban fighters and wounded two others by attacking a Taliban outpost in Aybak city of Samangan province. The AFF had been increasing their attacks across Afghanistan in recent weeks.

As of December 2023, NRF leader Ahmad Massoud claimed that the NRF was conducting attacks against the Taliban in 20 out of Afghanistan's 34 provinces.

=== 2024 ===
On 11 January 2024, the Afghanistan Freedom Front claimed responsibility for an attack on a Taliban intelligence forces' convoy in Kabul's Khairkhana area, killing three Taliban and wounding another two. The Taliban convoy was allegedly targeting girls and detaining them in the Panjsad Family neighbourhood, something which the AFF condemned as the AFF pledged to stand up for women's rights in Afghanistan.

It was reported on 26 February that NRF fighters targeted Kabul International Airport, killing four Taliban fighters and wounding three others.

On 9 March, the NRF reported carrying out attacks against Taliban fighters in Parwan and Herat with four Taliban fighters killed, including the chief of staff of Bagram division.

On 5 April, the NRF claimed responsibility for an assault on a Taliban base in Takhar, which killed one Taliban fighter.

On 13 April, the AFF reported their fighters killed two Taliban fighters in Kabul.

On 17 April, it was reported that the Afghanistan Freedom Front had resumed guerrilla attacks on Taliban targets. The NRF also claimed responsibility for an attack on a vehicle in Kabul's fourth police district which killed three Taliban fighters.

On 27 April, the NRF reported that they killed two Taliban fighters in Herat.

On 18 May, the AFF attempted to assassinate Hibatullah Akhundzada, the Supreme Leader of Afghanistan, which failed to kill the Supreme Leader but did succeed in killing three members of the Taliban's special security guard unit and injuring another.

On 24 May, the NRF launched an attack in Herat, killing two Taliban fighters and injuring another.

On 8 June, more than 50 Shia figures from Afghanistan gathered in Europe and said that the Shia community must, if necessary, stand against the oppression of the Taliban, even through armed resistance.

On 21 June, the U.N. Assistance Mission in Afghanistan (UNAMA) published documentation of a surge in anti-Taliban attacks in Afghanistan, stating that NRF and AAF forces carried out 29 attacks, including 20 in Kabul, in the preceding three months. UNAMA stated that the attack count was a lower limit, since Taliban repression of the media made verification difficult. UNAMA judged that the attacks "did not pose a serious challenge" to Taliban rule. NRF spokesperson Ali Maisam Nazary stated that the NRF had carried out 160 "successful operations" in 2024.

On 1 September, in an interview with CNN, Massoud claimed that the NRF had more than 5,000 permanent forces scattered in some 20 provinces and had conducted 207 operations in the country since January. Massoud claimed that the Republican insurgency was a "fight for the soul and future of our nation, and we are determined to win, no matter the odds."

On 6 September, the NRF claimed that 13 Taliban fighters were killed with six wounded in operations conducted in Herat and Takhar.

On 12 September, the AFF claimed killing six Taliban fighters in Kabul and Balkh.

On 13 October, the AFF claimed killing three Taliban members in Kabul, including one intelligence official.

On 4 November, the Asia Times reported that the AFF had conducted 16 attacks across 7 provinces in a fortnight, and had even gone as far as attacking the Taliban's interior ministry in Kabul on October 18, killing four fighters. The Asia Times reported that the confidence of these anti-Taliban groups is rising. The AFF used the third anniversary of the Taliban’s return to call for better “unity, cohesion, and alignment” among all anti-Taliban groups, while veteran warlord Abdul Rashid Dostum has recently called a government in exile to overthrow the Taliban with the backing of the international community.

On 22 November, the FDD's Long War Journal reported that General Yasin Zia and the Afghan Freedom Front had been taking a more prominent role in anti-Taliban resistance. General Zia told the FDD in an interview that "“In 2025, we plan to place more political and military pressure on the Taliban...We’re fighting for equality, justice, and to return the power to the Afghan people.” Daoud Naji, head of the AFF's Political Committee, told LWJ "In the beginning, most of our attacks were on small checkpoints, but our operations are becoming more sophisticated because we’re attracting more former Afghan Security Force members.”

On 29 December, a major attack occurred, when the NRF attacked a convoy of the Afghan Ministry of Interior, killing 10 Taliban soldiers and destroying 3 vehicles. On 29 December, an explosion targeted the Taliban Ministry of Interior Affairs in Kabul, killing 10 Taliban fighters and wounding five more. The NRF claimed responsibility, and said that a Taliban commander was killed and three military vehicles destroyed. This came just after Pakistan launched airstrikes into Afghanistan, targeting the Pakistani Taliban (TTP), in retaliation for an attack in South Waziristan in Pakistan's Khyber Pakhtunkhwa province which reportedly killed 16 Pakistani soldiers. The airstrike led to a large escalation in the already violent Afghanistan–Pakistan border skirmishes. This led some to believe that Pakistan was supporting the NRF and other Afghan resistance groups as payback for the Afghan Taliban's support for the Pakistan Taliban.

By the end of year 2024, Institute for Conflict Management state that NRF had killed 444 Taliban fighters while losing 6 of its own fighters. During the same duration, AFF had killed 230 Taliban fighters while losing 3 of its own fighters.

=== 2025 ===
On 11 January 2025, Afghanistan International reported that Ali Maisam Nazary, the head of foreign relations of the National Resistance Front, called on Donald Trump and his administration to support their movement against terrorism. Further, the journal reported that Abbas Stanekzai, the deputy foreign minister of the Taliban, was seeking to establish a relationship with the US president.

On 24 February, Ahmad Massoud stated in an interview with the Hudson Institute that he wished for closer cooperation with the United States and Donald Trump to enable a free and democratic Afghanistan.

On 10 May, the AFF reportedly killed and wounded Taliban fighters in Kunduz and Panjshir.

On 17 May, the NRF said that they had killed 13 Taliban fighters and wounded four during an attack on a Taliban base in Dara district, which was confirmed by local residents. Following the attack, Taliban forces had detained at least twenty resident of Panjshir province. Taliban authorities did not comment publicly on the incident or the subsequent detentions, while the arrests raised concerns about collective punishment in the region.

On 16 August, the AFF reported that they killed 225 Taliban fighters after they carried out a total of 88 attacks since the beginning of 2025. They also reportedly carried out raids in Takhar and Kunduz provinces, killing and wounding seven Taliban fighters. The NRF carried out its own operation, raiding a Taliban checkpoint in Kunduz, killing two and wounding two Taliban fighters.

On 19 August, the Islamic Liberation Movement of the People of Afghanistan reported that its fighters killed Mawlawi Hassan in Herat.

On 22 September, NRF ambushed a Taliban's rapid reaction unit in Baghlan-e-Markazi district of Baghlan province killing commander of unit, Mullah Hebat Khan, and his three comrades.

During the border skirmishes between Pakistan and the Taliban in October 2025, the NRF released a statement in support of the Pakistani strikes against the Taliban. The NRF itself conducted an attack on 15 October, assassinating Qari Bashir, the deputy head of the Taliban's Propagation of Virtue and the Prevention of Vice in Kunduz.

On 29 November, Afghanistan Freedom Front said that its fighters had carried out attack on Taliban forces in Kunduz province, killing two Taliban members.

On 18 December, the United Nations Security Council (UNSC) stated in its report that, between January and July 2025, the National Resistance Front (NRF) carried out 73 attacks in Afghanistan, while the Afghanistan Freedom Front (AFF) carried out 43. The report said that the violence remained sporadic and did not pose a serious threat to Taliban rule. It also noted a sharp decline compared with 2024, when the AFF took responsibility for 83 attacks and the NRF for 261 attacks.

On 30 November, the Afghanistan Freedom Front (AFF) claimed that its fighters killed three Taliban members and wounded two more in a rocket attack in Badakhshan Province, Afghanistan.

The NRF claimed an attack on the Taliban's check post in Panjshir on 7 December 2025, killing 17 members of the group.

=== 2026 ===
On 1 January, Afghanistan Freedom Front attacked a Taliban court in Faryab province with rockets, killing 4 Taliban fighters and injuring 2 others.

On 3 January, the Afghanistan Freedom Front stated that two Taliban fighters were killed and two others were injured in an attack in Kunduz province. The group also said that it had set fire to the vehicle carrying the Taliban fighters.

On 7 January, Afghanistan Freedom Front attacked an intelligence outpost in Kabul province, killing 2 Taliban fighters and injuring another.

On 6 February, Afghanistan Freedom Front stated that they carried out attacks on Taliban military positions in Parwan and Kunduz provinces killing four Taliban fighters and injuring five others.

On 22 February, National Resistance Front stated that its fighters had ambushed a military vehicle belonging to Taliban forces near Kunduz Airport, killing three Taliban members and wounding two others.

On 14 February, Afghanistan Freedom Front said that two Taliban members were killed in an attack on a watchtower at the entrance to the border brigade of the Taliban’s 219th division stationed in Baharak district, Badakhshan province. Local sources confirmed that an explosion had occurred in the area and the Taliban forces had blocked roads leading to their base following the incident. The group later released a video of the attack and said that three Taliban fighters had also been injured in this attack.

On 11 March, National Resistance Front said that its fighters had carried out an attack in Kabul’s 15th police district, killing four Taliban fighters.

On 18 March, the National Resistance Front (NRF) announced that it had carried out 2,000 attacks against Taliban forces in Afghanistan over the past five years. The group also said that, during the same period, hundreds of its members had been detained by Taliban forces and that resistance to Taliban rule would continue.

In mid-March, Taliban authorities deployed Amanuddin Mansur, the governor of Helmand province, to Badakhshan Province. Mansur, a Taliban commander from Badakhshan, was appointed amid reports of opposition activity in northern Afghanistan. According to an Afghan media outlet, the deployment reflected Taliban concerns about the presence of opposition forces in the north and the possibility of increased regional or international support for them.

On 29 March, Afghanistan Freedom Front announced that they had carried out an attack on Taliban-led Afghan border unit in Baharak district of Badakhshan province, killing four Taliban members and injuring three others. The Freedom Front later released video of their attack on the border unit.

On 3 April, Afghanistan Freedom Front announced that they attacked a security checkpoint in the Sarai Shamali area of Kabul, killing 3 Taliban members and injuring 2 others.

On 9 April, the National Resistance Front (NRF) said that they had carried out a rocket attack on Taliban governor’s office in Faizabad, Badakhshan killing 2 Taliban members and injuring one other.

On 12 April, Afghanistan Freedom Front said that they attacked a military vehicle of Taliban forces in Alokhail area of Kabul, killing 2 Taliban members and injuring 2 others. The Freedom Front later released video of their attack and said that the attack was carried out on the third anniversary of the killing of its forces in Southern part of Salang valley, Parwan province.

On 13 April, Afghanistan Freedom Front stated that they attacked a government building belonging to Taliban authorities in Tala wa Barfak district of Baghlan province, killing 4 Taliban members and injuring 2 others. Yasin Zia, the leader of the Afghanistan Freedom Front, said that they will continue their attacks against the Taliban at any cost.

On 21 April, Afghanistan Freedom Front said that they attacked a security checkpoint belonging to Taliban forces in Pul-e-Alam, Logar province, killing 2 Taliban fighters and injuring 2 others. Afghanistan Freedom Front added that this marks the first operation carried out by its fighters in Logar province. An Afghan media outlet noted that Afghanistan Freedom Front has stepped up operations in recent months.

On 30 April, NRF fighters launched an attack in Kabul province, injuring 2 Taliban fighters.

On 1 May, Afghanistan Freedom Front attacked the Logar provincial headquarters, killing 2 Taliban fighters and injuring 2 others.

On 2 May, the NRF attacked Taliban forces in Baghlan province, killing 2 Taliban fighters and injuring another.

On 7 May, NRF fighters attacked Taliban fighters on the Farah-Rud highway in Farah province, killing 2 Taliban fighters.

On 17 May 2026, an announcement from the AFF was made that their fighters are engaged in commando-based operations in Badakhshan.

On 12 June 2026, AFF attacked officers of the Ministry for the Propagation of Virtue and Prevention of Vice in Herat, killing 3 officers and injuring another 2.

On 30 June 2026, AFF attacked a Taliban patrol vehicle in Kunduz, killing 2 Taliban and injuring another.

On 1 July 2026, Taliban claimed to have attacked Chitral, Pakistan, where they claimed Pakistan was hosting safe havens for opposition groups.

On 17 July, the newly-formed Homeland Corps Front (HCF), led by Qayyum Malang, briefly seized the district of Yaftali Sufla and disarmed the Taliban members present before giving the district up, kicking off an intensified insurgency in Badakhshan.

From 23 to 27 July 2026, the AFF clashed with Taliban forces in the Zebak district of Badakhshan, seizing their positions in the area and killing 21 Taliban and injuring another 37. 1 AFF fighter was killed. The group also managed to down two drones operated by the Taliban. Taliban confirmed the attacks and claimed that opposition fighters had travelled from Chitral, Pakistan to Badakhshan to launch attacks.

Attacks by resistance groups increased sharply in August, as the groups shifted their military strategy from guerrilla operations toward more conventional front-line fighting. Between 23 July and 22 August, the Afghan Freedom Front (AFF) carried out 21 attacks against Taliban forces across eight provinces, killing that 65 Taliban members were killed and 90 others wounded. On 1 August, Afghanistan United Front (AUF) announced the start of its military operation and deployed its fighters in Kandahar to face against fighters from the Taliban, al-Qaida, Islamic State and Tehrik-e-Taliban Pakistan (TTP). From 1 August to 20 August, AUF said that it carried out 20 attacks against the Taliban in Kandahar, Helmand, Badghis, Ghor, Faryab and several other parts of Afghanistan, killing dozens of Taliban fighters. National Resistance Front (NRF), from 29 July to 29 August, reported nine attacks against Taliban forces in Badakhshan, Kunduz, Herat and Baghlan, killing and wounding dozens of Taliban members. During the same month, NRF killed Taliban-appointed mayor of Faizabad, Abdul Rahman Mansour, along with his guards in Shahr-e Kohna area of Badakhshan province. A prominent NRF commander, Hasib Quwayi Markaz, was also killed in an ambush set up by Taliban forces in the Parwan province during the same month.

On 5 August, an anonymous Fatemiyoun Division commander reported that his soldiers were ready to face the Taliban.

On 11 August, following an increase in attacks by resistance groups in Badakhshan, the Taliban increased the number of its forces in the province. According to local sources, the Taliban also imposed strict curfew measures in parts of the province, restricting residents’ movement after 9 p.m.

From 22 to 27 August, the Afghanistan Freedom Front (AFF) reported that Taliban forces attacked its positions in Zebak district on 23 and 26 August. According to the AFF, its fighters successfully repelled both attacks, inflicting heavy casualties on Taliban forces. On 26 and 27 August, the Afghanistan Freedom Front (AFF) said its fighters carried out attacks against Taliban forces in Kunar and Kabul, respectively, killing one Taliban fighter and wounding two in Kunar, and killing three and wounding two in Kabul. During the same time period, Afghan United Front (AUF) reported two attacks on 22 and 26 August in Kandahar, killing five Taliban fighters and capturing their equipment.

On 11 September, AUF fighters were involved in an operation in Helmand. At the same time, NRF fighters attacked a Taliban checkpoint at Yaftal-e Payin district, Badakhshan.

On 27 September, the AFF conducted operations in Kamdesh, Nuristan. Taliban's Ministry of Defence stated that Pakistan sent fighters across the border from Chitral to Nuristan, of whom 28 were killed and 32 were arrested. These claims were rejected by Pakistan as "baseless".

On 30 September, NRF carried out an attack in Baghlan Province, in which 3 Taliban fighters killed and 2 injured. The same day, armed men killed a member of the Taliban's Ministry of Agriculture, Irrigation and Livestock; no group claimed responsibility.

On 1 October, AUF fighters killed one Taliban fighter at Siyori District, Zabul Province.

On 2 October, AUF fighters carried out operations in Helmand and Kandahar provinces, killing one Taliban fighter and injuring another.

On 3 October, NRF fighters attacked Taliban border guards in the Kuran wa Munjan district of Badakhsan province, killing one Taliban fighter and injuring 2 more. The AUF also carried out an attack in Lashkargah, Helmand province, killing one Taliban fighter. A Taliban police command based in Nuristan province requested reinforcements from the government because of the recent surge in anti-Taliban militancy.

On 4 October, NRF fighters carried out an operation in Fayzabad, Badakhshan province, killing a Taliban intelligence deputy and 2 of his bodyguards.

On 10 October, the NRF carried out an attack in Panjshir province, killing one Taliban fighter and injuring another.

On 12 October, NRF fighters carried out an attack in Baghlan province, killing one Taliban fighter. AUF also launched an attack in Ghor province, killing one Taliban fighter.

On 13 October, Afghanistan Freedom Front targeted Taliban intelligence officers in an attack in Logar province, killing 3 Taliban intelligence officers and injuring 2 more.

On 14 October, the AUF launched an attack in Kandahar province, killing 2 Taliban fighters. The Taliban also clashed with 2 armed men in Kandahar province who had opened fire on their fighters; both of the men were killed.

On 15 October, the AUF carried out operations in Helmand province, killing 5 Taliban fighters and an intelligence official.

On 17 October, AUF fighters attacked a Taliban outpost in Helmand province, killing one Taliban fighter and injuring 2 others.

On 23 October, NRF fighters targeted members of the Highway Police in Herat province, killing 2 Taliban fighters.

On 25 October, the AUF carried out operations in Kandahar, Ghazni, and Zabul provinces, killing 3 Taliban fighters. Afghanistan Freedom Front also attacked a vehicle being used by the Taliban in Kabul province, killing 2 Taliban fighters and injuring another.

On 26 October, AUF fighters carried out operations in Badakhshan, Ghazni, Ghor, Kandahar, Parwan, and Zabul provinces, killing 9 Taliban fighters and injuring 9 others.

On 27 October, the AUF carried out an attack in Zabul province, killing one Taliban fighter. Afghanistan Freedom Front also attacked a Taliban checkpoint in Kunar province, killing one Taliban fighter.

On 30 October, AUF fighters killed 2 Taliban police officers in Paktia province.

On 1 November, the AUF attacked a Taliban outpost in the Sartagab district of Sar-e-Pol province, killing one Taliban fighter and injuring 3 others.

On 2 November, AUF fighters killed a Taliban fighter in Kandahar province and seized his weapons.

On 4 November, the AUF carried out operations in Kandahar and Ghor provinces, killing two Taliban fighters.

On 5 November, AUF fighters carried out operations in Kandahar, Zabul, and Logar provinces, killing 3 Taliban fighters and injuring another.

On 6 November, the AUF killed a Taliban fighter in the Khak-e-Afghan district of Zabul province. The same day, a bodyguard assigned to protect Sirajuddin Haqqani was killed in Baghlan province.

On 7 November, members of the NRF killed 3 Taliban fighters in the Robat-e-Sangi district of Herat province. The AUF also killed a Taliban fighter in Kandahar province.

On 9 November, armed men killed a Taliban intelligence officer in Kabul; no group claimed responsibility. The same day, a Taliban official in charge of a security outpost in Logar province was killed.

On 10 November, the AUF executed two men who were spying for the Taliban in Ghor province. The same day, a commander belonging to an anti-Taliban militant group was arrested in Maidan Wardak province.

On 11 November, AUF fighters carried out operations in Ghor, Ghazni, Juzjan, and Sar-e-Pol provinces, killing 3 Taliban police officers and an intelligence official. The group also attacked a police outpost in Kabul but no casualties were confirmed.

On 12 November, Afghanistan Freedom Front carried out an attack in Kabul province, killing one Taliban fighter.

On 13 November, Afghanistan Freedom Front attacked a Taliban outpost in Kapisa province with heavy weapons, killing 3 Taliban fighters and injuring 4 others.

On 17 November, the AUF carried out attacks in Kabul and Kandahar provinces, killing one Taliban fighter, a counterintelligence official, and his two bodyguards.

On 19 November, Afghanistan Freedom Front attacked a Taliban checkpoint in the Dara-I-Pech district of Kunar province, killing one Taliban fighter and injuring 2 others.

== Foreign involvement ==
=== Neutral ===
As of 23 August 2021, there was no public support for the resistance from the international community. At the start of the conflict, the US and other potential allies were focused on the concurrent Kabul airlift, which required the Taliban's cooperation. Massoud's op-ed in The Washington Post requesting Western support may be evidence of a lack of enthusiasm (for the resistance) in the US government.

On 21 August 2021, former Indian Chief of the Army Staff Shankar Roychowdhury said that the Government of India must reach out to Panjshir-based resistance forces alongside Taliban factions that may be friendly to India.

=== Pro-Resistance ===
On 25 August 2021, Bilal Y. Saab, an ex-Pentagon senior advisor, and Mick Mulroy, former Deputy Assistant Secretary of Defense for the Middle East, Marine veteran and ex-CIA Special Activities Center operator, argued in a Time editorial that Washington, D.C. should provide support in Afghanistan by allowing the CIA to station its officers with counterterrorism responsibilities to secretly assist anti-Taliban resistance groups. U.S. senator Lindsey Graham and representative Michael Waltz advocated for giving NRF support so that they can hold their ground against the Taliban after they captured Kabul. In an interview on 2 September 2021, Erika Simpson, president of the Canadian Peace Research Association, said that it was potentially risky for a country to publicly support the resistance from inside Afghanistan and suggested that it was better to support anti-Taliban resistance groups based overseas.

On 27 August 2021, Tajiks from Kulob, Tajikistan volunteered to prepare to fight against the Taliban, despite warnings from Tajik officials that it can be deemed illegal. Tajikistan has allowed NRF to maintain a political presence in Dushanbe and has hosted several senior Afghan opposition figures since the collapse of the former Afghan government in August 2021. Tajik President Emomali Rahmon has criticized the Taliban’s policies in relation to Afghanistan’s Tajik minority, prompting Taliban officials to accuse Tajikistan of interfering in Afghanistan’s internal affairs. Tajik officials have denied Taliban claims that NRF leader Ahmad Massoud and former Vice President Amrullah Saleh are based in Tajikistan, although other resistance figures, including Abdul Latif Pedram, have reportedly resided in Dushanbe. Rising tensions have also been accompanied by military exercises and parades along the Tajik-Afghan border. Since 2025, Dushanbe has scaled back some of their support to opposition groups due to the lack of unity among them and regional dynamics, including Russia recognizing the Taliban as the de facto government.

On 6 September 2021, Iran's Foreign Ministry spokesman Saeed Khatibzadeh strongly condemned the Taliban assault on the Panjshir Valley. On 10 September, a road named Panjshir Alley in Tehran was officially named and approved by the Tehran City Council.

In mid-September 2021, in a move aimed at increasing inclusivity in the Taliban government, 20 European Parliament members filed a motion to invite NRF leader Ahmad Massoud to address the European Council and the EP, just as his father did 20 years earlier. The Spectator noted in a May 2024 interview with NRF leader Ahmad Massoud that the NRF runs a significant lobbying operation, with an office in Washington DC, and that it had friendly senators such as U.S. Senator Lindsey Graham supporting its cause.

Mohammad Mohaqiq, leader of the People's Islamic Unity Party of Afghanistan, said at a memorial ceremony for Freedom Front commanders that only one country is backing armed resistance against the Taliban. Although he did not name the country, his remarks appeared to refer to Pakistan, which has recently been involved in military tensions with the Taliban. He said that, for the past four and a half years, the conditions for an armed struggle had not been in place because Western countries and Afghanistan’s neighbors had stood in the way. Mohaqiq also said that attention toward the Taliban’s opponents has recently grown. New Lines, an American magazine, reported, citing multiple sources, that Pakistan has resumed political contacts with Afghan figures opposed to the Taliban, raising speculation that Islamabad may be considering a regime change in Afghanistan. As per the magazine, Pakistan actions were driven by concerns over the Taliban’s growing ties with India, the failure of peace talks in Istanbul, and increased activity by the Tehreek-e-Taliban Pakistan (TTP). The magazine also adds that before the collapse of the Ashraf Ghani government in 2021, then-Inter-Services Intelligence (ISI) chief Faiz Hameed secretly met National Resistance Front (NRF) leader Ahmad Massoud in a Gulf country to discuss the possibility of forming an inclusive Afghan government. The magazine further reported that Pakistan possesses the military and intelligence capabilities to target Taliban leaders and influence the political balance in Afghanistan, but is concerned about the potential fallout that could create a power vacuum and trigger another refugee crisis. The magazine also stated that Pakistan hosted several several Afghan opposition figures in October 2025.

In September 2025, Pakistan hosted a meeting of several exiled Afghan political figures, including politicians opposed to Taliban rule. The meeting was rescheduled three times following objections from the Taliban-led Afghan government. Participants called for the use of political, military, and civil tools to establish an inclusive political system in Afghanistan. A second round of meeting of exiled Afghan politicians was organised by Pakistan and Women for Afghanistan in London on 24-25 March 2026. The meeting concluded with Afghan opposition figures calling for an inclusive political system based on the people’s will and greater unity among opposition groups. The participants of the meeting also met directly with international partners, including diplomats, ambassadors, and members of the UK House of Commons and House of Lords. On 6 August 2026, several exiled Afghan politicians visited Islamabad for talks with senior Pakistani military and security officials on Afghanistan’s political and security situation. Discussions focused on relations with and coordination among anti-Taliban groups, as well as threats from ISKP, al-Qaeda and the TTP. The meeting concluded with calls for greater coordination among groups opposed to the Taliban. Pakistan's Ministry of Foreign Affairs, however, did not comment on the reported meeting between Afghan and Pakistani officials.

Since the 2026 Afghanistan–Pakistan war, the Taliban has accused Pakistan of supporting anti-Taliban resistance groups. The Taliban has accused Pakistan of providing safe havens to resistance forces in the Chitral region of northern Pakistan.

=== Pro-Taliban ===
United Nations Analytical Support and Sanctions Monitoring Team stated that both, Al-Qaeda and Jamaat Ansarullah, have participated in joint operations with Taliban against anti-Taliban resistance front in Faizabad district of Badakhshan province. Fighters from Jamaat Ansarullah and Al-Qaeda were deployed along with a suicide bomber unit from the Lashkar-e Mansouri Martyrdom Battalion during the joint operation. Taliban officials have also sought assistance from Jamaat Ansarullah in fighting National Resistance Front (NRF) in Arghanj Khwa District of Badakhshan province. According to reports, several members of Jamaat Ansarullah were killed in clashes with NRF in Badakhshan province.

== Analysis ==
Shortly after the fall of Kabul, journalists Carlotta Gall and Adam Nossiter wrote in The New York Times that the international community would be in a bind if they showed some form of support for the resistance because of the airlift operations that were then ongoing. Abdul Matin Beyk suggested that other anti-Taliban forces were waiting to see if the Panjshir-based fighters would either resist to the end or keep considering negotiations with Taliban representatives. He suggested that their successes could inspire others to do the same.

Analysts Bill Roggio and Andrew Tobin speculated that the eventual success of the Taliban offensive against the Panjshir Valley in early September 2021 might have been related to the previous attempts of the NRF to expand into neighbouring districts. Accordingly, the NRF would have been overextended and had not prepared its defences well enough.

The Institute for the Study of War assessed that the NRF controlled at least five villages in Tagab District, Badakhshan Province for a few days in June 2022, and a valley in Khost wa Fereng District, Baghlan Province for less than one month in July 2022. On 17 November 2022, FDD's Long War Journal assessed that the NRF controlled a small number of bases, villages, and valleys across eight districts in northeastern Afghanistan. On 29 November 2022, the Institute for the Study of War assessed that the NRF conducted defensive maneuvers in several areas of northeastern Afghanistan. As of 15 August 2023, FDD's Long War Journal assesses that the NRF and allies conduct guerilla operations but do not control territory.

By 22 May 2024, FDD's Long War Journal assessed that the NRF and its allies had gained in strength since their inception but did not yet pose a threat to the Taliban's rule. The Regional Anti-Terrorist Structure of the Shanghai Cooperation Organization stated on 28 May 2024 that the AFF and NRF were increasing their cooperation, such as coordinating anti-Taliban attacks in Kabul, and expected the AFF and NRF to conduct their first joint military operations in mid 2024. The report stated that while the NRF and AFF were still too weak to hold territory, the Taliban are incapable of preventing guerilla attacks and are unable to retaliate against the resistance. The report concludes by arguing that the early 2024 activities of the resistance fighters had already made the Taliban commanders and influential functionaries afraid to move around the city at night, due to the ability of urban guerrilla groups to conduct targeted operations, and that the NRF's intelligence wing had managed to infiltrate and seize significant sensitive data of both the Taliban leadership and its governmental departments.

According to the Hudson Institute in August 2024, the NRF's objective was to continue to hold onto its presence in Panjshir, where the resistance continued to control much of the mountainous terrain of the province, and grow its grassroots armed resistance across the whole of Afghanistan. In the longer term, the resistance's goal would be to control some districts outside Panjshir, ultimately building toward a larger base of operations to use against the Taliban similar to the Northern Alliance in the 1990s. The Hudson Institute analysis found that the NRF was also actively working to discourage international recognition of the Taliban as the legitimate government of Afghanistan, while pushing themselves as a credible alternative. The article found that Massoud was promoting ethnic diversity amongst the resistance, because while the NRF is largely ethnically Tajik, it had been increasing its representation of Uzbeks and Hazaras in its conferences with like-minded groups. The article stated that the Taliban possessed far greater manpower and equipment due to the NRF's lack of international backing, and urged American support towards the NRF.

As of November 2025, the Republican resistance has struggled to garner political support from Western countries. However, due to deteriorating Afghanistan–Pakistan relations following the 2025 Afghanistan–Pakistan conflict, Islamabad has opened channels of dialogue with opposition representatives and is exploring the possibility of supporting the Republican opposition. While Pakistani support would make many resistance members uncomfortable due to Pakistan's past support for the Taliban, it is believed that potential Pakistani support for the opposition could play a critical role in the resistance's chances.

According to former CIA intelligence officer Sarah Adams, Taliban reliance on independent and foreign Islamist troops to combat the insurgency in Badakhshan, as well as its failures to recruit sufficient fighters from its traditional heartland in the Pashtun south, highlights the gravity of the situation in Badakhshan and the nature of the relationship between the Taliban and international militant organizations.

BBC Monitoring mentioned on August 11, 2026, that most of the resistance lack coordination efforts among themselves, which is acknowledged by Hamid Saifi after the establishment of the Freedom and Justice Movement (FJM).

== See also ==
- War in Afghanistan (2001–2021)
- 2021 Taliban offensive
- 2021–2022 Afghan protests
- 2021 anti-Pakistan protests
- Battle of Zebak (2026)
- Balkhab uprising
