= Fasihuddin Fitrat =

Army Chief of Afghanistan since 2021

Mullah Fasihuddin Fitrat فصیح‌الدین فطرت
- Fitrat in 2025

Chief of General Staff
- Incumbent
- Assumed office 7 September 2021
- Supreme Leader: Hibatullah Akhundzada
- Prime Minister: Hasan Akhund
- Defence Minister: Mullah Yaqoob
- Preceded by: Hebatullah Alizai

Personal details
- Born: Muhammad Fasihuddin Fitrat Istirab, Warduj District, Badakhshan Province, Afghanistan
- Ethnicity: Tajik
- Nickname: Fatih-i Shumal ("Conqueror of the North")

Military service
- Allegiance: Islamic Emirate of Afghanistan
- Branch/service: Military Affairs Commission (until 2021); Islamic National Army (from 2021)
- Rank: General
- Commands: Military Affairs Commission of Badakhshan Province (until 2021); Afghan Armed Forces (2021–present)
- Battles/wars: War in Afghanistan; Taliban insurgency; Operation Moshtarak; 2021 Taliban offensive; Fall of Kabul; Republican insurgency; Balkhab uprising; Battle of Zebak (2026); Islamic State–Taliban conflict; Afghanistan–Tajikistan border skirmishes; 2026 Afghanistan–Pakistan war

Muhammad Fasihuddin Fitrat (Dari: محمد فصیح‌الدین فطرت, romanized: Muḥammad Faṣīḥuddīn Fiṭrat) is an Afghan politician and military leader who is serving as the chief of general staff of the Afghan Armed Forces since 2021. An ethnic Tajik, he is one of the seniormost members of the Taliban.

in Istirab, Warduj District, Fitrat completed his education at a madrasa in Yamgan District. He joined the Taliban in the late 1990s and played a prominent role in toppling Northern Alliance strongholds. After the United States invasion of Afghanistan ousted the Taliban's Islamic Emirate, Fitrat moved to Karachi for some while before returning to northern Afghanistan. In 2013, during the Taliban insurgency, he was appointed the shadow governor of Badakhshan Province and rose to ranks within the Taliban.

During the 2021 Taliban insurgency, Fitrat led Taliban forces from the northern Tajik-dominated regions of Afghanistan. He seized the Panjshir Province from the National Resistance Front (NRF) in September 2021, after which the Taliban gained control over whole of Afghanistan. As such, he became known as Fatih-i Shumal ("Conqueror of the North") among the Taiban. In 2022, Fitrat suppressed the Balkhab revolt led by Afghan Hazara rebel leader Mahdi Mujahid. Fitrat has also led Taliban's operations against ISIS Khorasan (ISIS-K).

== Early life and education ==
Fasihuddin Fitrat was born in the town of Istirab, Warduj District, Badakhshan Province. He belongs to the Dari-speaking ethnic Tajik Sunni Muslim family. His father Mawlawi Saifuddin was an Islamic scholar and served as an imam in Warduj.

Fitrat completed his education at a madrasa in Yamgan District in the 1990s and subsequently worked as a primary school teacher there.

== Military career ==
Fasihuddin joined the Taliban in the late 1990s after moving to Karachi to study the Islamic sciences.

Following the Taliban’s fall from power in Afghanistan in 2001 after seizing control of Kabul in 1996, the movement created a de-facto governmental order that placed Taliban members—shadow officials—in control of specific areas within Afghanistan. At one point, Fasihuddin was the shadow governor of Badakhshan. It was because of Fitrat that the entire Northern Alliance was toppled despite the fact that the Haqqani network, Abdul Ghani Baradar and Hibatullah Akhundzada were from Pashtun-dominated areas, where they faced a lot of resistance. He is known as the "Conqueror of the North" (Fatih-i Shumal in Dari) among the Taliban.

In 2013, Fitrat was appointed as the Taliban's shadow governor and head of the military commission in Badakhshan. In the same year, he first appeared in a Taliban propaganda video about the security situation in Badakhshan. In 2015, the Afghan Ministry of Interior falsely claimed that Fitrat had been killed with 40 of his men, but the claim turned out to be inaccurate.

Fitrat was the first Taliban leader to enter Panjshir Province. He alongside his Taliban soldiers took control of Bazarak and thus took control of Panjshir.

Fitrat was also involved in suppressing the Balkhab uprising led by the Shia Hazara militant Mahdi Mujahid. Fitrat has also led Taliban operations against ISIS Khorasan.

== Sources ==
- Ali, Obaid (3 January 2017). "The Non-Pashtun Taleban of the North (1): A case study from Badakhshan".
- Foschini, Fabrizio (September 2024). RULING UNCHARTED TERRITORY:Islamic Emirate governance in northeastern Afghanistan (PDF) (Report).
- "Qari Fasihuddin". Counter Extremism Project. 2021.
- Khan, Siraj (2021). "Qari Fasihuddin, the conqueror of the Five Lions". Samaa.
- Sayed, Abdul (5 September 2021). "Analysis: How Are the Taliban Organized?". Voice of America.
- Fazl-e-Haider, Syed (9 July 2023). "Qari Fasihuddin Fitrat: The Afghan Taliban's Tajik "Commander of the North" - Jamestown". Jamestown Foundation.

Military offices
Preceded by Hebatullah Alizai	Chief of General Staff; 2021–present	Incumbent
