= Kārte Naw =

Karte Naw کارته نو
- Neighborhood of Kabul
- Country: Afghanistan
- Province: Kabul

Karte Naw (Dari: کارته نو; New Quarter), historically known as Sayed Noor Muhammad Shah Maina (Pashto: سید نور محمدشاه مینه), is a neighborhood in Kabul, Afghanistan. It is within the 8th District of the city, to the east of Chaman-e-Hozori.

== History ==
Karte Naw was initially developed in the 1950s as an eastern urban expansion from Shah Shahid.

The area was once one of Kabul's most prosperous. However, it became a main arena of battle between Mujahideen groups in the 1990s.

== Postal code ==
The area's government postal code is 1005.
