= Waghaz District =

Waghaz واغظ
- District
- Location within Afghanistan
- Coordinates: 33°25′N 68°13′E
- Country: Afghanistan
- Province: Ghazni
- Elevation: 2,350 m (7,710 ft)

Population (2009)
  - Total: 27,900

Waghaz (Pashto: واغظ) is a district in Ghazni province, Afghanistan. It was formed in 2005 from part of Muqur District, and has a population estimated at 27,900.

== Education ==
The Rana Kheil boys and girls school was renovated in 2003. Funding was provided by the School of Hope for the rehabilitation of the school building.

== See also ==
- Districts of Afghanistan
- Ghazni Province

== Gallery ==
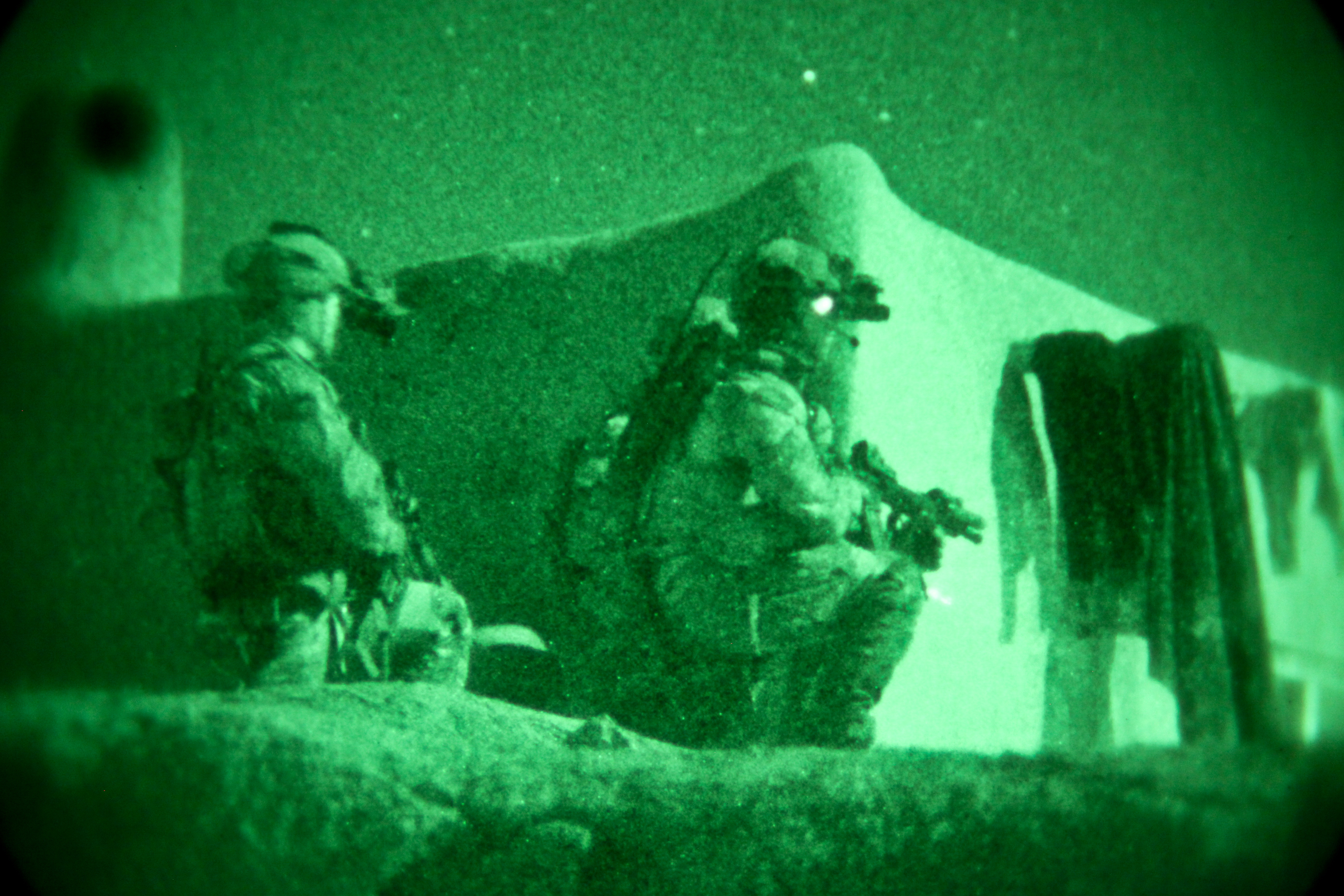
Coalition security force members provide security during an operation in March 2013.
