= Ajai Sahni =

Indian counter-terrorist expert

Ajai Sahni is an author on counter-terrorism, a founding member and as of 2023, executive director of the Institute for Conflict Management in New Delhi, which maintains the South Asia Terrorism Portal, a website that provides comprehensive information on terrorism, low-intensity warfare, and sectarian strife in South Asia, including India, Pakistan, Afghanistan, Bangladesh, Bhutan, Nepal, and Sri Lanka.

== Background ==
Sahni earned his PhD at the University of Delhi, where his dissertation was titled Democracy, Dissent & the Right to Information.

In 2006, Ajai Sahni submitted written evidence to the UK House of Commons, Select Committee on Foreign Affairs regarding Islamic terrorism in South Asia which is available on the House of Commons' website.

In February 2009, Emma Nicholson, Baroness Nicholson of Winterbourne, included Sahni in a panel of leading experts debating how to combat global terrorism with UK Parliamentarians.

Sahni also edits 'South Asia Intelligence Review' and 'Faultlines'.

== Political position ==
After the 2008 Mumbai attacks, Sahni criticized the Indian government. Madhur Singh, writing in Time, quoted Sahni "We have such an incoherent and incapable leadership, and across all political parties. While Prime Minister Manmohan Singh seems to understand the scale of the challenge, he doesn't seem to carry the weight with his own Cabinet colleagues. And the irrational opposition has been blocking all forward-looking steps, irrespective of national interest."
