= Daoud Naji =

Afghan politician and journalist (born 1973)

- داوود ناجی
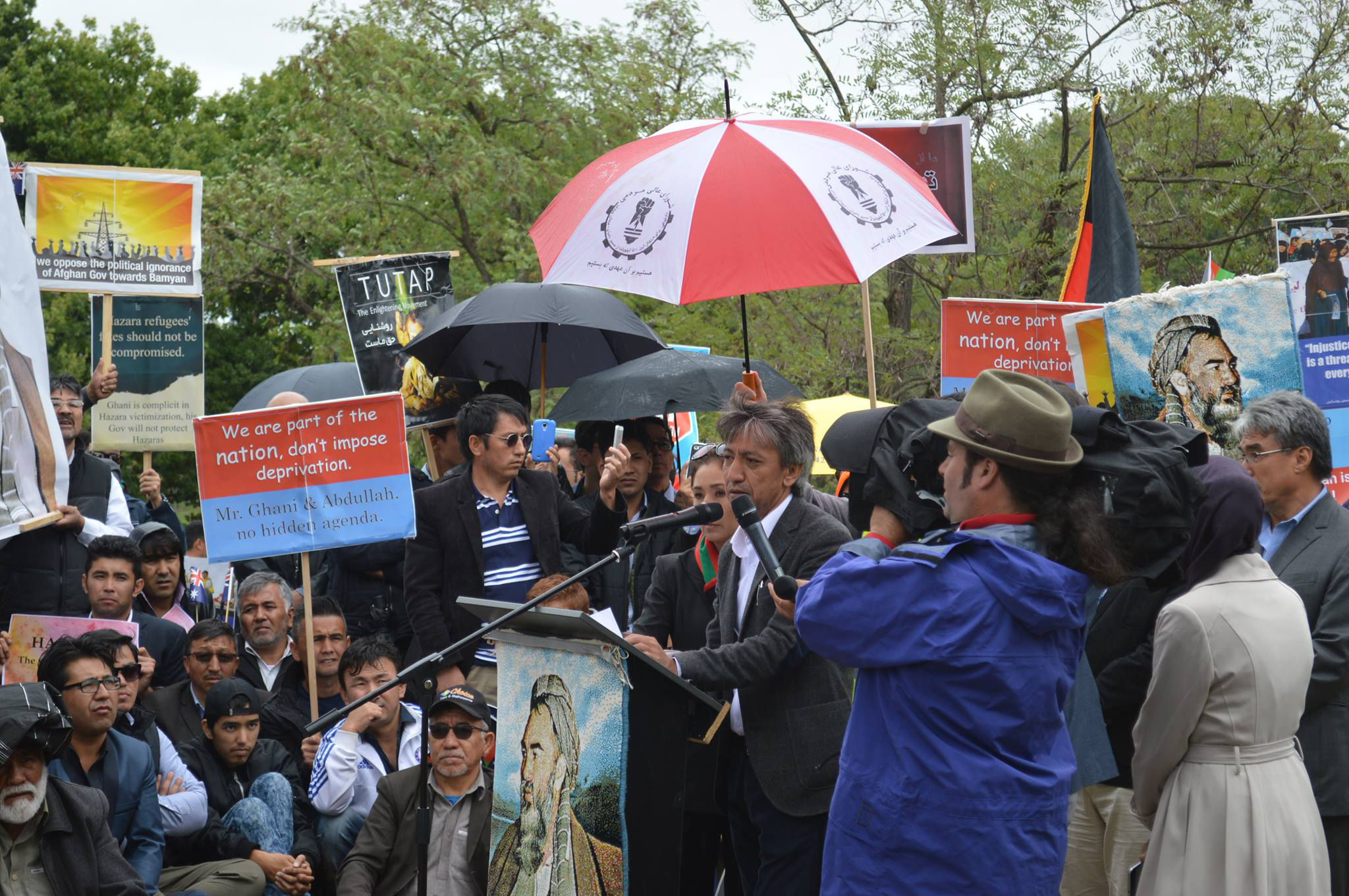

Personal details
- Born: 17 June 1973 (age 53) Malistan, Ghazni, Kingdom of Afghanistan
- Education: Balkh University
- Ethnicity: Hazara

Daoud Naji (Note: Dari: داوود ناجی) (born 17 June 1973) is an Afghan politician and journalist who currently serves as the head of the political committee of the Afghanistan Freedom Front (AFF) since September 2024.

An ethnic Hazara, he served as senior political adviser to the Afghan National Security Council under the former government of the Islamic Republic of Afghanistan. Before he joined the government, he was a senior leader of the Enlightenment Movement of Afghanistan and the Tabassum movement. Naji has previously been a BBC Radio journalist and worked for BBC World Service for 14 years, and as of September 2024, he serves as the head of the political committee of the Afghanistan Freedom Front.

== Early life and education ==
Daoud Naji was born on 17 June 1973 in Malistan, Ghazni province. He has a bachelor's degree in Persian language and literature from the Faculty of Language and Literature at Balkh University. When the Taliban came to power, he left Mazar-e-Sharif and went to Jaghori, Ghazni province, where he worked as a teacher.

In year 2000 he immigrated to Quetta, Pakistan and established the Albironi elementary School for refugees, which later became a high school.

== Career ==
In 2002, he began working with BBC Persian as a local reporter in Helmand and Kandahar. In 2006, he moved to London to continue his job as a senior producer in BBC Persian. In 2009, he became the new Editor-in-Chief of BBC Persian online, the most visited website in Afghanistan, Tajikistan and Iran, for Persian speakers around the world. During 2011 and 2012, he began training online for Afghan journalists in a joint project with the support of the BBC and media action. In 2014, he started writing for the daily Etilaat-e-Roz. Currently, he is a member of the editor's board of daily Etilaat-e-Roz. Daoud Naji has participated in several international conferences as a reporter.
