= Balkhab =

Balkhab بلخاب
- Village
- Location in Afghanistan
- Coordinates: 35°30′N 66°30′E
- Country: Afghanistan
- Province: Sar-e Pol Province
- District: Balkhab District
- Time zone: + 4.30

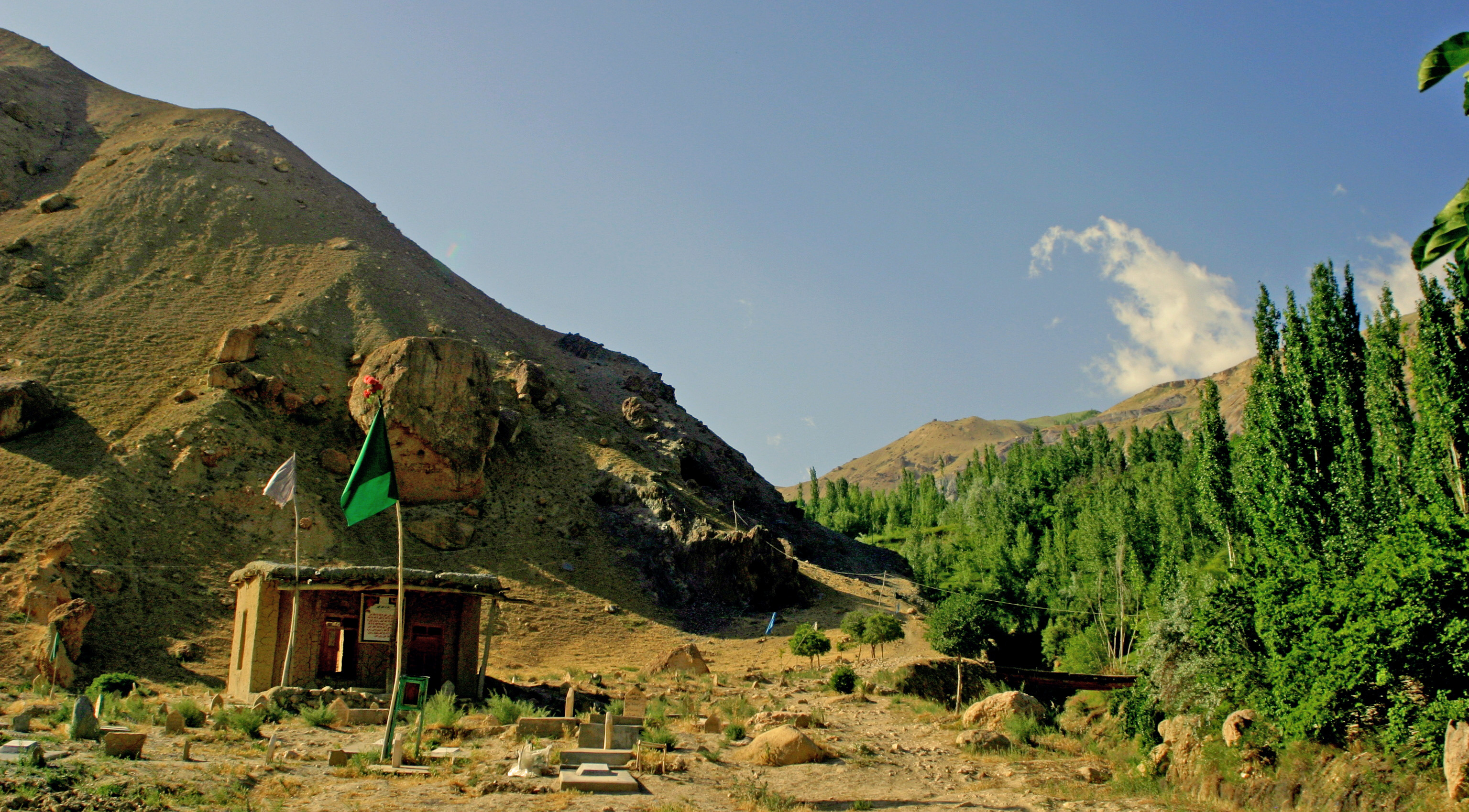
Cemetery located in Torkhouj

Balkhab, also known as Tarkhoj, is a village and district capital of Balkhab District in Sar-e Pol Province, in northern Afghanistan.

== See also ==
- Balkhab District
- Balkhab River
- Balkhab uprising
- Sar-e Pol Province
