= Balkhab District =

Balkhab بلخاب
- District
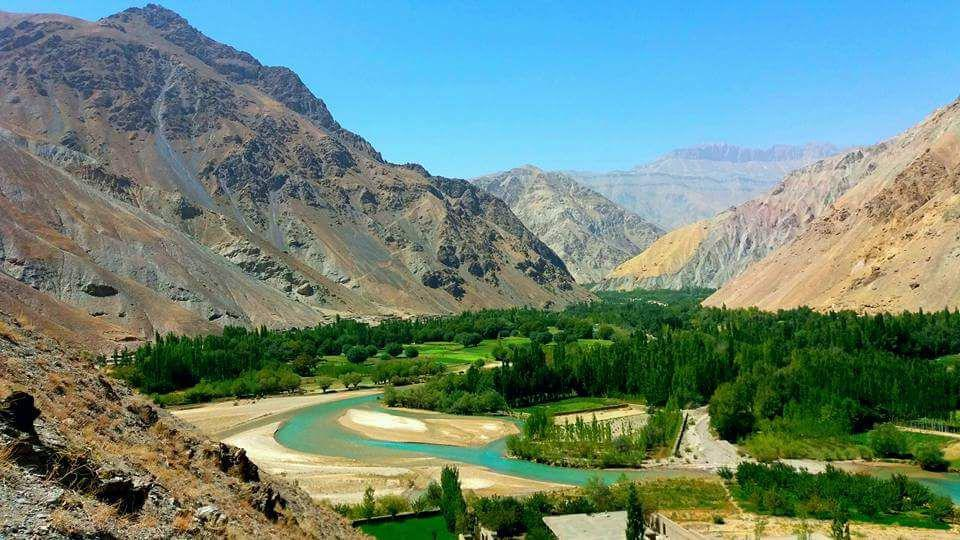

- Location in Afghanistan
- Coordinates: 36°13′17″N 65°55′40″E
- Country: Afghanistan
- Province: Sar-e Pol
- Capital: Balkhab
- Elevation: 2,080 m (6,820 ft)

Population
  - Ethnicities: Hazaras Tajiks and Uzbeks
- Time zone: UTC+4:30
- Main languages: Dari-Persian and Uzbeki

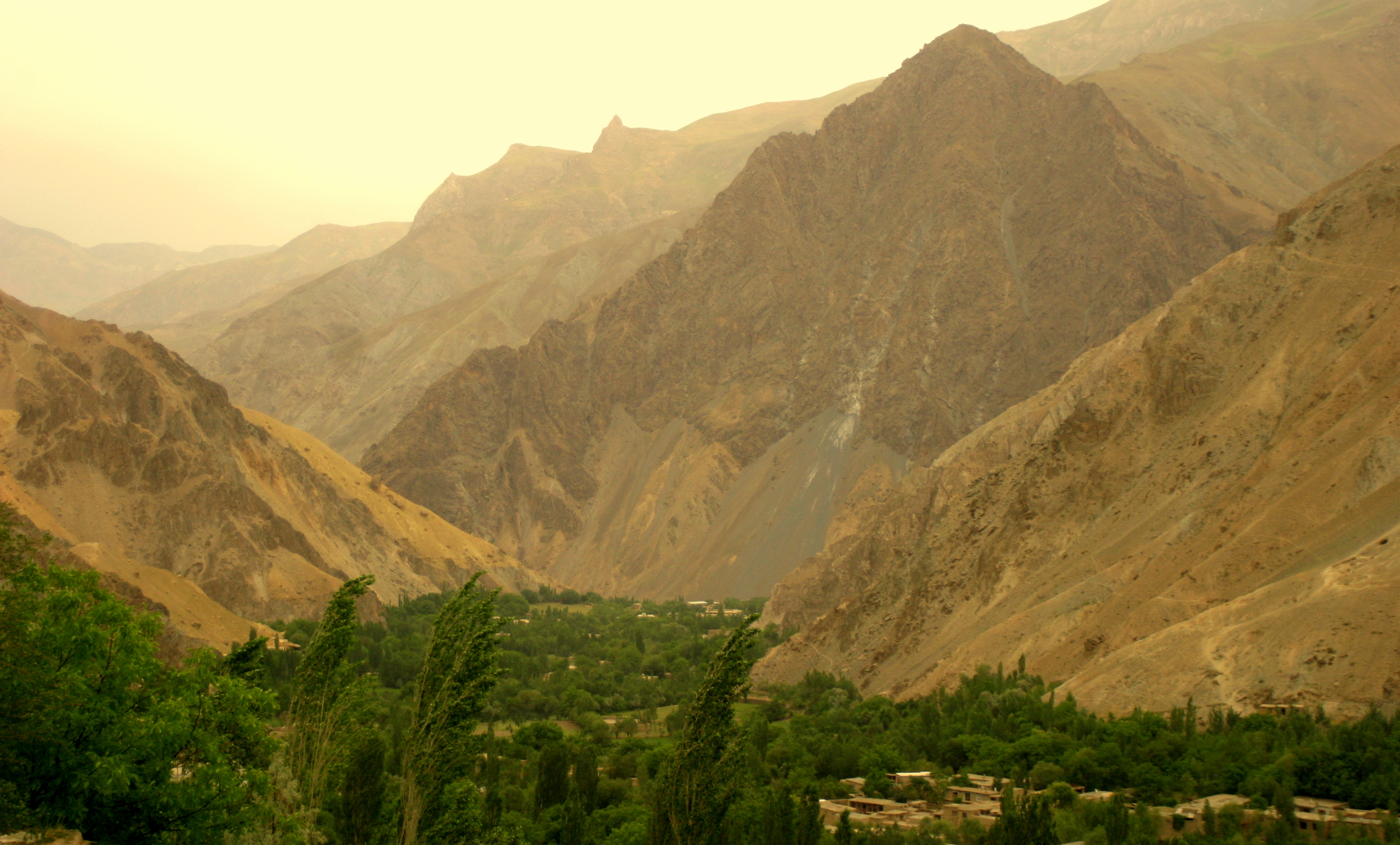

Balkhab (Dari: بلخاب) is a district of Sar-e Pol Province, Afghanistan. The district seat lies at Balkhab, also known as Tarkhoj.

Coal is mined in the area. A massive copper deposit is also located in Balkhab district of Sar-e pol province, the new copper discovery is bigger than the current Aynak copper deposit in Logar province, southeast of Kabul, according to a GSA report. It is valued at billions of U.S. dollars and one of the biggest untapped copper mines in Afghanistan. The discovery appears to be a volcano genetic massive sulfide deposit—a deposit type which could supply much of the world's gold, copper, lead and zinc. On October 5, 2018, in Washington, D.C., Afghan officials signed a 30-year contract for a copper mining project involving a $56 million investment by investment group Centar and its operating company, Afghan Gold and Minerals Co., for exploration of an area covering 500 square km, with development of mining due to begin thereafter.

The entire Balkhab district was briefly controlled by Mehdi Mujahid during 2022, before the Taliban retook it.

== See also ==
- Balkhab
- Balkhab River
- Balkhab uprising
- Districts of Afghanistan
