= Shahab al-Muhajir =

Leader of Islamic State – Khorasan Province

- شهاب المهاجر
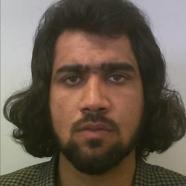

7th Wali of ISIS – Khorasan Province
- Incumbent
- Assumed office 5 April 2020
- Preceded by: Mawlawi Aslam Farooqi

Personal details
- Born: Sanaullah Ghafari; October 28, 1994 (age 32) Kabul, Islamic State of Afghanistan

Military service
- Allegiance: ISIS– Khorasan Province
- Battles/wars: War on terror; War in Afghanistan; Islamic State–Taliban conflict; Balkhab conflict

Sanaullah Ghafari (Note: Pashto: ثناءالله غفاری) (born 28 October 1994), better known under his nom de guerre Shahab al-Muhajir, (Note: Pashto: شهاب المهاجر) is an Afghan militant who is serving as the 7th Wali of the Islamic State's Khorasan Province (IS–K) since 2020.

== Early life ==
Sanaullah Ghafari was born on 28 October 1994, to a Pashtun family of merchants near the Shakardara district of Kabul. His father, Abdul Jabbar Khan, reportedly fought for the Hezb-e Islami Gulbuddin under Gulbuddin Hekmatyar. His surname comes from the name of his paternal grandfather, Abdul Ghafar Khan.

There are differing accounts of his ancestry. Sputnik reports that he belongs to the Kharoti tribe. Other sources claim that his family allegedly migrated from India to Afghanistan. The Independent Persian reports that his family lives in Pakistan.

He received religious education from the Ghaffari Madrassa in Kabul, and obtained an engineering degree at Kabul University. Ghafari joined the Afghan Army and served as a soldier.

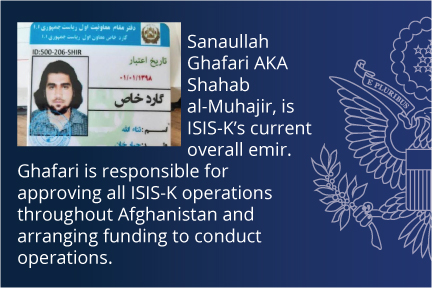
Advisory published by the State Department showing Ghafari's purported identity card from the Afghan Presidential Protective Service

In an identity document reportedly issued in January 2018 by the Afghan Presidential Protective Service and published by the State Department, Ghafari is presented as a body guard of former prime ministers Abdul Rashid Dostum and Amrullah Saleh and had his service pistol listed as an MP-446 Viking pistol. An officer working for Dostum's cabinet claimed that the document was falsified.

The Independent Persian published a document showing that Ghafari was issued a businessman weapon's license in March 2016 by the Afghan Interior Ministry. The document stated that he worked as an associate for the "Shafiqullah and Ruhollah Limited Trading Company", with a source telling The Independent that Ghafari's family owned a trading company between Afghanistan and Pakistan. Al Arabiya reports that Ghafari married the daughter of Engineer Shakoor, an ISIS–K leader, through the meditation of Mullah Taj Muhammad.

On December 22, 2021, the Council of the European Union, following the United Nations, added al-Muhajir to its sanctions list.

December 21, 2021 ISIL (Da'esh) and Al-Qaida Sanctions Committee added Al-Muhajir (under one of his aliases, Sanaullah Ghafari) to the sanctions list.

February 8 United States Department of State A reward of up to ten million dollars was announced for information leading to the identification or location of Sanaullah Ghafari, the leader of ISIS in Afghanistan, or for information regarding the arrest of those responsible for the attack at Kabul airport in August 2021.

Sanaullah Ghafari has particularly close ties to the leader of ISIS.

== Militant career ==
Former prime minister Amrullah Saleh claimed that he reportedly joined the Haqqani network between 2010 and 2012, and became a mid-level operative until his defection to ISIS Central in 2015. The Taliban denies that Ghafari was a member of the Haqqani network.

Ghafari served for ISIS Central during the wars in Iraq and Syria. A Taliban intelligence source told al-Jazeera that he led a commando of 35 Afghans within ISIS after having pledged allegiance to Abu Bakr al-Baghdadi.

In April 2020, Ghafari was named emir and head of operations of ISIS–K, reportedly the first emir of ISIS–K who is not Afghan or Pakistani.

After the 2021 Kabul airport attack masterminded by Ghafari, the Taliban announced that they would take every possible measure to capture him. The Taliban's General Directorate of Intelligence (GDI) published a wanted poster for three ISIS–K members which included a photo of Ghafari.

Added to the Russian List of organizations designated as terrorist or extremist by Russia as the leader of the "Wilayat Khorasan" unit of the international terrorist organization "Islamic State" operating in Afghanistan.

== Death rumors and whereabouts ==
On June 6, 2023, the GDI reportedly began a "grand operation" against ISIS–K in the Sirkanay District of Kunar Province with at least 3 hideouts destroyed and 14 ISIS–K members killed. The operation's objective was to kill or capture Ghafari and ISIS–K spokesman Sultan Aziz Azzam after an intelligence tip-off.

Pakistani media reported Ghafari's death on June 9 under "mysterious circumstances", citing Afghan and Pakistani intelligence officials. Voice of America also reported that Afghan and Pakistani intelligence sources confirmed his death, however wrote that a United States official and the United States Central Command could not give confirmation of the death. A Taliban spokesman stated that the reports could not be confirmed. The United Nations stated that these reports remain to be confirmed.

In March 2024, al-Mirsaad, a website believed to be associated with the Taliban's GDI, claimed that Ghafari lived in Balochistan with his close associates. These reports were corroborated by Reuters, citing sources in the Afghan and Pakistani Taliban who claim that he fled to Pakistan with injuries following the raid.
