= Fall of Kabul (2021) =

Taliban capture of the capital of Afghanistan

- Part of the 2021 Taliban offensive of the War in Afghanistan (2001–2021) and the war on terror
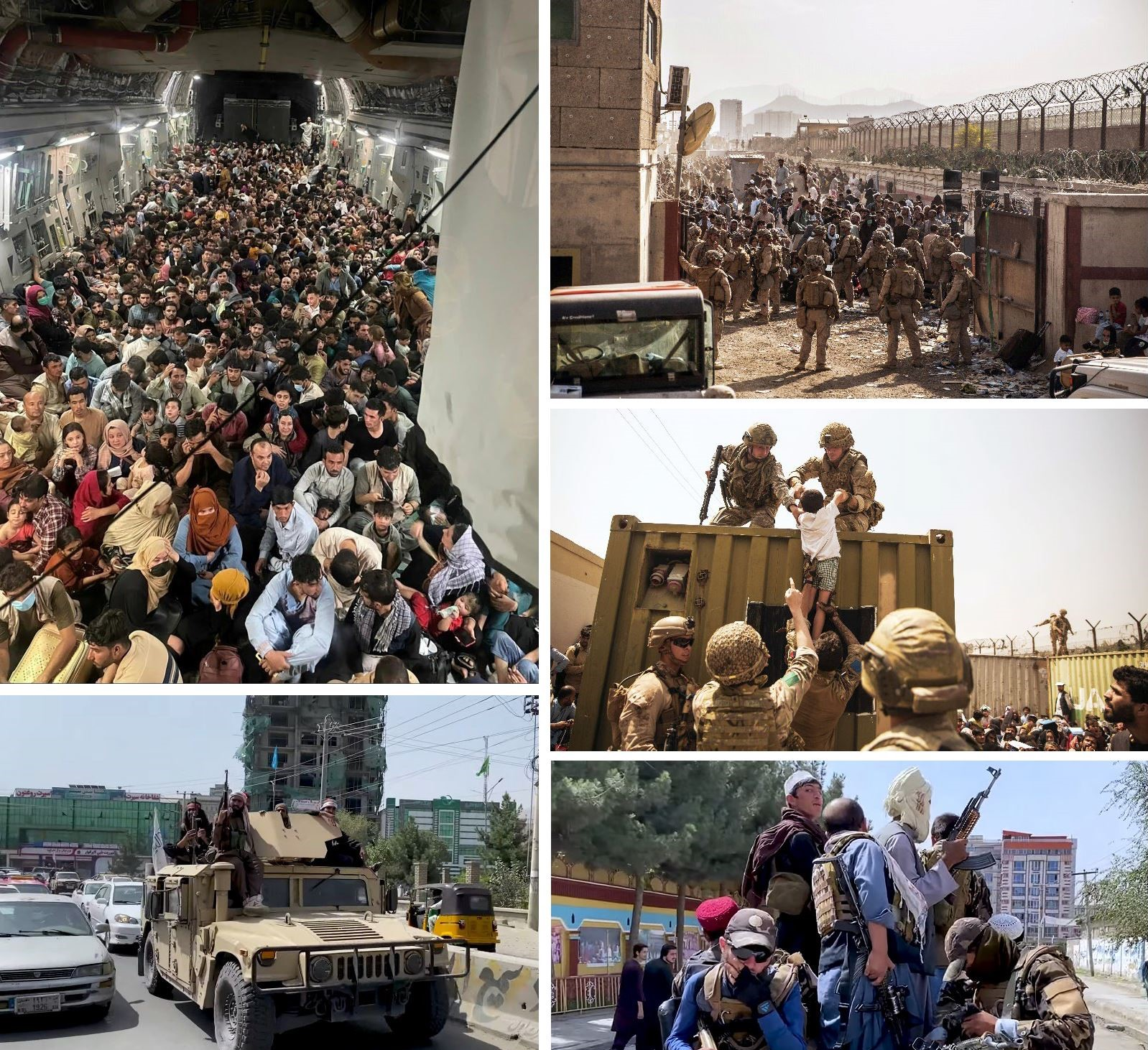
- Clockwise from top left: Afghans fleeing Kabul Airport aboard a U.S. Boeing C-17 Globemaster III; U.S. Marines assisting at an evacuation checkpoint at Hamid Karzai International Airport; Coalition soldiers assisting a child during the evacuation; Armed Taliban fighters in Kabul; Taliban fighters aboard a captured Humvee
Date	15 August 2021
Location	Kabul, Afghanistan
Result	Taliban victory: Collapse of the Islamic Republic of Afghanistan; End of the War in Afghanistan (2001–2021); Government officials flee Afghanistan, including President Ashraf Ghani; Re-establishment of the Islamic Emirate of Afghanistan; Hibatullah Akhundzada installed as supreme leader of Afghanistan; Evacuation of national and international diplomatic, military and civilian personnel (Operation Allies Refuge, Operation Pitting, Operation Devi Shakti); Anti-Taliban forces relocate to Panjshir; Start of the 2021–2022 Afghan protests
Territorial changes	Taliban control Kabul; NATO completely withdraws

Belligerents
Taliban; al-Qaeda	Afghanistan; United States

Commanders and leaders
(Taliban) Hibatullah Akhundzada; (Taliban) Mohammad Yaqoob; (Taliban) Abdul Ghani Baradar; (Taliban) Sirajuddin Haqqani; (Taliban) Abdul Qayyum Zakir; (Taliban) Salahuddin Ayubi; (Taliban) Hamdullah Mukhlis	(Islamic Republic of Afghanistan) Ashraf Ghani; (Islamic Republic of Afghanistan) Abdul Sattar Mirzakwal; (Islamic Republic of Afghanistan) Bismillah Khan; (Islamic Republic of Afghanistan) Hebatullah Alizai; (Islamic Republic of Afghanistan) Ahmad Zia Saraj; (Islamic Republic of Afghanistan) Sami Sadat; (United States) Joe Biden; (United States) Mark Milley

Units involved
Taliban units	(Islamic Republic of Afghanistan) Afghan National Security Forces; Afghan National Army; 201st Corps; 111th Division; Afghan National Police

On 15 August 2021, Afghanistan's capital city of Kabul was captured by the Taliban after a major insurgent offensive that began in May 2021. It was the final action of the War in Afghanistan, and marked a total victory for the Taliban. This led to the overthrowing of the Islamic Republic of Afghanistan under President Ashraf Ghani and the reinstatement of the Islamic Emirate of Afghanistan under the control of the Taliban.

The United States–Taliban deal, signed on 29 February 2020, is considered one of the most critical factors that caused the collapse of the Afghan National Security Forces (ANSF). Following the deal, the US dramatically reduced the number of air attacks and deprived the ANSF of a critical edge in fighting the Taliban insurgency.

Months before the fall, many in the United States Intelligence Community estimated that Kabul would be taken at least six months after the withdrawal of US troops from Afghanistan was completed. However, beginning in May 2021, even while the withdrawal was occurring, the Taliban was able to take most of Afghanistan's provinces in rapid succession during a major offensive. During this period, estimates for the longevity of the Afghan state declined significantly. Ultimately, US president Joe Biden conceded on 16 August that the collapse "unfold[ed] more quickly than [they] had anticipated".

Between 14 and 30 August 2021, the US and its coalition partners evacuated more than 123,000 people from Afghanistan via airlifts from Kabul International Airport (known then as Hamid Karzai International Airport). During the evacuation, the airport remained under NATO and US military control despite the collapse of the central government. Evacuees included foreign diplomatic staff and military personnel, third-country civilians, (Note: Non-US, non-Afghan nationals) Afghan allies and vulnerable Afghans such as journalists and human rights activists. The airlift was the largest non-combatant evacuation operation in US military history, with US military personnel transferring 79,000 civilians through the airport and out of Afghanistan over the 18-day mission.

After the United States' withdrawal on 30 August, a group of about 1,000 people, including US citizens and Afghans holding American visas, were still stranded in Kabul. Two weeks later, secretary of state Antony Blinken said it was several thousand US residents and one hundred US citizens.

== Background ==
=== US–Taliban deal ===
The United States–Taliban deal, also known as the "Agreement for Bringing Peace to Afghanistan", was a peace agreement signed by the United States and the Taliban on 29 February 2020 in Doha, Qatar. The deal was meant to bring the war in Afghanistan to an end. Significantly, the deal did not involve the then Afghan government, which led some experts to compare it to the Munich Agreement of 1938.

The deal stipulated fighting restrictions for both the US and the Taliban, including the withdrawal of all NATO forces from Afghanistan in return for counter-terrorism commitments from the Taliban. The US agreed to an initial reduction of its force level from 13,000 to 8,600 within 135 days (i.e., by July 2020), followed by a full withdrawal within 14 months (i.e., by 1 May 2021) if the Taliban kept its commitments. The US also committed to closing five military bases within 135 days, and expressed its intent to end economic sanctions on the Taliban by 27 August 2020.

The deal had a significant impact on the Afghan National Security Forces. US support for the Afghan military was significantly reduced. And according to the terms of the deal, US military aircraft could not attack Taliban groups waiting more than 500 meters away, giving the Taliban an edge in targeting Afghan military units.

The deal also exacerbated the decline in morale of the Afghan National Army and the Afghan National Police, leading to members bargaining with the Taliban. The Taliban was also able to spread propaganda and disinformation about the agreement, due to a lack of information and secret annexes in the agreement that were unknown even to the then Afghan government. The Taliban propaganda aimed to convince local police and military units that the US had already handed over territories to the Taliban, and that they should abandon their positions too.

=== 2021 Taliban offensive ===
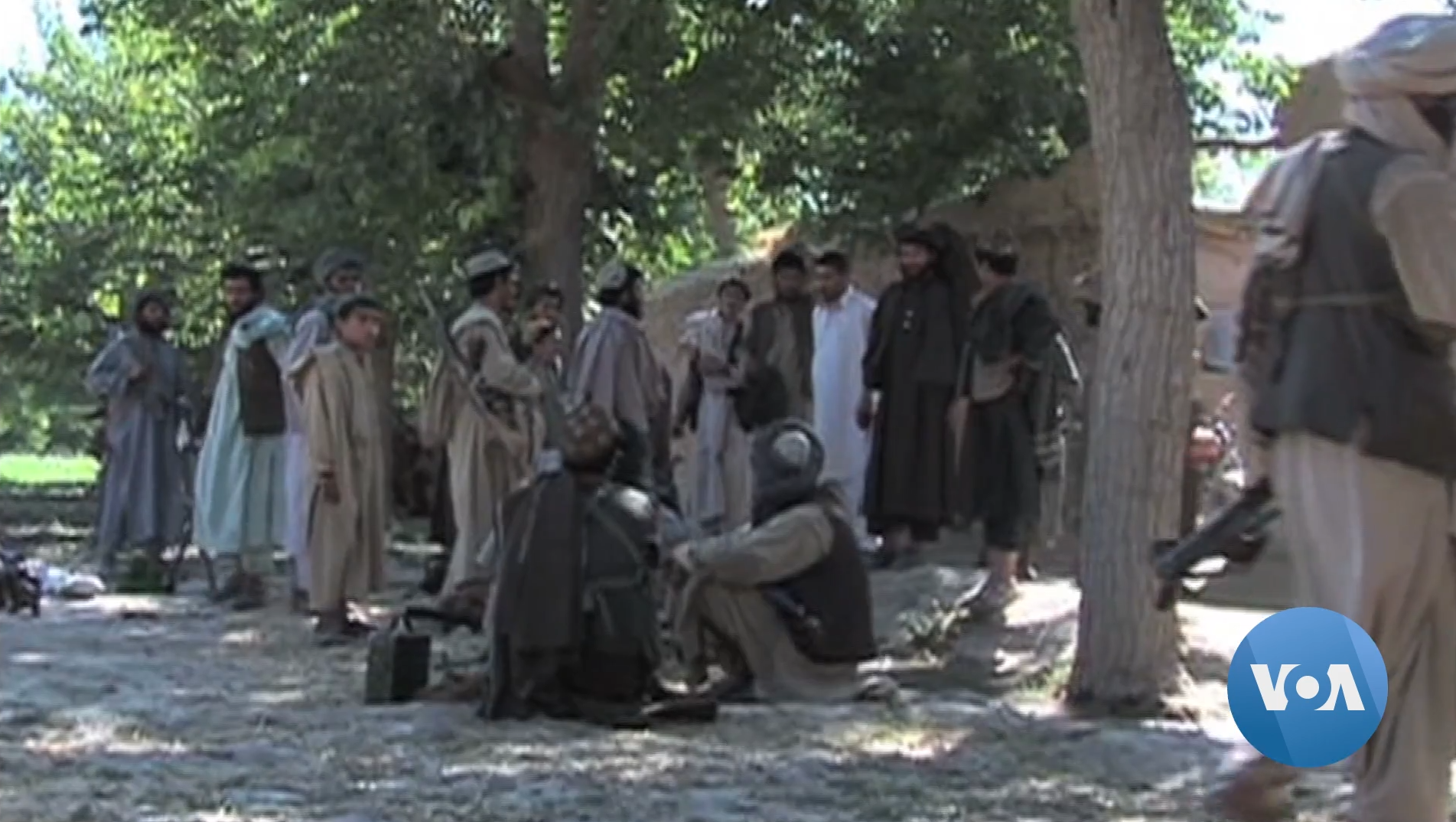
Taliban militants during the 2021 offensive

Weeks before the offensive, in April 2021, the US State Department urged American civilians in Afghanistan to "leave as soon as possible on available commercial flights".

On 1 May 2021, the Taliban and allied militant groups began a widespread offensive shortly after a significant portion of US troops withdrew from Afghanistan.

Following its rapid defeat across the country, the Afghan National Army was left in chaos, with only two units remaining operational by mid-August: the 201st Corps and 111th Division, both based in Kabul. The capital city was left encircled after Taliban forces had captured several significant cities, including Mihtarlam, Sharana, Gardez, Asadabad, as well as other districts in the east.

Projections for the longevity of the Afghan state declined significantly during the offensive. In July 2021, the US intelligence community concluded that the government of Afghanistan would collapse between six and 12 months after the departure of American troops. An early August assessment estimated that Kabul could hold out for several months. Just five days before the Taliban reached Kabul, another estimate suggested the capital would last "30 to 90 days". Finally, two days before the collapse, an estimate suggested the city would fall within the week.

The day before the fall, Afghanistan Policy Lab director Timor Sharan told Radio Free Europe/Radio Liberty that "shopping in the city today, I felt people were gripped by a sense of being stuck; stuck in an uncertain future and never able to dream, aspire, think, and believe anymore".

== Capture of Kabul ==
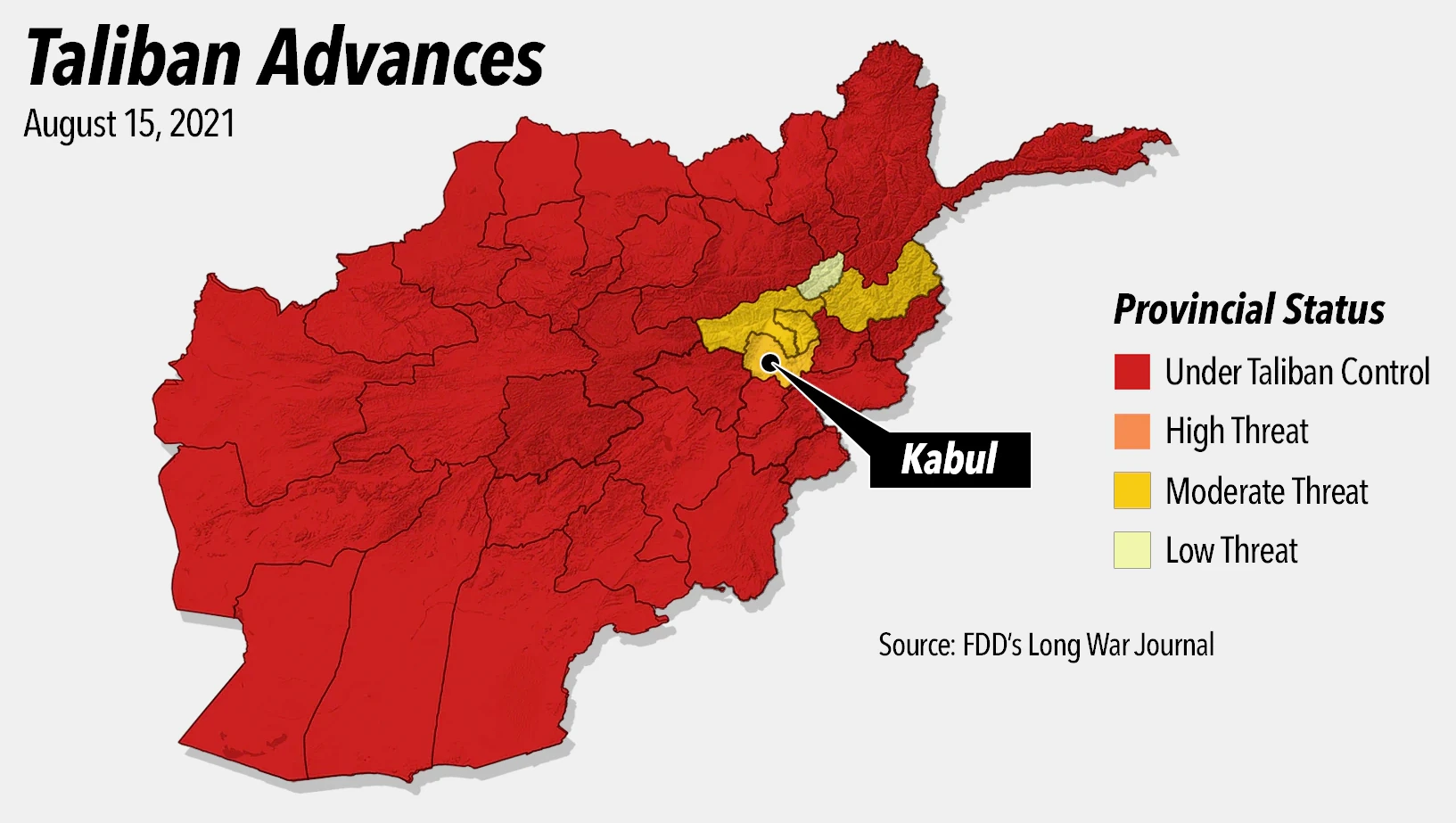
Taliban control of Afghanistan prior to the fall of Kabul

=== Collapse of the Afghan government ===
On 15 August 2021, the Taliban command instructed its forces to halt their advance at the gates of Kabul, declaring that they would not seize the city by force. Muhammad Nasir Haqqani, a Taliban commander, said that when he arrived at the city's gates, he did not find a single soldier or police officer in sight. Locals reported that Taliban fighters were advancing into the urban areas regardless of their official orders.

The insurgents then captured the Pul-e-Charkhi prison and released all inmates, reportedly including Islamic State – Khorasan Province and Al-Qaeda militants. During the skirmishes, the Taliban were reported to have killed around 150 IS-K militants, including the former chief Mawlawi Zia ul-Haq (also known as Abu Omar Khorasani). Bagram Airfield and the Parwan Detention Facility, which held 5,000 prisoners, also fell to the Taliban.

When they finally entered Kabul, Taliban fighters faced little to no resistance from the Afghan National Security Forces. The fighters began raising their flag throughout the city and pressuring police to hand over their weaponry.

During the fall, at least 22 Afghan Air Force planes and 24 helicopters carrying 585 Afghan military personnel fled to Uzbekistan. One Afghan A-29 Super Tucano crashed after crossing the border, with Uzbek authorities issuing conflicting reports on the cause. Two Afghan military planes carrying over 100 soldiers also landed in the Tajikistan city of Bokhtar.

The Afghan Interior Ministry announced that President Ashraf Ghani would relinquish power and an interim government led by the Taliban would be formed. Afterward, fighting died down, although many civilians remained fearful and holed up in their homes. By late morning on 15 August, Taliban negotiators arrived at the Arg, the presidential palace, to begin a transfer of power. Although negotiations were tense, the government declared its willingness to peacefully surrender Kabul to the rebels, and urged civilians to remain calm. Al Arabiya reported that a transitional government would be formed under the leadership of former minister Ali Jalali, but this was later denied by the Taliban.

==== Flight of President Ghani ====
After President Ashraf Ghani's address to the nation about the situation in Kabul on midday, Hamdullah Mohib spoke to Khalil Haqqani, a leader of the Taliban's Haqqani network, who asked him to surrender and suggested a meeting. Mohib called Tom West, Khalilzad's deputy in Doha, to tell him about the conversation with Haqqani. West advised him that the suggestion to meet might be an attempt to lure Mohib into a trap. After that, Mohib was telling President Ghani: "It's time, Mr. President. We have to leave." Later that day, President Ghani and members of his family and inner circle quietly fled from Afghanistan. Their own top lieutenants, important government members, and US officials were not informed they would escape until after they had already left. Upon learning Ghani had fled Kabul, President Biden "exploded in frustration".

At 11:00 p.m. local time, Ghani publicly announced on Facebook that he had fled in an attempt to minimize bloodshed, noting "the Taliban [had] won with the judgment of their swords and guns". In another account, he defended his actions: "Two different factions of the Taliban were closing in from two different directions ... and the possibility of a massive conflict between them that would destroy the city of five million and bring havoc to the people was enormous."

Ghani alleged that he did not initially plan to leave the country or even the city. He claims he first planned to take a car to the Ministry of Defense headquarters within Kabul, but the car never arrived. Instead, his national security advisor and chief of presidential security pressured him to escape the city by plane and fly to Khost, still within the country. However, once they were in the air, it was clear that "Khost had fallen and so had Jalalabad." Only then, Ghani alleges, did he realize he was going to leave Afghanistan.

Kabul's presidential palace, the Arg, was evacuated by helicopter. Meanwhile, Taliban co-founder Abdul Ghani Baradar arrived at the Hamid Karzai International Airport to prepare the takeover of government. At 8:55 p.m. local time, the Taliban claimed to have taken the Arg, which had been vacated by President Ghani earlier that day. Allegedly, all other palace employees were ordered to leave after Ghani's departure. Reporters from Al Jazeera were later allowed into the Arg to interview Taliban militiamen. At approximately 9:12 p.m. local time, it was reported that the Taliban would declare the Islamic Emirate of Afghanistan from the Arg, returning to the official symbolism of the Taliban government of 1996 to 2001.

Following the collapse of the central government, a handful of Afghan politicians, including the Speaker of the House of the People Mir Rahman Rahmani, fled the country and traveled to Pakistan. Defense Minister Bismillah Khan Mohammadi, Second Vice-president Sarwar Danish and Director General of the National Directorate of Security Ahmad Zia Saraj also left Afghanistan.

=== Impact on civilians ===
The Taliban advance alarmed many Kabul residents. Some locals, especially women, feared the restoration of Taliban rule and felt betrayed and abandoned by the Ghani government and NATO allies; a minority of residents celebrated the Taliban advance.

It was reported that sales of burqas (known as chadaree in Afghanistan) climbed in the days leading to the Taliban's arrival. Prices climbed from ؋200 to as much as ؋3,000 (approximately US$2.50 to $37.25), due to fears the Taliban would re-impose them as mandatory and target women who refused. One Kabul woman told The Guardian that female students had been evacuated from their university dormitories before the Taliban could reach them, and that university-educated women across the city were hiding their diplomas. Khalida Popal, former captain of the Afghanistan women's national football team, advised the women's national team players to burn their uniforms to avoid reprisals. Shops in the city were noted to have begun painting over and removing advertisements featuring women, and public posters featuring women were vandalized. Residents reported a large increase in food prices. It was reported that a significant number of vendors in Kabul were attempting to liquidate their stock in hopes of raising enough money to escape the country.

Concerns were quickly raised about the thousands of refugees who had fled Taliban advances elsewhere in the country and now found themselves stuck in Kabul. In the evening, the National Museum of Afghanistan posted a statement on Facebook stating "huge concern about safety of Museum's Artifacts and goods for Museum Employees". World Health Organization mobile health teams in the city were placed on hold because of safety concerns, and the delivery of medical supplies via the airport was significantly impacted.

The Taliban has countered accusations of discrimination against women as "propaganda".

== Kabul Airport evacuations ==
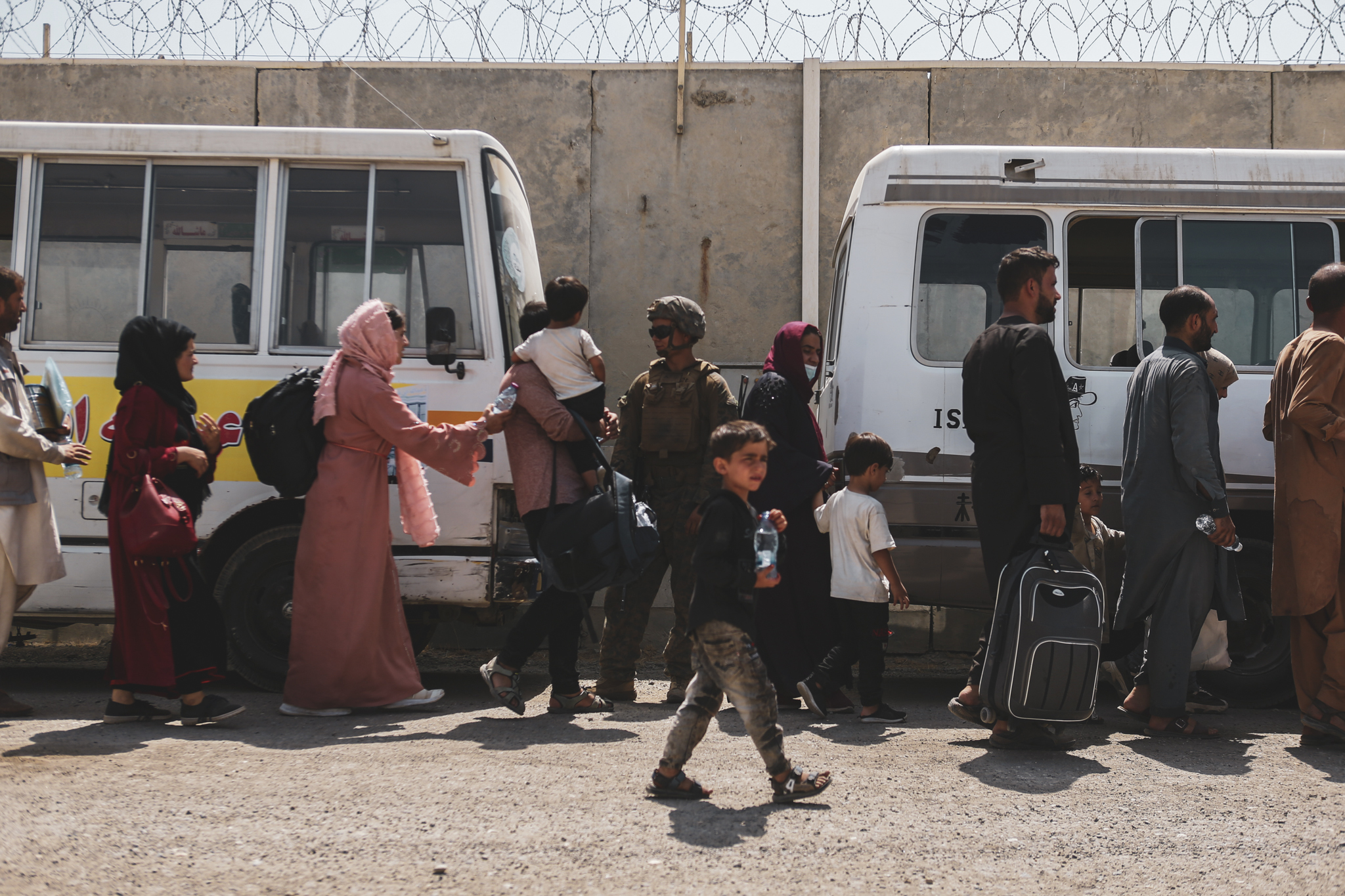
Evacuees load on to buses to be processed during an evacuation at Hamid Karzai International Airport, Kabul, Afghanistan

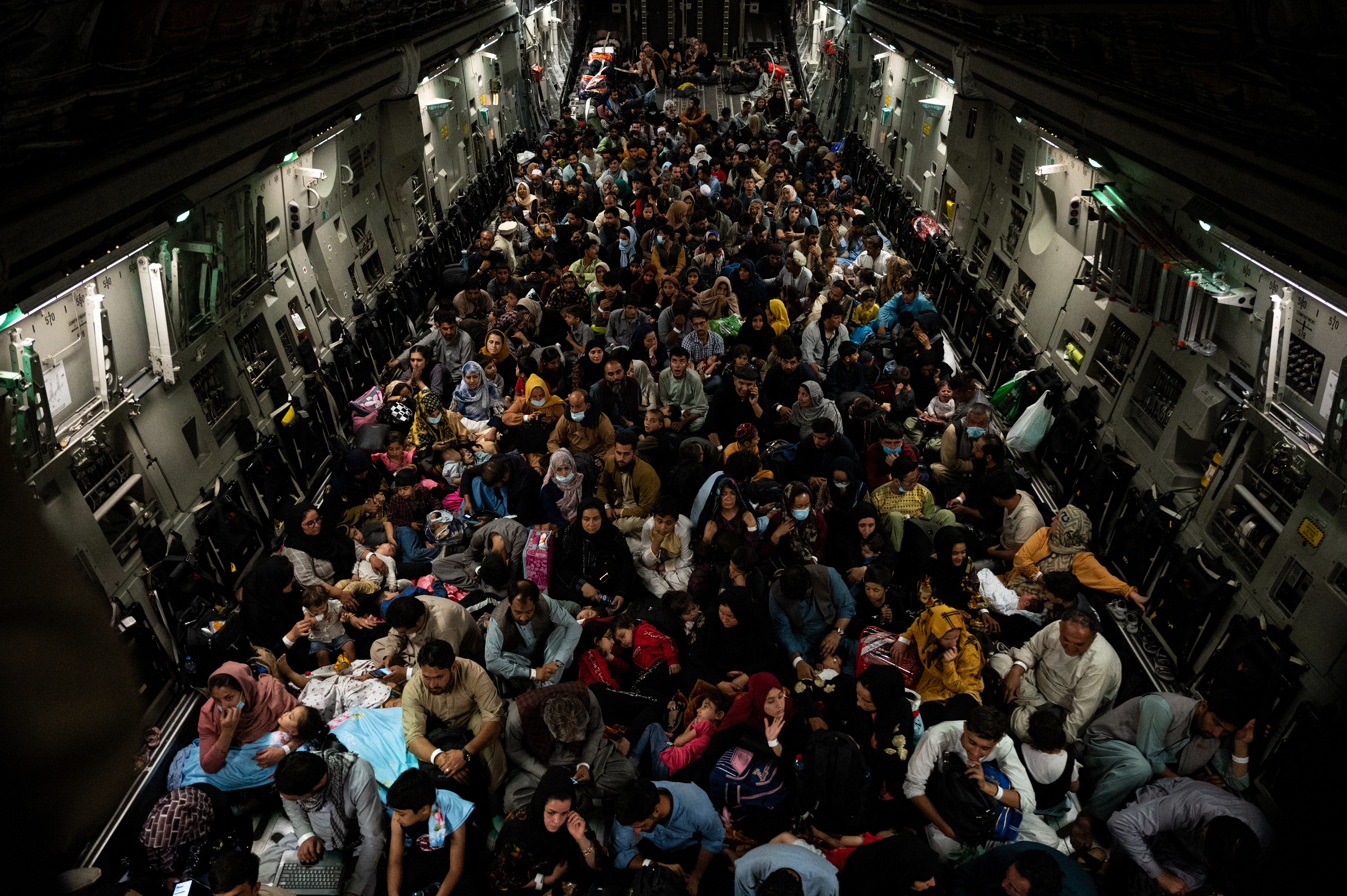
Fleeing civilians aboard a US Air Force transport plane at Kabul Airport on 19 August 2021

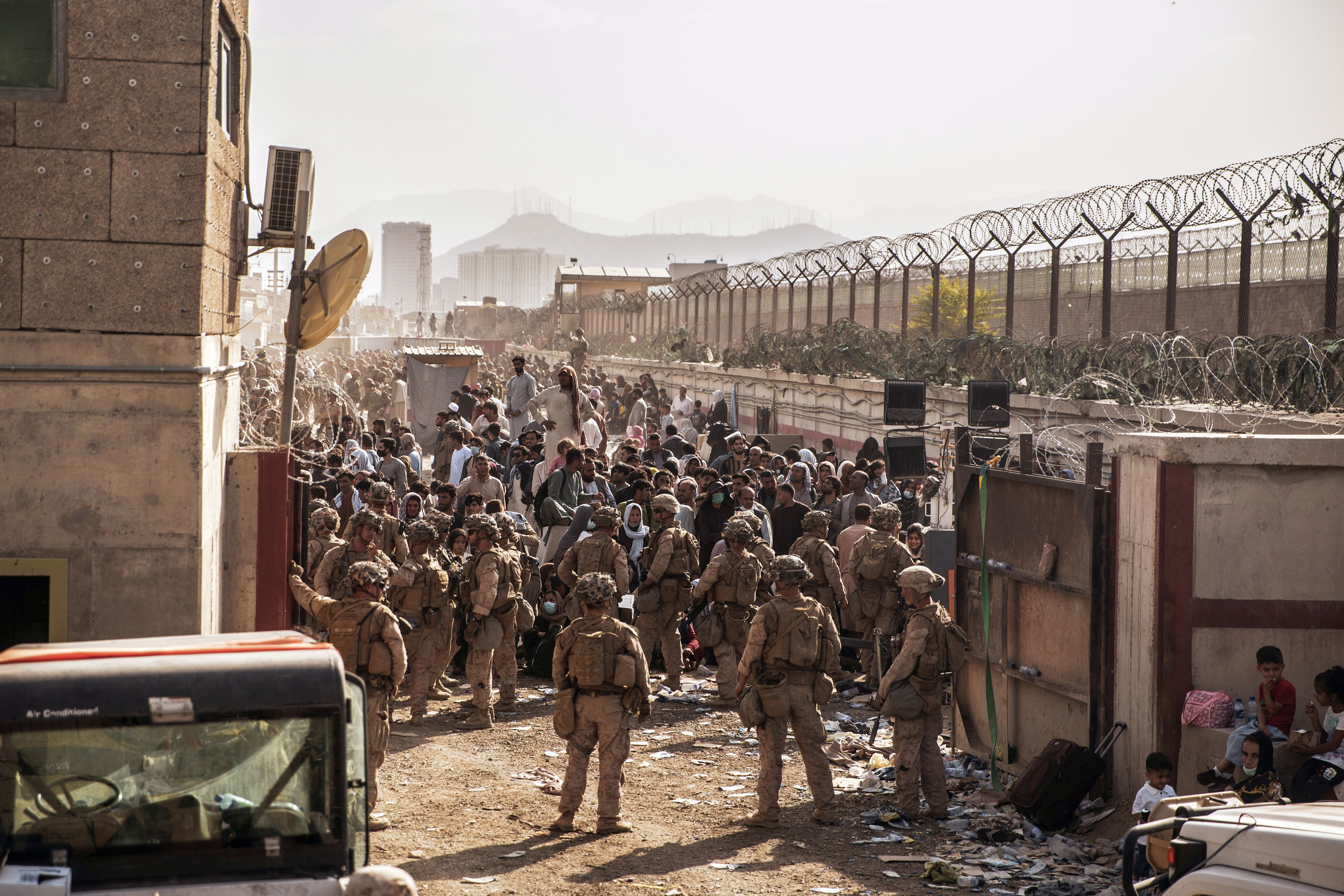
US Marines with SP-MAGTF-CR-CC at an evacuation checkpoint at Kabul Airport on 21 August

Since the Taliban had seized all border crossings, the Hamid Karzai International Airport remained the only secure route out of Afghanistan for those seeking to escape, as the US military and its NATO partners continued to provide security for the airport and airfield. The streets of Kabul were gridlocked with residents rushing towards the airport, with some abandoning their cars to make their way on foot through the traffic. Residents who had worked with the government and international organisations reported destroying their IDs to avoid being targeted by the Taliban, and many of those fleeing for the airport took no possessions with them. Long queues were reported outside of the airport and foreign embassies, with residents waiting in the heat in the hopes of being able to secure visas or flights out of the country.

After the fall of Herat on 13 August, the US and UK announced the deployment of 3,000 and 600 of their troops, respectively, to Kabul Airport in order to secure the airlifting of their nationals, embassy staff, and Afghan citizens who worked with coalition forces, out of the country. Between 14 and 30 August 2021 (when the US military completed its withdrawal from Afghanistan), the US and its coalition partners evacuated more than 123,000 people from Afghanistan via Kabul Airport. Evacuees included foreign diplomatic staff and military personnel, foreign civilians, Afghan allies, and vulnerable Afghans such as journalists and human rights activists. The airlift was the largest non-combatant evacuation mission in US military history, with US military personnel taking 79,000 civilians through the airport and out of Afghanistan over the 18-day mission. The Afghans who were permitted to leave were those with proper credentials; many held Special Immigrant Visas or other US visas. The majority of Afghan applicants for US visas, such as those who had served as interpreters for US forces during the 20-year war, were left behind.

Those evacuated included about 6,000 Americans, the vast majority of whom were dual US-Afghan citizens. The US government estimated that, at the time of the US military withdrawal from Afghanistan on 30 August 2021, there were "a small number of Americans, under 200 and likely closer to 100, who remain in Afghanistan and want to leave". The State Department had repeatedly urged Americans to leave Afghanistan since as early as March 2021, but some chose to remain in Afghanistan. Diplomatic efforts by the US to evacuate remaining Americans who wish to leave to country continued after the military withdrawal.

=== Suicide bombing and US drone strikes ===
On 26 August, a suicide bombing occurred at Kabul Airport, killing over 180 people and injuring over 150. Among the casualties were 169 Afghan civilians and 13 American troops. Earlier that day an intelligence report indicated that a "very lethal terror attack" was likely to take place at the airport within a few hours. The Islamic State's Afghanistan affiliate (ISIL-KP) claimed responsibility for the attack. According to reports, the US gave Taliban the names of Americans and Afghan allies to evacuate.

A US drone strike aimed at presumed Islamic State members suspected of planning a suicide bombings at the Kabul airport killed a family of 10 civilians in an adjacent car, including 7 children and an employee of a US aid organization. On 17 September, the Pentagon admitted the strike was a mistake.

== Reactions ==
Former Afghan president Hamid Karzai pressed publicly for a peaceful transition of power, promising he would remain in Kabul with his daughters. Other figures closely associated with the US-backed Afghan government, including Gul Agha Sherzai, the former governor of Nangahar province, congratulated Taliban on their victory.

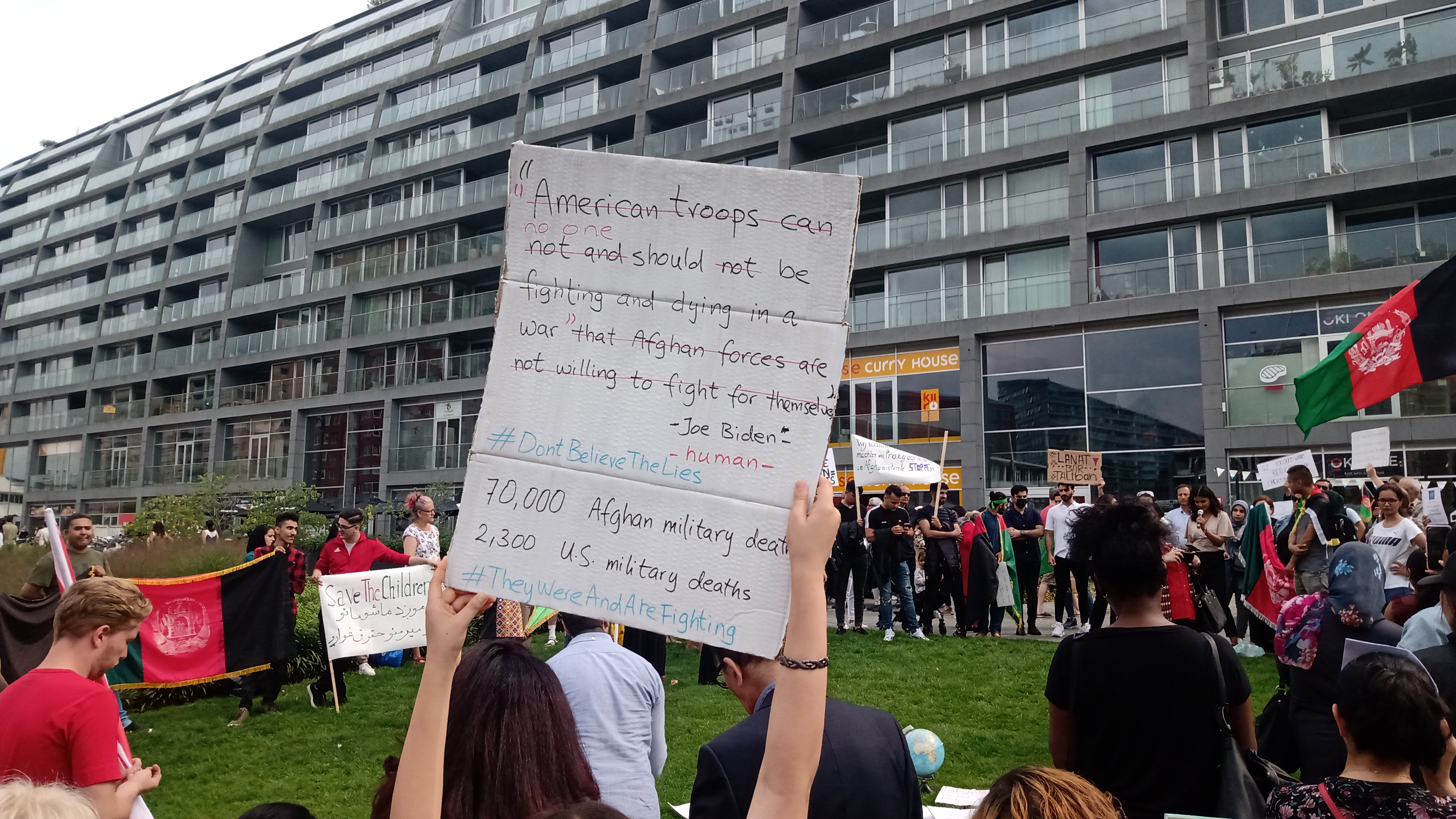
Protest in Rotterdam against the Taliban's takeover, 21 August 2021

The United States, Germany, Saudi Arabia, the United Arab Emirates, Canada, India, and Sweden evacuated their embassies. Some countries like China, Iran, Pakistan, Russia, Turkey, and Qatar said that they do not intend to shut down their embassies. Several governments, including Sweden, Germany, and Finland, announced that they would be suspending development aid to Afghanistan. Other countries, including those with no diplomatic presence in Afghanistan, have either started or hastened efforts to assist their citizens with leaving the country.

According to North Press, a Syrian news outlet, the morale of jihadist and extremist groups in regions such as Syria and Iraq, including Tahrir al-Sham, had risen dramatically following the fall of Kabul. Colin Clarke, research director at the Soufan Center stated that he was "expecting a heavy wave of propaganda [from jihadist groups], especially with the upcoming 20th anniversary of the September 11 attacks". The Taliban takeover was also applauded by the Palestinian militant group Hamas and some far-right supporters in North America and Europe.

British prime minister Boris Johnson blamed the United States for the Taliban's rapid takeover of Afghanistan. Mikhail Gorbachev, the leader of the Soviet Union who had overseen the Soviet withdrawal from Afghanistan in 1988, argued that "NATO and the United States should have admitted failure earlier" and that the NATO campaign in Afghanistan was "a failed enterprise from the start" which was founded on "the exaggeration of a threat and poorly defined geopolitical ideas". Nobel laureate Malala Yousafzai, who had survived a Tehrik-i-Taliban Pakistan assassination attempt in Pakistan in 2012, stated that she was in "complete shock" and was "deeply worried about women, minorities and human rights advocates". Afghan author Khaled Hosseini has also shared his concerns over the future of women's rights in Afghanistan, and expressed his hope that the Taliban would not return to the "violence and cruelty" of the 1990s. Human Rights Watch stated that "standing beside Afghan women in their struggle, and finding tools to pressure the Taliban and the political will to do so, is the least—the very least—the international community could do". Amnesty International stated that the situation was "a tragedy that should have been foreseen and averted" and called for governments to "take every necessary measure to ensure the safe passage out of Afghanistan for all those at risk of being targeted by the Taliban".

The fall of Afghanistan also had a negative impact on United Kingdom–United States and United States–European Union relations, with the British government leaking to the media complaints of the American government actions. In the UK, Foreign Secretary Dominic Raab faced calls to resign after it was revealed he had gone on holiday to Greece just prior to the fall and had refused attempts to contact him as developments occurred. The American government, led by President Joe Biden, also faced significant domestic criticism. Former American presidents George W. Bush, Barack Obama, and Donald Trump, each of whom had overseen significant developments in the War in Afghanistan, also faced criticism. President Biden's approval rating dropped to 41% and only 26% of Americans said they support Biden's handling of the situation in Afghanistan. Some Republicans, including Senators Josh Hawley, Marsha Blackburn, and former Ambassador Nikki Haley, called on Biden to resign. Some American white nationalists and related extremists celebrated the Taliban takeover and American withdrawal on social media. White nationalist Nick Fuentes posted on the Telegram messaging service, "The Taliban is a conservative, religious force, the US is godless and liberal. The defeat of the US government in Afghanistan is unequivocally a positive development". Some experts warned American extremists would use events in Afghanistan to push disinformation, organize and recruit.

== Analysis ==
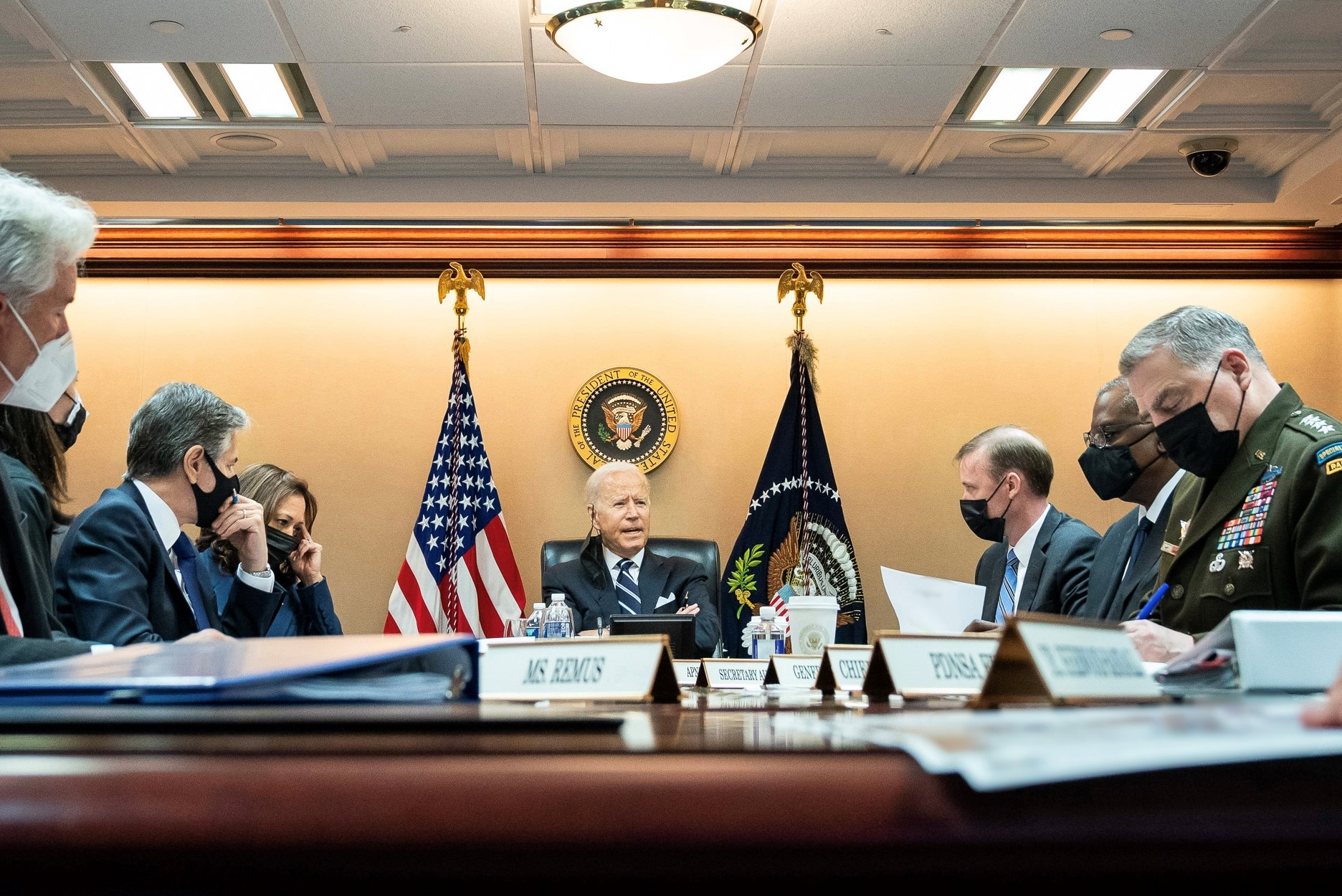
US President Joe Biden discussing the fall of Kabul with the National Security Council on 18 August 2021

Multiple commentators and public figures described the fall of Kabul and of the Islamic republic as a significant disaster and a failure for NATO. German politician Armin Laschet, minister-president of North Rhine-Westphalia and successor to Angela Merkel as CDU/CSU leader, stated that it was "the biggest debacle that NATO has suffered since its creation and it's a change of era that we are confronted with". British parliamentary Foreign Affairs Select Committee chairman Tom Tugendhat stated that the collapse was "the biggest single policy disaster since Suez". Journalist Nick Turse argued that "without a true reevaluation this time around, the US risks falling into well-worn patterns that may, one day, make the military debacles in Southeast and Southwest Asia look terribly small".

Some, however, rejected claims of failure. Addressing the House of Commons on 18 August, British prime minister Boris Johnson argued that the UK had joined "a mission to extirpate al-Qaeda in that country and to do whatever we could to stabilise Afghanistan, in spite of all the difficulties and challenges we knew we would face and we succeeded in that core mission", additionally stating that "what is not true is to say the UK government was unprepared or did not foresee this".

The 45th president of the United States, Donald Trump, described the execution of the withdrawal of troops as the greatest "humiliation" in the history of his country and stated that he would have first taken out the American civilians and diplomats, then their Afghan collaborators, all the advanced equipment of the Afghan National Army donated by the US army and in last place take out the military, all this with the condition that the Taliban complied with the US–Taliban deal. The former president is also against the interventionist policy of his country, describing it as a "horrible decision" to have intervened in the Middle East and that it has not improved the situation in the last 20 years.

=== Causes ===
==== Collapse of Afghan government and security forces ====
US intelligence assessments originally concluded Kabul would fall within months or weeks following withdrawal of American forces from Afghanistan, though the security situation rapidly deteriorated, leading President Joe Biden to concede on 16 August that "this did unfold more quickly than we had anticipated".

Several Afghan officials placed the blame for the collapse at the feet of the Ghani government. Afghan National Reconciliation Council chairman Abdullah Abdullah denounced Ghani's fleeing of the country, stating that "The former president of Afghanistan left Afghanistan, leaving the country in this difficult situation. God should hold him accountable". General Bismillah Khan Mohammadi, former ANA chief of staff and interim minister of defence, tweeted "They tied our hands from behind and sold the country. Curse Ghani and his gang". NATO Secretary General Jens Stoltenberg stated that "ultimately, the Afghan political leadership failed to stand up to the Taliban... This failure of the Afghan leadership led to the tragedy we are witnessing today".

The imminent collapse of the Afghan National Security Forces (ANSF), and their inability to withstand the Taliban offensive has also been the subject of focus. It has been argued that despite the US investing over $85 billion to train and equip Afghan security forces since 2001, the Afghan forces had proven to be woefully inept, inadequate and poorly trained to counter the looming insurgency.

United States press sources explain that Ghani and his cabinet visited the White House in 25 June, asked for US support and were stunned to realize that the Biden administration evaded any compromise to provide the helicopters or logistical support to the Afghan military they asked. Afghan chair of the Afghanistan Independent Human Rights Commission was stunned to discover that many of the Americans had already "concluded that Afghanistan was a lost cause, and had sort of made peace with themselves." They asked her what contingency plans she was making to flee Kabul and go into exile. The previous Trump US administration was determined to end the war with or without the Afghan President's involvement, appointed a special envoy, Zalmay Khalilzad, to negotiate directly with the Taliban with clear instructions to "make a deal with the Taliban that would allow for a quick American military withdrawal". The deal with the Taliban reached by the Biden administration included the US led coalition not attacking the Taliban in return for the Taliban not attacking US coalition troops but allowed Taliban to attack Afghan forces.

==== NATO withdrawal ====
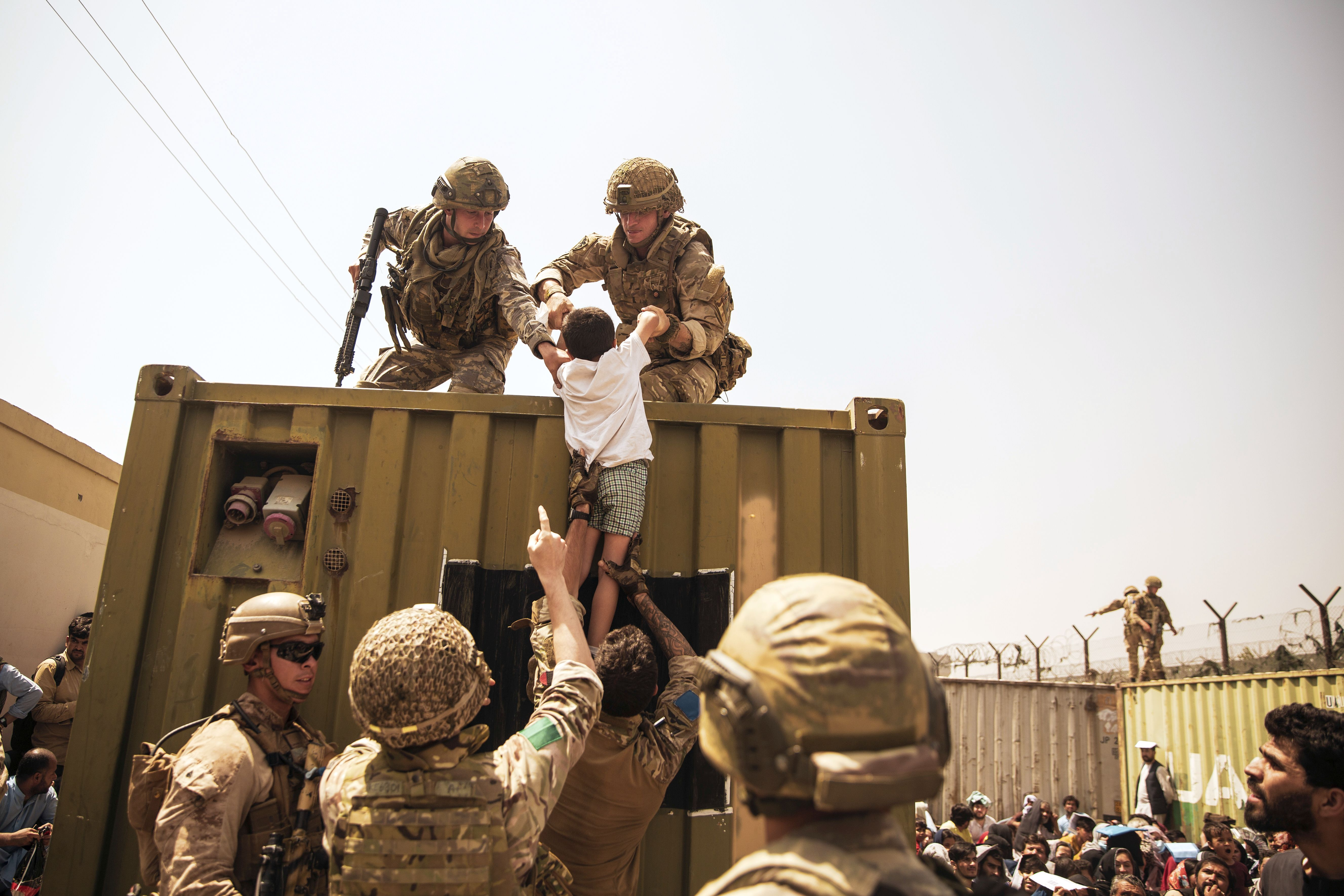
American, British, and Turkish soldiers assist a child evacuating from Kabul Airport, 20 August 2021

David E. Sanger, a New York Times correspondent, analyzed the decision to leave Afghanistan by Joe Biden, and consequently the manner of the fall of Kabul, as the result of four basic assumptions, or miscalculations: that there was enough time before the Afghan government collapsed for the US to withdraw, that the Afghan forces had "the same drive" to win as the Taliban did, that there was "a well-planned system for evacuating the embassy" and Afghans who had helped the US and their families, and that if the Taliban made it to Kabul, that there would be a "bloody block-by-block civil war" taking place in its streets.

=== Comparisons ===
==== Egypt 1956 ====
In an article in The Conversation, William Maley, an emeritus at the Australian National University, compared the fall of Kabul to the 1956 Suez Crisis and its effects on the perception of the United Kingdom as a global power, stating that Biden had "failed the people of Afghanistan and tarnished US credibility around the world", stating that the United States "increasingly appears a fading power internationally". According to Maley, the collapse of the Islamic Republic of Afghanistan is due to Biden's inexperience in the field of foreign policy, Western lack of understanding of Afghan society, and the legitimization that the Taliban received with the Trump-led US–Taliban deal. He concluded by quoting former British prime minister David Lloyd George, who said in 1940 that "our promissory notes are now rubbish on the market", stating that, as a result of its failures over Afghanistan, the Biden administration is rapidly heading in a similar direction.

==== Cuba 1961 ====
Former American defense secretary Leon Panetta compared the fall of Kabul to the failed Bay of Pigs Invasion of Cuba in 1961, saying that "President Kennedy took responsibility for what took place. I strongly recommend to President Biden that he take responsibility ... admit the mistakes that were made".

==== Vietnam 1975 ====
External images
- A widely-shared image shows a helicopter landing in the US Embassy courtyard. The Army CH-47 Chinook evacuated diplomatic staff to Kabul airport as the city fell.
- Many comparisons were drawn to a similar photo from the fall of Saigon In it, a Marine CH-46 Sea Knight landed on the embassy roof to evacuate the final Americans in South Vietnam.

The events were compared by many commentators and the public to the Fall of Saigon at the end of Vietnam War in April 1975. A month before the Taliban arrived in Kabul, American president Joe Biden had rejected the comparison, stating that "the Taliban is not the North Vietnamese Army... There's going to be no circumstance for you to see people being lifted off the roof of an embassy of the United States from Afghanistan. It is not at all comparable".

Reporters argued that Biden's comments did not age well, as embassy staff burned documents and "helicopters were pictured hovering above the compound, shuttling diplomats to the airport" less than a month later. Rear Admiral Larry Chambers, who had given the order to push helicopters off the USS Midway during Operation Frequent Wind to make way for more evacuee aircraft from Saigon to land, stated that "what is happening now is worse than what happened in Vietnam", elaborating "[In Vietnam] we tried to get out as many people who worked with us as we could... In Afghanistan, we are abandoning the folks who supported us while we were there".

On the day the Taliban entered Kabul, American secretary of state Blinken rejected the comparison to Saigon, stating on an ABC's This Week interview that "this is manifestly not Saigon. We went into Afghanistan 20 years ago with one mission in mind, and that was to deal with the people who attacked us on 9/11, and that mission has been successful".

The contemporary Vietnamese establishment itself is also critical of the Saigon comparison, saying that it downplays what they see as Vietnam's rightful military resistance against the US, while maliciously placing Vietnam into the same category as the Taliban.

==== Afghanistan 1992 ====
Ross Douthat of The New York Times compared the 1992 fall of Kabul with the fall in 2021 and remarked that the Soviet-backed Democratic Republic of Afghanistan managed to survive against the Afghan mujahideen for 3 years after the withdrawal of Soviet forces, compared to the few months for the American-backed Islamic Republic of Afghanistan. Zamir Kubalov, the Russian envoy for Afghanistan also remarked that the "regime created by the Americans tumbled down even before they left" in comparison to the Soviet withdrawal from Afghanistan.

==== Iraq 2014 ====
Ibrahim al-Marashi of California State University, San Marcos compared it to the 2014 Northern Iraq offensive, in which IS overran large parts of Iraq and proclaimed a caliphate, arguing that the collapses were caused by the imposition of "rigid, hierarchical American military doctrine" on the Afghan and Iraqi militaries, that the Taliban and Daesh were more cohesive armed groups, and that the NATO-backed Afghan and Iraqi governments had "allowed networks of patronage and corruption to take root". The Iraqi government and army were equally plagued by structural corruption and unknown number of ghost soldiers.

==== Ukraine ====
Security Council of Russia secretary Nikolai Patrushev compared the situation to Ukraine–United States relations, stating that "a similar situation awaits supporters of the American choice in Ukraine". The collapse led to the Biden administration receiving immense criticism, and has challenged Biden's policy of pro-activeness in aiding US allies. Russia invaded Ukraine six months after the fall of Kabul; former Prime Minister of Sweden Carl Bildt wrote in The Diplomatic Courier that failure in Afghanistan may have caused Russia to feel safer to attack Ukraine.

==== Taiwan ====
State-run media in China compared the situation in Afghanistan to the United States' relations with Taiwan. It questioned the former's commitment to defend the latter if China decides to take control of Taiwan, which it claims to be its province, by force.

== Aftermath ==
Taliban fighters blocking civilians from entering Kabul Airport, 16 August 2021

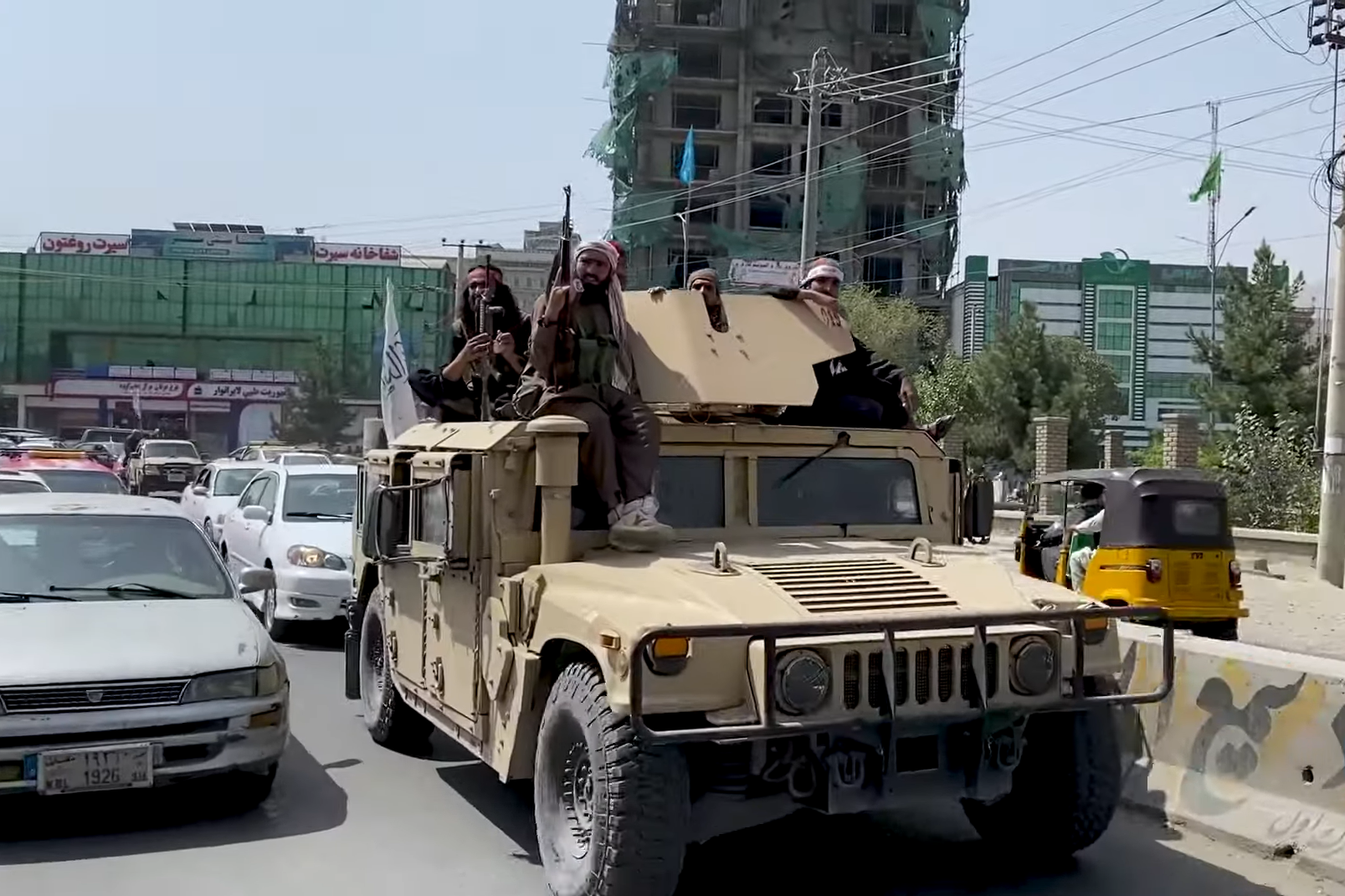
Taliban fighters patrolling Kabul in a Humvee, 17 August 2021

The day after the fall of Kabul, 16 August, most of the city's streets had been deserted, save for those leading to the airport, with businesses shuttered and security checkpoints unmanned. Taliban fighters, however, were sighted parading their flag and weapons and taking selfies next to Kabul landmarks. Taliban soldiers were also sighted going door-to-door searching for Afghan government workers and human rights activists. In the days after the fall, some residents reported that the Taliban had re-imposed a ban on women leaving their homes without a male guardian present. Furthermore, multiple female-owned businesses in the city were shut down. Local television stations began to censor foreign and entertainment broadcasts, while state-owned broadcasters stopped broadcasting almost all but Taliban statements and Islamic sermons. The Taliban had also started to remove female journalists from their positions.

On 17 August, the Taliban held their first official news conference in Kabul, with spokesman Zabihullah Mujahid stating that the Taliban wished to "assure the international community, including the United States that nobody will be harmed in Afghanistan" and that "after consultations that are going to be completed very soon, we will be witnessing the formation of a strong Islamic and inclusive government". On 21 August, Taliban co-founder and political leader Abdul Ghani Baradar arrived in Kabul for the first time in over a decade as the Taliban began internal negotiations on how to govern the country.

On the evening of 18 August, the Ministry of Foreign Affairs and International Cooperation of the United Arab Emirates (UAE) announced that it had welcomed former president Ghani into the UAE on humanitarian grounds. On 19 August, Ghani released a video denying reports he had carried a large sum of money with him as he fled and that he was negotiating a return to Afghanistan. Other government, military or anti-Taliban officials also fled to India, Pakistan, Tajikistan, and Uzbekistan.

In the days following the fall, United States government agencies began erasing public articles and images featuring Afghan civilians from their websites, fearing that the new Taliban government might use those websites to identify and target civilians for reprisals. The U.S. government also announced that it would be freezing $9.5 billion worth of assets belonging to Da Afghanistan Bank, the Afghan central bank, in order to prevent Taliban access to the funds. The International Monetary Fund also announced that it would be denying the Taliban access to special drawing rights. The Western Union and MoneyGram also suspended their financial services in Afghanistan.

Furthermore, several social media companies, including Facebook and YouTube, announced that they would continue to ban Taliban content from their platforms. Facebook also put a feature in place allowing Afghans to lock their accounts to prevent the Taliban from collecting their information. The Taliban have decried such bans, arguing that it infringes on their right to free speech. A surge in the creation of new, pro-Taliban accounts was reported on Twitter, one of the few social media companies that did not ban the group, in the days after the fall.

=== Refugees ===
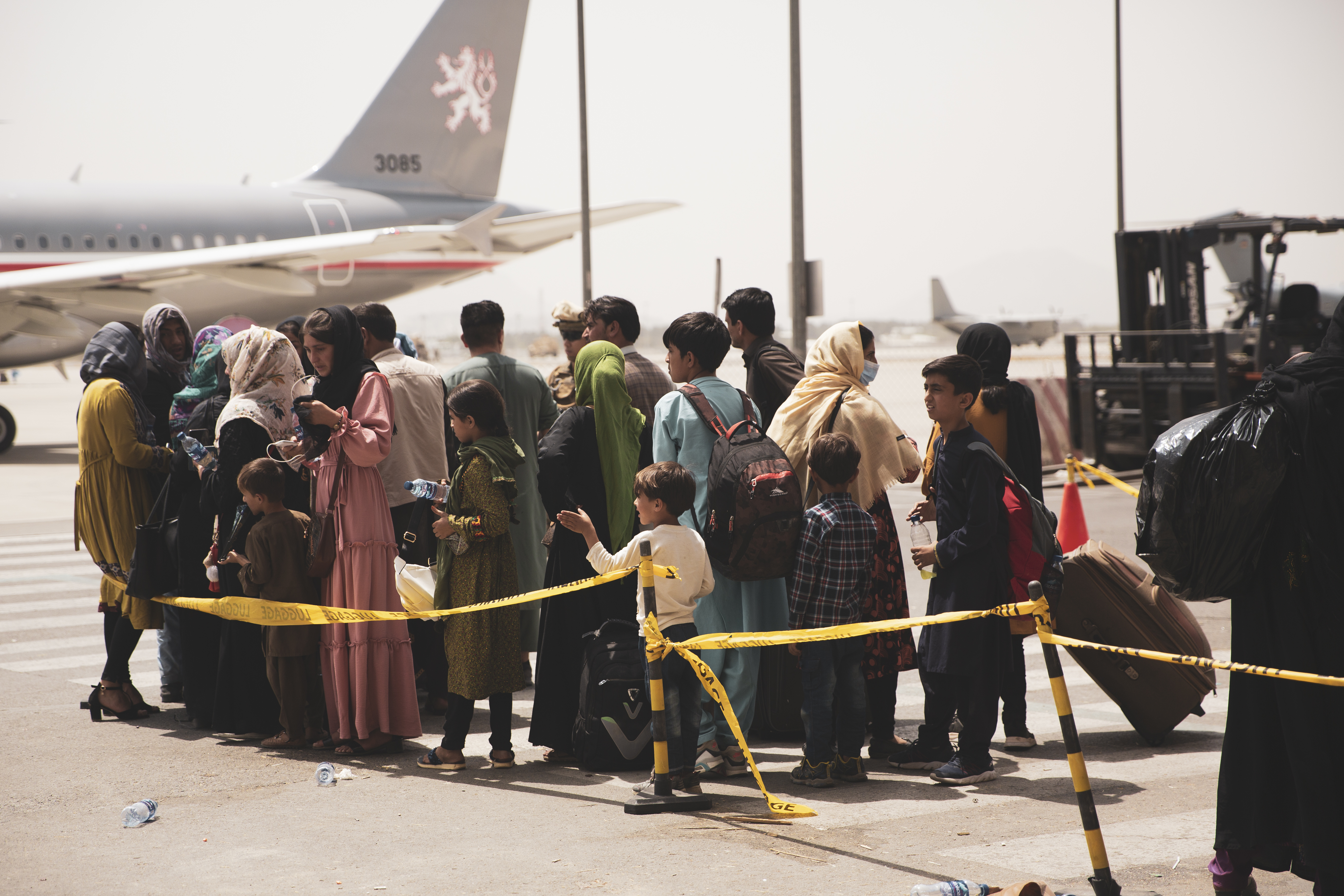
Civilians preparing to be airlifted from Kabul Airport, 18 August 2021

After the fall of Kabul and the Islamic Republic, a surge in refugees trying to escape from the Taliban was to be expected. Therefore, in the days following the toppling of the Islamic Republic, numerous governments announced their plans regarding the number of refugees they were going to take in. After the capture of Kabul, more than 300,000 Afghan civilians who worked for the US were at risk of Taliban retaliation. As a result, an internationally organized airlift was conducted to prevent any harm from befalling these civilians. This operation was spearheaded by the US and on 30 August, the mission concluded with more than 123,000 people being escorted out of the country via airlift.

The endeavor to evacuate all these civilians did not go uncontested. The Taliban did not comply with the airlift, and tensions surrounding the airport were very high. On 26 August, an ISIS suicide attack killed 13 US soldiers and 170 civilians at the international airport. After a couple of months of research, the US military concluded that the assault was done by a lone bomber and could have been prevented. The event was confusing with the US army and Taliban accusing each other of initially opening fire. American retaliation followed soon and three days later, out of fear of a bloody repetition, the US wrongfully targeted a white car with a drone strike, killing 10 civilians including seven children.

A number of countries refused to grant asylum to Afghans who had been working as embassy guards as many of those guards had been technically employed as contractors. On 19 August 125 guards of the Embassy of the United Kingdom, Kabul were told by telephone they no longer had jobs and were ineligible for UK protection because they were employed through a contractor, GardaWorld, unlike guards at the US embassy who were evacuated. It was reported on 16 June 2022, that these guards were targeted by the Taliban for beatings alongside Afghans who worked under the British Embassy. Finnish minister of foreign affairs Pekka Haavisto stated that the Finnish embassy guards were "sub-contractors" and could not be included on evacuation lists. The Australian government had initially announced the same for their embassy guards, but backtracked a day later and granted them visas.

The immense collective action taken to airlift civilians at risk under the rule of the Taliban was not an easy feat and far from finished. The escape from Afghanistan was the first step in an exhausting journey, most civilians had left the country in a panic and did not bring or possess the right documentation. Many civilians were transferred to transit hubs in states like Italy, Germany and Qatar where they await further decisions from resettlement organisations. The process to resettle an enormous group of refugees is very complicated, especially because many of these refugees try to enter the US, with or without the correct visas. As of August 2023, as many as 150,000 Afghans who had assisted the United States remained in Afghanistan, including individuals who had worked closely with US military forces.

=== Resistance ===
==== Panjshir conflict ====
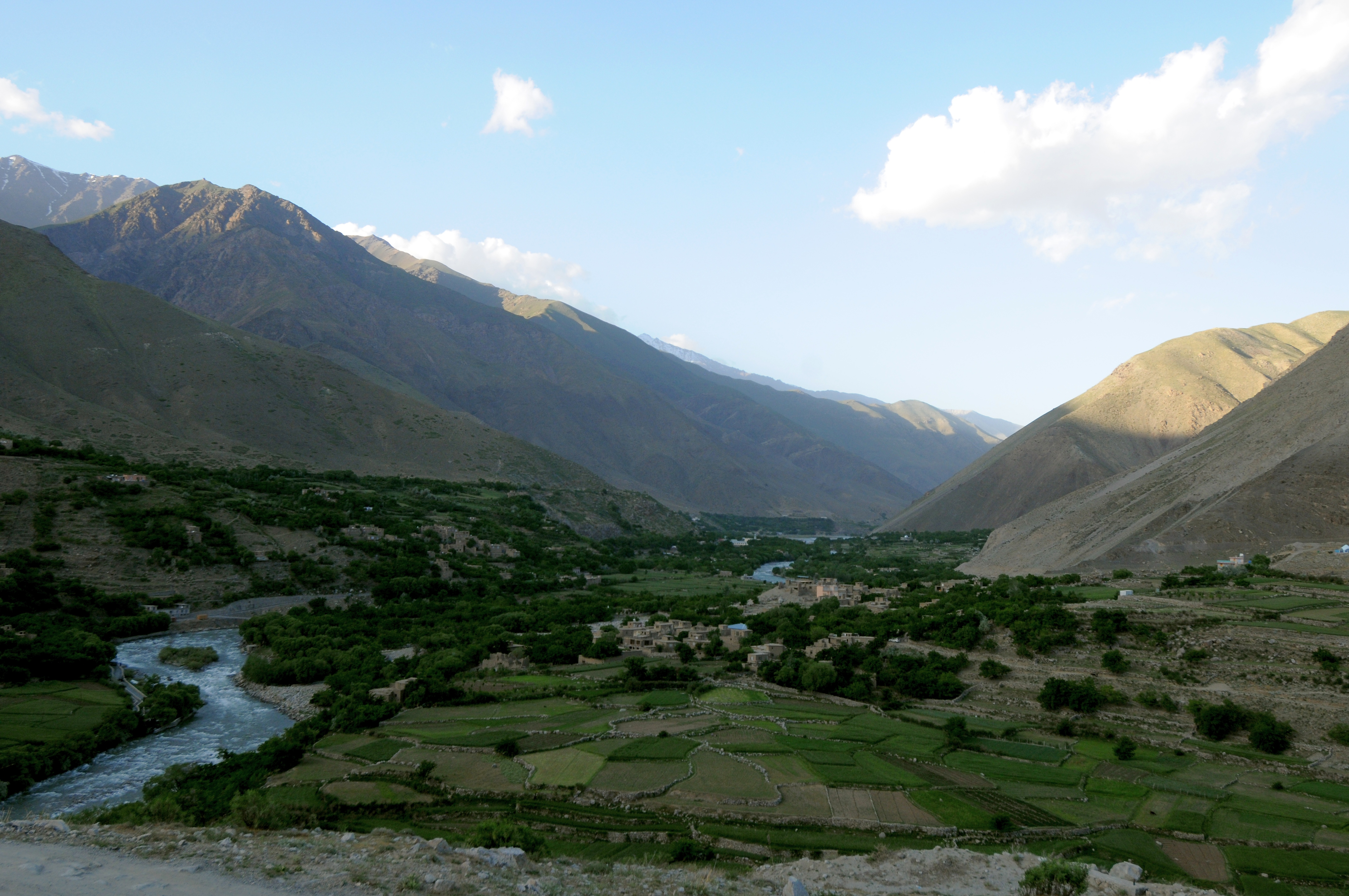
The Panjshir Valley

With the fall of Kabul, former Northern Alliance members and other anti-Taliban forces based in the province Panjshir, led by Ahmad Massoud and former vice president Amrullah Saleh, became the primary organized resistance to the Taliban in Afghanistan. The Afghan embassy in Tajikistan replaced their presidential portrait of Ghani with one of Saleh and submitted a request to Interpol to have arrest warrants issued for Ghani, along with his chief advisor Fazel Mahmood and National Security Advisor Hamdullah Mohib, on charges of having stolen from the Afghan treasury. Massoud has stated his desire to negotiate with the Taliban.

The conflict between the Taliban and the National Resistance Front of Afghanistan (NRF), formerly known as the Northern Alliance, ostensibly had concluded on 6 September, when Taliban fighters took the Panjshir Valley, the final holdout of resistance. However, the NRF has not been wiped out and the resistance to Taliban leadership is still existing, although on a lesser scale than its initial size. On 7 May 2022, the insurgent group claimed they had taken control over three northern districts in Panjshir. The Taliban denied this, saying that these claims were untrue.

==== Protests ====
On 17 August, a small protest was held by several women in Kabul demanding equal rights for women, the first reported women's protest against the new government. On 18 August, larger protests also attended by men emerged in three eastern Pashtun-dominated cities: Jalalabad, Khost, and Asadabad, with protestors waving the flag of the Islamic Republic of Afghanistan, and taking down the Taliban flag. In Jalalabad, the Taliban opened fire, killing three and wounding over a dozen. On 19 August, demonstrations spread to various parts of Kabul, including one large protest near Kabul Airport where cars and people waved the flag of the republic, and another with over 200 people gathered near the presidential palace in Kabul before it was violently dispersed by the Taliban. Protests continued in Khost and Asadabad as well, with the Taliban using violence to disperse protests in both. In Asadabad, protests were reported as swelling to the hundreds. The response of the Taliban came as they fired into the crowd, shooting and killing at least two people.

During the months after the fall of Kabul, there have been some protests against Taliban decision-making. On 26 December, hundreds took to the streets of the Anaba District after the Taliban admittedly killed a man in a misunderstanding. Openly protesting the Taliban does not come without consequences and over the span of multiple weeks at the beginning of 2022, some activists were possibly detained by the Islamic Emirate. On 12 February, Afghan women protested against the Taliban and demanded the release of the missing female activists.

=== Women ===
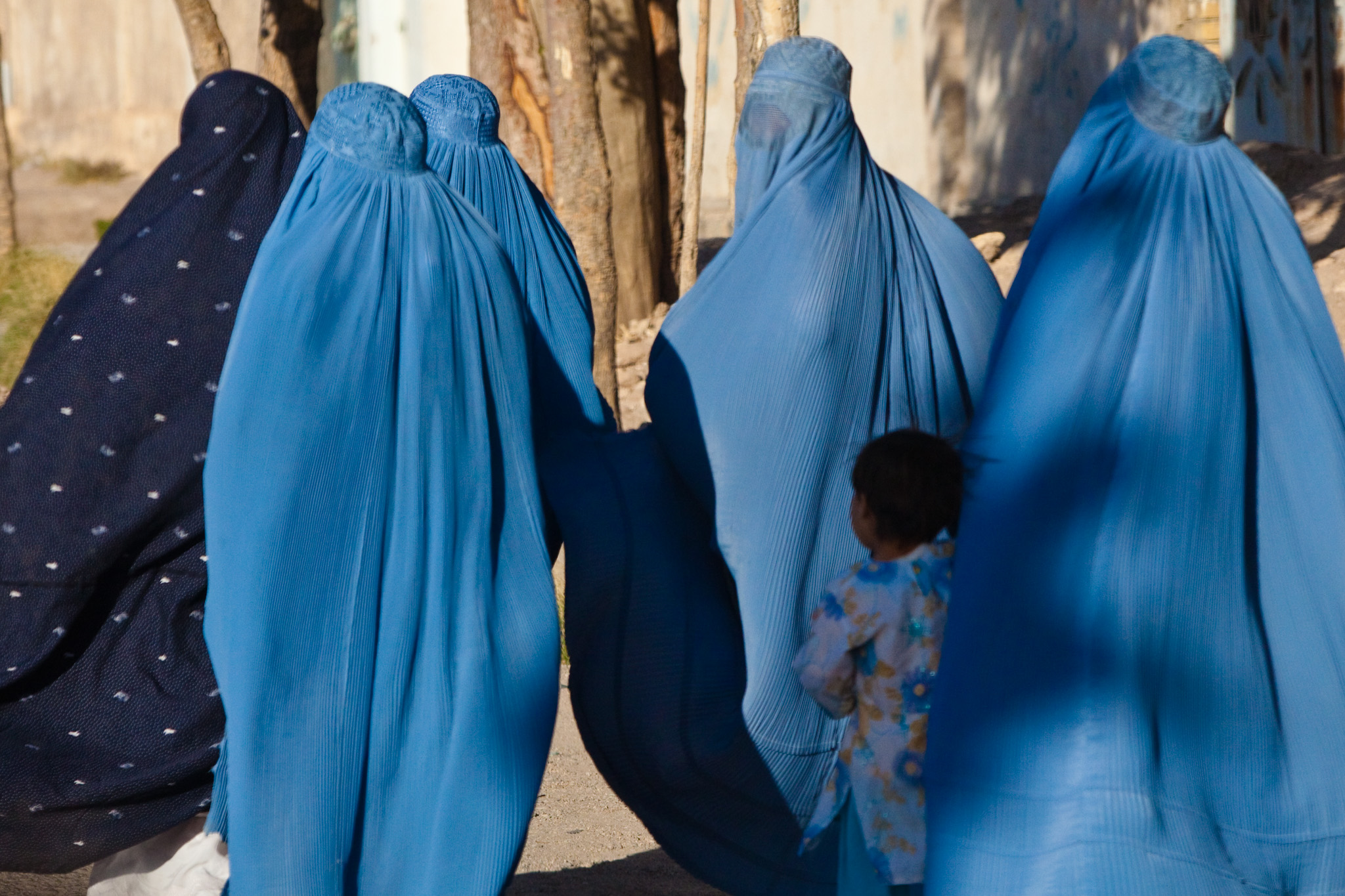
Blue Afghan burkas, known locally as chadori, (Note: Compare with chador) were identified by the Taliban as an acceptable type of required hijab.

The withdrawal of the US army and most diplomatic international presence has changed the way of life for many Afghan women. At the beginning of September 2021, the focus on a male-dominated society returned, as the new regime appointed only men for the government positions. Besides not being represented by their government, the Taliban has also altered the access to education for females. In various parts of the country, girls were taken out of high school and women were barred from universities due to reasons of "capacity". After six months without education for these Afghan women, the Taliban had promised to reopen the schools in March 2022 but retracted their statement, which resulted in a protest.

Life has changed for Afghan women as their freedom is being restricted; access to education is hindered, possibilities in employment are limited, there is lesser freedom regarding appearance and basic rights are curtailed.

==== Mental health ====
A study between August and November 2021 was completed by 214 Afghan students with a majority of 73.7% being female. Accurate studies in crisis areas like Afghanistan are difficult to conduct because it is hard to have a large number of participants and a smaller sample size weakens the results. Despite this, the research presents that 69.7% of participants have depression and 70% from PTSD due to the fall of Kabul and the crisis that came after. Women are affected more than men and the general scores are higher than those of prior studies in Afghanistan.

==== Health ====
Many women in Afghanistan have experienced gender-based violence (GBV) in their lives. Even though it was already in place before the Taliban rule, it has increased since the fall of Kabul. The Taliban have been accused of removing Afghan women from public life, which includes the political, economic and social spheres. An example of the increasing restrictions that affect female health is that women are banned from travelling for more than 72 kilometers without the presence of a mahram, a male guardian. The geographical reduction of their access to health care in combination with the fact that women cannot be examined by males aggravates the problem. The deteriorating humanitarian and economic situation increases the further risk of GBV as there are fewer help services or ways to escape the violence.

=== Anniversary ===
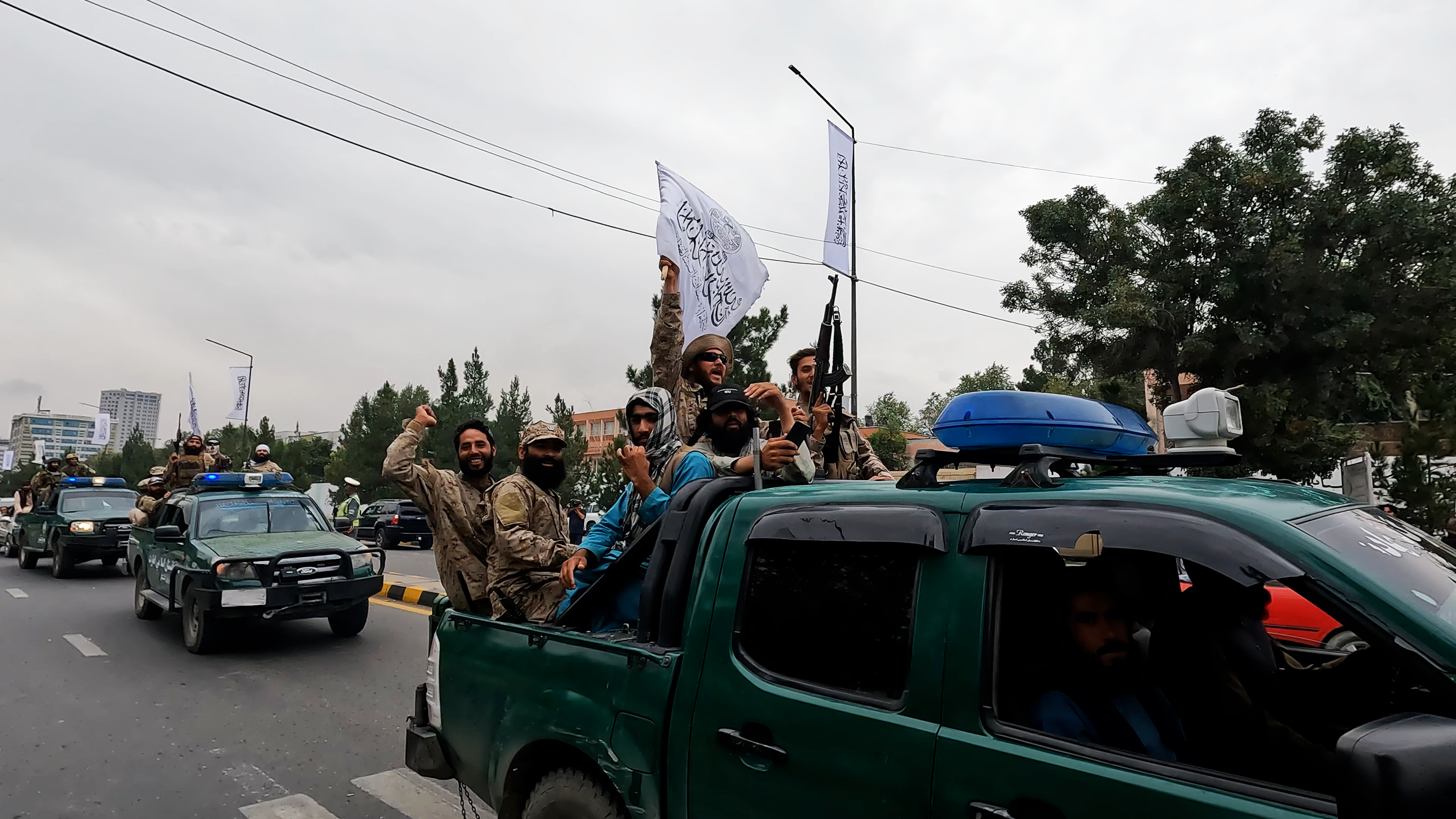
Taliban members celebrating on the anniversary of their victory in Kabul, August 2022

In 2022, 15 August was declared a national holiday known as "Victory Day" by the Taliban upon the first anniversary of the fall of Kabul.

== See also ==
- Battle of Kabul, 1929
- Battle of Kabul (1992–1996)
- Fall of Saigon, Vietnam, 1975
- Fall of Phnom Penh, Cambodia, 1975
- Fall of Mosul, Iraq, 2014
- Fall of Damascus, Syria, 2024
- Soviet withdrawal from Afghanistan
- 1842 retreat from Kabul
- Kabul International Airport
