= Mohammed Masoom Stanekzai =

Former head of National Directorate of Security

Mohammad Masoom Stanekzai
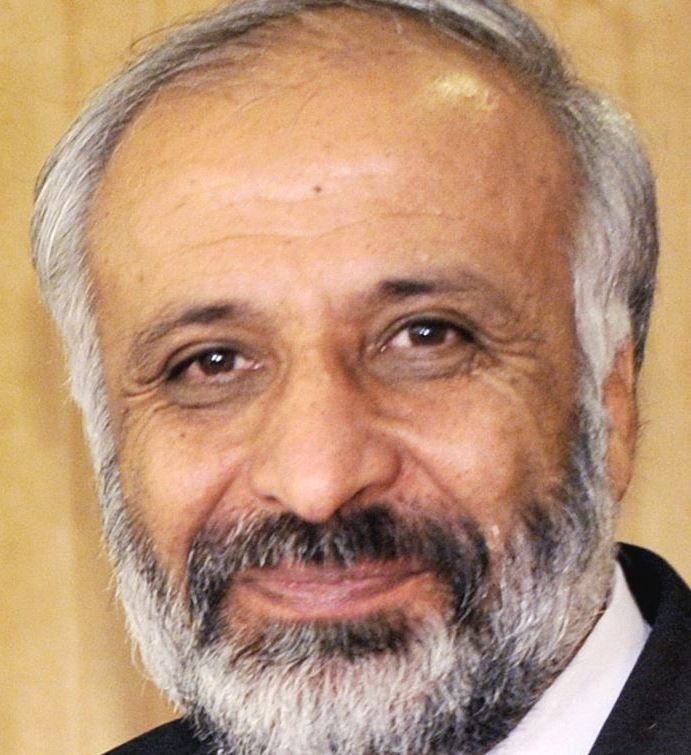

Director of the National Directorate of Security
- In office 6 May 2016 – 5 September 2019
- President: Ashraf Ghani
- Preceded by: Massoud Andarabi (acting)
- Succeeded by: Ahmad Zia Saraj

Acting Minister of Defence
- In office 24 May 2015 – 4 May 2016
- President: Ashraf Ghani
- Preceded by: Bismillah Khan Mohammadi
- Succeeded by: Abdullah Habibi

Personal details
- Born: 1958 (age 67–68) Logar Province, Kingdom of Afghanistan
- Education: Cambridge University

Military service
- Allegiance: Democratic Republic of Afghanistan; Islamic Republic of Afghanistan
- Battles/wars: Soviet Afghan war War in Afghanistan (2001–present)

Mohammed Masoom Stanekzai (Pashto: محمد معصوم ستانکزی; 1958) is a former Minister, Chief Peace Negotiator, and chief of the National Directorate of Security (NDS) of the Islamic Republic of Afghanistan. He belongs to the Stanikzai tribe of the Ghilzai Pashtuns.

He became the NDS chief in 2016. In 2019, he resigned following an extrajudicial killing of Afghan civilians by a joint US and NDS unit during a night raid in 2019.

Previously, he has served as Minister of Telecommunications and Information Technology from 2002 to 2004 and later as a security advisor for President Hamid Karzai. He has also worked as the CEO of the joint secretariat of the Afghanistan Peace and Reintegration Program in 2009.

In May 2015, he was nominated as Minister of Defense by President Ashraf Ghani. However, his was repeatedly rejected by the Wolesi Jirga (lower house). He served as acting Minister of Defense for a year through Presidential decree, one of seven incumbents in the period between 2015 and August 2021.

== Early life ==
Masoom Stanekzai was born in 1958 in the village of Mughul Khel in the Mohammad Agha District of Logar Province. He belongs to the Pashtun Stanikzai tribe and born to a middle-class family. He is the third child of Mahmood Khan, a civil servant.

=== Education ===
Stanekzai has studied in Afghanistan, Pakistan, the UK and the US. His tertiary education began with a BA at the Kabul Telecom Institute, and he is also a graduate of Kabul Military University. He earned a master's degree in business management at Preston University (Pakistan) in 2000, and a master's in engineering for sustainable development from Cambridge University (UK) in 2006. He has also undertaken academic research as a visiting fellow at the United States Institute of Peace in 2008 and 2021-23. He was named the Jennings Randolph Afghanistan Fellow at USIP in 2008-09.

Stanekzai speaks fluent Dari, Pashto and English. His research focuses on security, reconstruction and peace building in Afghanistan.

== Career ==
After graduating from high school, Stanekzai joined the Kabul Telecommunications Institute, and after that he graduated from Kabul Military University and joined the Afghan National Army (ANA). He served in the ANA for more than a decade rising to the rank of colonel during the regime of the People's Democratic Party of Afghanistan (PDPA). He fought against the Mujahideen during the Soviet-Afghan war.

In 1994, he began working at the Agency for Rehabilitation and Energy Conservation in Afghanistan (AREA), and became managing director of AREA from 1997 to 2002. From 2002 to 2004, he served as a Minister for Telecommunication and ICT in the Afghan Transitional Government, during which time he led the establishment of modern digital technology in Afghanistan including mobile phones, a fibre optic backbone, and the introduction of ICT throughout the country.

Stanekzai was Vice-Chair of the DDR Commission between 2005 and 2008, and served as CEO of the High Council for Peace and Reconciliation from 2010 to 2014.

Stanekzai served as security advisor to President Hamid Karzai, working with former President Behanuddin Rabbani. On 20 September 2011, Masoom Stanekzai was seriously injured following a suicide attack that killed Peace Council Chairman Berhanuddin Rabbani. In 2015, he was nominated as Minister of Defense by President Ashraf Ghani. However, he was one of seven Ministers and acting Ministers of Defence in the dual Presidency and Chief Executive model of government of Afghanistan over the following seven years, and his nomination was repeatedly rejected by Afghan lower house. He served as acting Minister for Defense for one year, and was then appointed as the new head of National Directorate of Security (NDS).

Stanekzai led the NDS for three years and oversaw a transformation of the organisation. He resigned in 2019, following an extrajudicial killing of four Afghan civilians during a night raid conducted by a joint US and NDS unit the city of Jalalabad in Nangarhar province. NDS officials claimed that those civilians who were killed during the raid were members of Islamic State of Iraq and the Levant (ISIS). However, locals residents and some Afghan government officials believed they were not ISIS members but innocent civilians. Local residents of Nangarhar province staged protests against the NDS. President Ashraf Ghani announced that "he had regretfully accepted the resignation of NDS chief, Mr. Stanekzai."

Stanekzai then went on to work as a senior advisor and Chief Negotiator, representing the President and Chief Executive in negotiations with the Taliban and international community. These negotiations sought to establish an agreement for the formation of a government after the election that was to occur following the withdrawal of US and other international forces in 2021. During this period, Stanekzai sought to find a middle ground and build a consensus for peace. Ultimately these negotiations failed and the Taliban staged a military overthrow of the democratic government of Afghanistan.

in 2022-23 Stanekzai undertook further research with the United States Institute of Peace, writing on lessons learned from the Afghanistan peace process, and the impact of US policy approaches in Afghanistan. (the report will be published as part of a book in late 2023).
