= Mahdi Mujahid =

Afghan Hazara militant (1988–2022)

Mawlawi Mahdi Mujahid
- مهدی مجاهد

Director of the Bamyan Intelligence Department
- In office 15 August 2021 – 21 May 2022
- Emir: Hibatullah Akhundzada
- Governor: Abdullah Sarhadi (acting)

Personal details
- Born: 1988 Hosh, Balkhab, Sar-e Pol Province, Republic of Afghanistan
- Died: 17 August 2022 (aged 33–34) Bunyad, Kohsan, Herat Province, Afghanistan
- Cause of death: Gunshot wounds

Military service
- Years of service: 2022
- Battles/wars: Afghanistan conflict; Republican insurgency in Afghanistan; Balkhab uprising †

Mahdi Mujahid (Dari: مهدی مجاهد, romanized: Mahdī Mujāhid; 1988 – 17 August 2022) was an Afghan Hazara rebel. He was formerly a Taliban commander before he defected and led around 200 Hazara fighters during the Balkhab uprising. He was killed in action on 17 August 2022.

== Early life ==
Mahdi was born in a small village called Hosh in the Balkhab District of northern Afghanistan to a religious Shia family belonging to the Hazara ethnic group. His father, Murad Mujahid, was a member of Hezbe Wahdat and he fought in the Soviet–Afghan War, which was when Murad began using "Mujahid" as a surname. Mahdi was 8 years old when the Taliban first gained control of Afghanistan in 1996. Three years later, the Taliban captured his home district of Balkhab. He fled with his family to neighboring Iran, returning to Afghanistan after the December 2001 Afghan Interim Administration had been formed.

Mahdi began attending school and seemed motivated to take over the family farm. But in his early twenties, a Hazara warlord had seized their ancestral lands. In retaliation, Mahdi and friends kidnapped the warlord's son and held him hostage, only returning him after the warlord returned the lands. That night, the warlord's forces surrounded Mahdi's home, and clashes erupted as he tried to escape. Mahdi was hospitalized and then jailed for seven years for kidnapping.

He became more religious and first came in contact with the Taliban while in prison, however, he remained a Shia Muslim and did not convert to Sunni Islam.

== Taliban career ==
In April 2020, the Taliban appointed Mahdi as the head of intelligence in Bamyan Province, and the chief of the Taliban in Sar-e Pol Province, a move which many Taliban members and the Haqqani network were opposed to for many reasons, mainly due to him being a Hazara Shia. The Taliban were accused of using Mahdi to increase their influence among Hazaras and other Shia Muslims. Mahdi was later fired from the Taliban's head of intelligence position in Bamyan after making a speech against the closure of girls' schools, and his persistent demanding of equality for Hazaras and other Shia Muslims. After being fired from his position, he left the Taliban and declared war against them.

== Anti-Taliban career ==
In 2022, Mahdi announced that he was arming fighters loyal to him which consisted of about 200 Hazara Shias. He also built a monument dedicated to himself and Abdul Ali Mazari in Balkhab, and he also turned more to his Shia Islamist and Hazara nationalist views. His forces ousted the Taliban's district governor and captured the Balkhab district. Mawlawi Ataullah, the Taliban's district governor, fled Balkhab, and Mahdi replaced him with one of his Hazara associates.

Mahdi Mujahid was supported by the NRF and Hazara politicians Muhammad Mohaqiq of HWIMA and Karim Khalili of Hezbe Wahdat, which Mahdi's father was a member of.

On 13 June 2022, Mahdi Mujahid gained full control of Balkhab district and his fighters were inflicting heavy damage on the Taliban. He was initially winning the conflict although the Taliban later outnumbered his fighters and retook Balkhab.

== Assassination attempt ==
On the morning of 25 June 2022, in the midst of the fighting between the Taliban and Mahdi's forces, Mahdi's house in the Hosh village of Balkhab district was targeted by Taliban airstrikes. Mahdi and his family survived, and none of them were injured. However, that same night, the Taliban killed Mohammad Moradi, his wife, and his daughter in Ghor Province. Moradi was a popular anti-Taliban commander. His support for Mahdi Mujahid was seen by the Hasht-e Subh as the reason for the Taliban attack on his house.

== Death ==
Mahdi Mujahid was killed on 17 August 2022 while he was trying to escape to Iran. It is unclear how he was killed. According to the locals and some Afghan media outlets, Mujahid was caught by the Taliban in the village of Bunyad in Kohsan District where he was arrested and had his identity confirmed before being executed.

Two pictures also started circulating on social media which showed Mujahid alive and in the custody of the Taliban before being executed. One picture showed a shaved Mahdi Mujahid wearing a white turban, and another one of him without the turban and surrounded by unknown men, presumably Taliban members.

However, the Taliban's Ministry of Defense had denied local reports suggesting that Mujahid was executed. Taliban officials say that Mujahid was attempting to escape to Iran when their intelligence and border security caught him by the Afghanistan–Iran border and shot him dead. Naeemul Haq Haqqani, Taliban provincial information minister, told AFP that Mujahid was “killed after a conflict” and “rumors that he was captured alive are lies”.

=== Reaction ===
Haji Muhammad Mohaqiq, a prominent ethnic Hazara leader who had strongly supported Mahdi through his conflict with the Taliban, condemned the killing of Mahdi Mujahid. He stated that "cold-bloodedly executing a person while he was not taken from war and was an unarmed traveler is against the religious teachings and is a war crime according to the international law."
