= National Directorate of Security =

Former national intelligence and security service of Afghanistan

- Pashto: د ملي امنیت لوی ریاست; Dari: ریاست عمومی امنیت ملی
- Seal of the National Directorate of Security

Agency overview
- Formed: 2002; 24 years ago
- Preceding agency: WAD
- Dissolved: 2021; 5 years ago
- Superseding agency: General Directorate of Intelligence (GDI)
- Headquarters: Kabul, Islamic Republic of Afghanistan
- Employees: Classified, estimated to have 15,000 to 30,000 agents.
- Annual budget: Classified
- Agency executive: Ahmad Zia Saraj, Director
- Website: Official twitter

The National Directorate of Security (NDS; Pashto: د ملي امنیت لوی ریاست; Dari: ریاست عمومی امنیت ملی) was the national intelligence and security service of the Islamic Republic of Afghanistan. The headquarters of the NDS was in Kabul, and it had field offices and training facilities in all 34 provinces of Afghanistan. The NDS was part of the Afghan National Security Forces (ANSF).

The NDS was mandated to investigate cases and incidents that affect Afghan national security and to fight terrorism. According to the Law on Crimes against Internal and External Security of the Democratic Republic of Afghanistan, the agency was tasked to investigate cases involving "national treason, espionage, terrorism, sabotage, propaganda against the Government, war propaganda, assisting enemy forces, and organised activity against internal and external security".

As the primary intelligence organ of Afghanistan, the NDS shared information about regional terrorism and major crimes with the Afghan ministries and provincial governors.

Its activities were regulated according to the National Security Law. The agency was dissolved in 2021 after the war in Afghanistan (2001–2021).

== History ==
The National Directorate of Security was founded as the primary domestic and foreign intelligence agency of the Islamic Republic of Afghanistan in 2002, and is considered the successor to KHAD, which was the previous intelligence organization before the Afghan Civil War (1992–2001). The CIA was responsible for assisting the Afghan government to establish the NDS.

On January 16, 2013, the Taliban targeted the NDS compound in Kabul in a suicide bombing, followed by small arms fire. In 2016, the NDS compound in Kabul was targeted in a bombing attack at the city's Puli Mahmood Khan neighborhood. The Taliban claimed responsibility for the attack.

On February 18, 2018, the NDS suffered a rare attack from Taliban sympathizers when four of its own agents attacked an NDS facility in Gerishk District. On March 18, 2018, a joint command made up of NDS' Quick Reaction Forces (QRF) and Afghan Army Special Forces units were formed.

After the fall of Kabul to Taliban fighters, many NDS agents and other personnel fled to India, Tajikistan and Uzbekistan in order to hide. The NDS' 01 unit reportedly made a deal with the United States to assist with security at Hamid Karzai International Airport in exchange for being airlifted out of Afghanistan. Human Rights Watch reported that the Taliban have been engaged to look for NDS agents hiding in Afghanistan.

As of August 20, 2021, the NDS' last director Ahmad Saraj is reportedly hiding from the Taliban in London. On October 26, 2021, the Taliban announced the establishment of the General Directorate of Intelligence (GDI), replacing the NDS.

On January 7, 2022, female NDS agents reported that they're in danger of being targeted by the Taliban a year after the Taliban regained control of Afghanistan. On October-December 2022, it was reported that ex-NDS agents were being secretly recruited to assist in Russia's fight in Ukraine. Iran and Wagner contractors were said to be involved in convincing them to head to Ukraine. They were offered $1,500 to $2,000 a month and $3,000 for every child below 18 with a promise of Russian citizenship. Around 270 ex-NDS personnel and their immediate families were said to have accepted the offer.

There are reports of some NDS agents joining up with ISIS-K due to being hunted by the Taliban in 2022 and not being able to escape Afghanistan safely. A letter from ex-NDS personnel in November 2021 denies supposed allegations that they have joined forces with ISIS-K.

In August 2023, surviving NDS Zero unit operators in the U.S. denied that they were ordered to shoot at civilians as they were strictly instructed by CIA officers not to do so while trained to follow all rules of war. Ex-ZU officer Nasir Andar reported that some of his colleagues committed suicide due to the long bureaucratic process where their expedited immigration assistance has been very long.

During a hearing at the House of Commons of the United Kingdom in February 2024 on assisting ex-Afghan SOF relocate to the UK, Sir David Davis testified that BOST 170 operators are among the most loyal and supportive of British troops during their deployments in Afghanistan, which is the reason why the Taliban has long sought to hunt those who weren't able to leave during the 2021 capture of Kabul.

=== Known operations ===
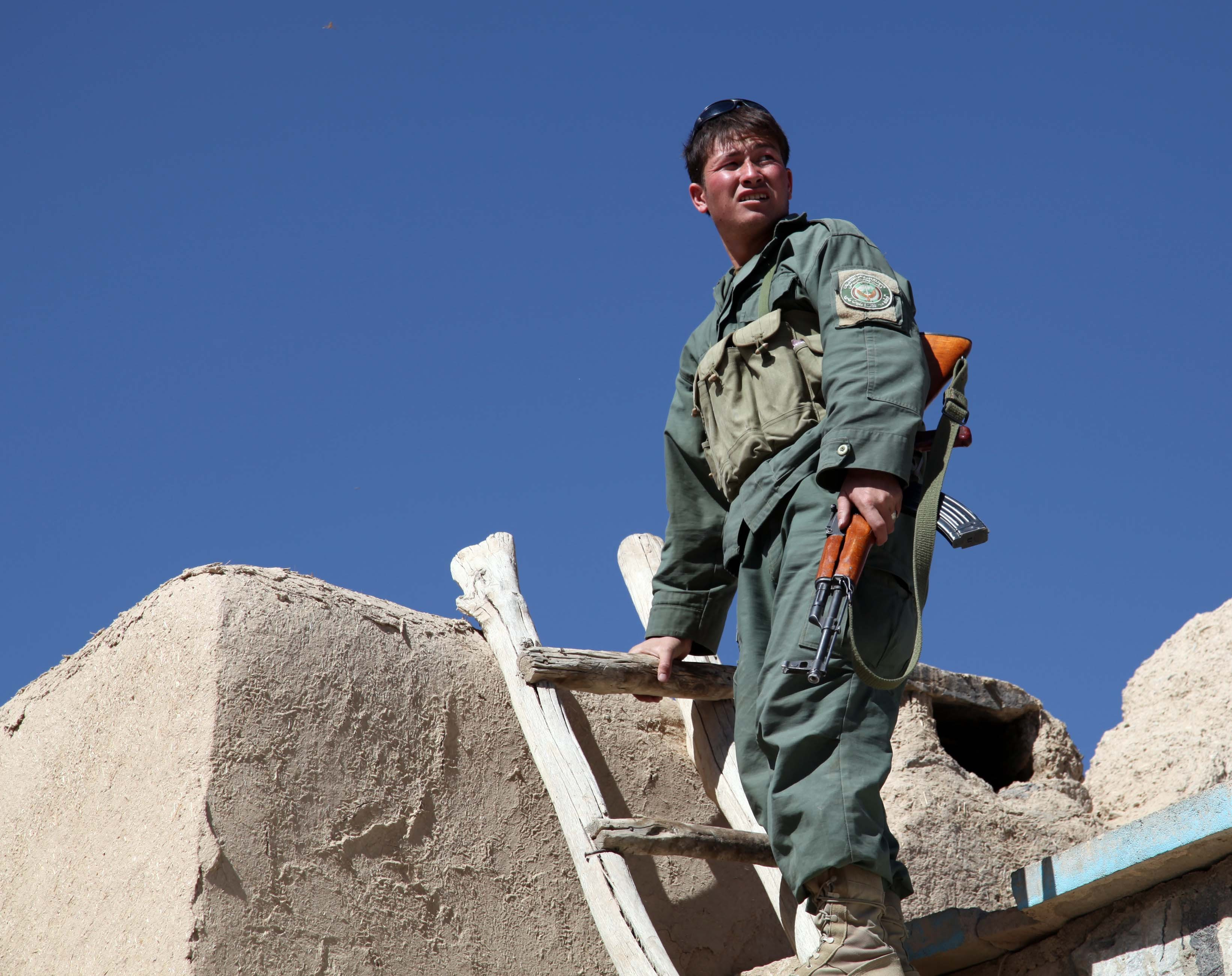
NDS soldier conducting a search in the village of Salar, Wardak province during Operation Talon Spinzar in October 2010

After the ouster of the Taliban in 2002, the NDS warned ISI about exiled militant commanders and al-Qaeda operatives hiding in Pakistan. In early 2006, intelligence gathered from NDS detainees suggested Osama bin Laden resided in the western Pakistan town of Mansehra. A classified NDS paper completed in May, titled "Strategy of the Taliban," claimed ISI and Saudi Arabia restarted active support for the Taliban in 2005. Pakistan's military leadership sought to weaken and delegitimize Hamid Karzai's government, in order to prevent an alliance between Afghanistan and India.

In 2007, NDS used arrests and interrogations to discover the majority of suicide bombings in Afghanistan originated among Pashtuns from Pakistan's Federally Administered Tribal Areas.

In 2011, BOST 170 operators worked with Task Force Helmand’s Brigade Reconnaissance Force (BRF) in Khosh Kowa to search and seize ammonium nitrate. In 2012, BOST 170 operators were deployed in Khoshkaba area, Lahkar Gah to seize ammonium nitrate and TNT explosives.

In October 2013, the US inadvertently discovered a covert relationship between the NDS and the Pakistani Taliban (the Pakistani Taliban being a separate, but ideologically aligned organization from the Afghan Taliban). During a raid on an Afghan convoy, US Special Forces intercepted a senior Pakistani Taliban militant, Latif Mehsud, being escorted to Kabul. Initially, the Afghan government claimed he was a peace convoy, but later admitted that the plan was to support the Pakistani Taliban as retaliation against Pakistan for backing the Afghan Taliban. When confronted about the incident, Afghan officials stated that their objective was to persuade Pakistan's ISI to cease supporting Afghan insurgents by having the NDS provide similar assistance to insurgents in western Pakistan.

During the April 2014 Afghan Presidential Election, the NDS, under Rahmatullah Nabil, collected thousands of signals intelligence indicating Ashraf Ghani's allies organized massive electoral fraud.

In April 2015, the NDS seized an arms cache in Baghkak village, Saydabad District and detained two suspected insurgents.

On May 30, 2015, the NDS worked with the Afghan Army to seize 16 tons of explosives meant for a bombing attack in Kabul.

The NDS has had a degree of success, including capturing Maulvi Faizullah, a notable Taliban leader, and foiling an assassination attempt against Abdul Rashid Dostum in 2014.

The NDS captured Aslam Farooqi, the chief of ISIS-K, on April 4, 2020. Farooqi was captured in a NDS special forces raid. On December 4, 2020, the NDS busted a 10-man cell consisting of Chinese nationals linked to the Ministry of State Security, who were subsequently arrested for trying to build up connections to the Haqqani Network. The Research and Analysis Wing provided tips to the NDS, which led to the arrest.

=== Controversies ===
On December 26, 2009, a report was filed by HRW regarding the suspicious death of Abdul Basir, who was said to be beaten while in custody despite statements from the NDS that he tried to kill himself.

On July 9, 2011, an off-duty NDS agent in Panjshir shot a contractor and a NATO soldier.

During the airlift operations in Kabul after the capital was captured by the Taliban, NDS 01 operators were accused of harassing Afghans of Hazara origin.

== Organization ==
The NDS was part of the Afghan National Security Forces (ANSF) and reported directly to the Office of the President. Some NDS personnel were seconded to the Kta Khas alongside Afghan police officers.

NDS-related facilities were found all over Afghanistan, including in Herat, Kabul, Kandahar, Khost and Laghman.

The agency was divided into departments and units that were known by numbers. Around 30 departments were known to be operational before it became defunct.

- Number 018 - Internal Security (Formerly Number 034 as of 2011)
- Number 040 - Investigations (Formerly Number 017 as of 2011)
- Number 124 (Note: It's sometimes known as Number 241.) - Counter-Terrorism (Formerly Number 090 as of 2011)
  - BOST 170 - NDS' counterterrorism unit. Created in 2008 with British assistance.
- D011 - A secretive unit formed with GCHQ mentorship/assistance to monitor electronic communications. As of 2022, 78 members were still hiding from the Taliban in Afghanistan.
- Division 915 (Shamshad) - A secretive unit formed with DGSE mentorship/assistance.
- Special Forces - Divided to four regional operational areas. They're known to have close working relationships with the CIA.
- National Strike Unit or Zero Units - Black ops unit of the NDS. It consists of an intelligence, analysis and operational unit.
- Quick Reaction Force
- People's Uprising Forces
- Sangorian - The NDS commands the militia after it was raised in 2016. They were involved in the 2021 Taliban offensive.

=== NSU Area of Responsibility ===
NDS Unit	Area of Responsibility
NDS 01	Central region (Kabul, Parwan, Wardak, Logar)
NDS 02	Eastern region (Nangahar)
NDS 03 (Note: Said to be known as the Kandahar Strike Force or KSF)	Southern region (Kandahar)
NDS 04	Northeast (Nuristan, Kunar)

== Directors and deputy heads ==
- Mohammad Qasim Fahim (April 1992 – October 2001)
- Muhammad Arif Sarwari (October 2001 – February 2004)
- Amrullah Saleh (February 2004 – June 2010)
- Ibrahim Spinzada (June 2010 – July 2010) Acting
- Rahmatullah Nabil (July 2010 – September 2012), Hasamudin Hasam (deputy 2011)
- Asadullah Khalid (September 2012 – August 2013)
- Rahmatullah Nabil (August 2013 – December 2015)
- Mohammed Masoom Stanekzai (May 2016 – September 2019)
- Ahmad Zia Saraj (September 2019 – August 2021)

== Criticism ==
In 2015, the NDS was criticized for allowing its special forces personnel to act as bodyguards for some Afghan politicians, but NDS officials justified their role as a security precaution.

In 2018, the agency was criticized for deploying inexperienced officers to collect intelligence related to national security matters. This was a product of massive failures to cooperate with the other parts of the government.

The agency has been accused of human rights violations against detainees, including children.
