= Ahmad Zia Saraj =

Former Director General of Afghan intelligence (NDS), Politician, University Professor

- احمد ضیاء سراج
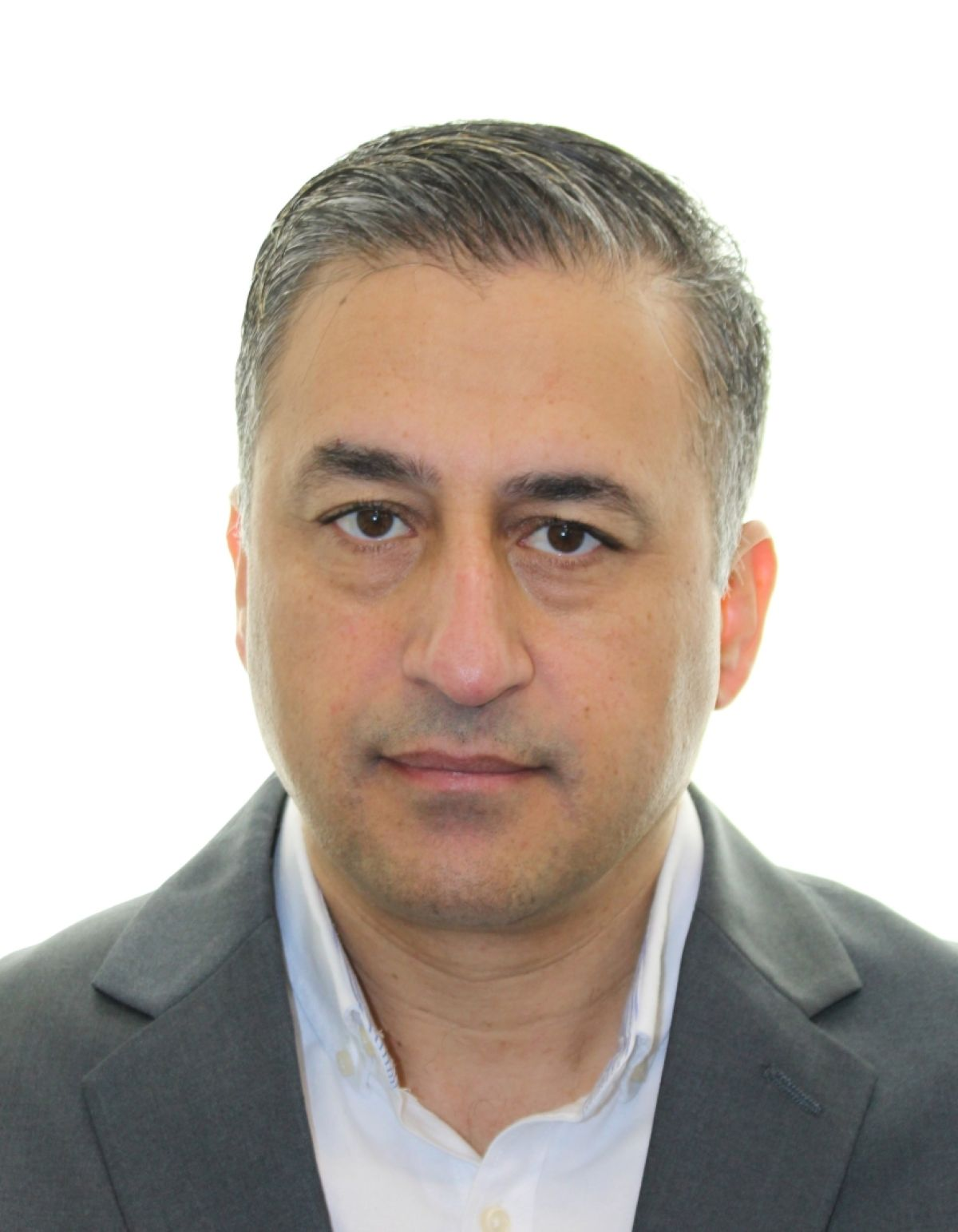

Director General of NDS
- In office 09/09/2019–15/08/2021
- President: Ashraf Ghani
- Preceded by: Mohammed Masoom Stanekzai

Deputy Director General for Operations NDS
- Incumbent
- Assumed office 2018- 09/09/2019

Chief of Counter Terrorism Department NDS
- In office 2016–2018

Personal details
- Born: 11 March 1978 (age 48) Kabul Province, Afghanistan
- Education: Master of defence studies; Master of strategic management and leadership
- Alma mater: King's College London; Chartered Management Institute
- Occupation: Professor at the King's College London
- Profession: Politician; Intelligence; Military

Military service
- Allegiance: Islamic Republic of Afghanistan
- Rank: Lieutenant General

Ahmad Zia Saraj (born March 11, 1978) was the last Director General of the National Directorate of Security from 2019 to 2021, until the collapse of the Islamic Republic. He served as the Deputy Director General, chief of counter terrorism department, deputy chief of foreign intelligence & counterintelligence and some other key positions in NDS respectively over 20 years after the fall of Taliban in 2001. He has been serving as visiting professor in the war studies department of the King's College London University since early 2023.

== Early life ==
Ahmad Zia Saraj was born on March 11, 1978, in Kabul, Afghanistan, to a family with a military background. His father was a Brigadier General in the Afghan army. In early 2002, Ahmad Zia Saraj joined the National Directorate of Security (NDS) of the Islamic Republic of Afghanistan. Over two decades, he served in various stages and roles within the organization until the collapse of the Islamic Republic of Afghanistan.

== Education ==
Ahmad Zia Saraj completed his high school graduation at Amani High School in Kabul and earned a level 7 degree (master's) in strategic management and leadership from the Chartered Management Institute in the United Kingdom. In 2012, he attended the Advanced Command and Staff Course at Shrivenham, followed by obtaining a master's degree in defense studies from King’s College London in 2013. Since 2023, Ahmad Zia Saraj has been a visiting professor at the school.

== Career ==
Ahmad Zia Saraj joined the National Directorate of Security in early 2002 and held various roles within the organization. Beginning as a liaison officer, he progressed to become the Chief of NDS Liaison Department. Subsequently, he assumed positions such as Deputy Chief of Counterintelligence and Foreign Intelligence, followed by his appointment as the Chief of the Counter Terrorism Department. Later, Saraj served as the Deputy Director General for Operations.

On September 9, 2019, he appointed as the Acting Director of NDS, and introduced as the nominee of that position by the Afghan government for the Afghan National Assembly. On November 30, 2020, he garnered 220 votes from people representatives, officially becoming the General Director of the National Directorate of Security in the Islamic Republic of Afghanistan. He spent two decades at the NDS until the collapse of the Islamic Republic of Afghanistan on August 15, 2021.

== Achievements ==
Under the leadership of Ahmad Zia Saraj, the Afghanistan National Directorate of Security (NDS) embarked on a new phase in the fight against internal and international terrorism. During his tenure, the NDS successfully apprehended or neutralized numerous individuals responsible for suicide and terrorist attacks in Afghanistan. These included the perpetrators of the attacks on the Intercontinental Hotel in Kabul, the motor bomb attack on the German Embassy in Kabul and terror attack on Kabul University.

Notably, under Ahmad Zia Saraj's command, the NDS made significant strides against the Islamic State Khorasan Province (ISK). Key figures like Abdullah Orakzai AKA Aslam Farooqi and Abu Omar Kunari, along with 400 other ISK members, were arrested, leading to a substantial disruption in ISK's leadership structure. The NDS, during this period, also targeted and apprehended many prominent Taliban members, including governors, significantly impacting the Taliban's operational capabilities. Moreover, the NDS played a crucial role in dismantling various financial networks associated with the Taliban. Overall, Ahmad Zia Saraj's leadership marked a period of notable achievements in countering terrorism and insurgency in Afghanistan.

== Articles, Interviews and Analysis ==
-Over-the-horizon counterterrorism does not work. It’s time for a new approach.
-Afghanistan Is a 'Jihadi Utopia' Again
-Former Afghan Intelligence Chief Sees “Jihadist Utopia” Since U.S. Withdrawal
−How al-Qaeda has found a foothold again in Taliban-controlled Afghanistan
–I warned the CIA about Afghanistan’s collapse — and was ignored’ Biden only enflamed the situation
–Ex-intelligence chief Saraj warns of extremism in Pakistan’s madrasas
–“Over the Horizon” Counterterrorism Myths
–A View from the CT Foxhole: Ahmad Zia Saraj, Former General Director of the National Directorate of Security of the Islamic Republic of Afghanistan
-𝐀𝐟𝐠𝐡𝐚𝐧𝐢𝐬𝐭𝐚𝐧 𝐓𝐡𝐫𝐞𝐚𝐭 𝐀𝐬𝐬𝐞𝐬𝐬𝐦𝐞𝐧𝐭
-Why Al Qaeda Refuses to Die
-Speech on Farsi Action Foundation
-Talks, Deception, and Terror: The Taliban Subsumed Under Al Qaeda’s Strategic Umbrella
-‘Shameless’ Taliban enlist Russian help in repairing military hardware left by fleeing Soviets
-'Not your fathers Afghanistan': Has the West taken its eye off the al-Qaeda ball?
-پیامد های بازگشت طالبان به افغانستان و منطقه
-The Beginning of the End of Taliban 2.0 in Afghanistan
–رازهای ناگفته سقوط نظام جمهوری در افغانستان؛ احمد ضیا سراج – به عبارت دیگر
–احمد ضیا سراج: به رئیس آی‌اس‌آی پاکستان گفتم دوستی‌ اسلام‌آباد و طالبان یک سال دوام نمی‌کند
–نوشته اختصاصی سراج؛ چرا توافقنامه دوحه سند تسلیمی طالبان به امریکا است؟
–پیامدهای بازگشت طالبان؛ "این آتش‌فشان خفته روزی فوران خواهد کرد"
–اقتصاد مواد مخدر و جرایم سازمان‌یافته، برای چرخش ماشین جنگی تروریسم در افغانستان و منطقه
–فناوری در خدمت هراس‌افگنی فرامرزی؛ تروریست‌هایی که پهپاد دارند و ارز دیجیتال مصرف می‌کنند
–بستر نیروی انسانی تروریسم طالبان؛ 'پدران را به کشتن دادند حالا چشم به پسران‌شان دوخته‌اند'
–نقش مدارس دینی در افراط و تروریسم؛ 'یک میلیون طالب دیگر دارند آماده‌ می‌شوند'
–مهارت‌های ویرانگر تروریست‌ها در افغانستان؛ سازندگان بمب برای همیشه بیکار نخواهند نشست
–تروریسم بین‌المللی در قلمرو طالبان؛ چند گروه تروریستی در افغانستان حضور دارد؟
–پیامدهای بازگشت طالبان به افغانستان و منطقه
–احمدضیا سراج: القاعده از افغانستان حمله نمی‌کند، حملات را از این کشور رهبری می‌کند
–رئيس پیشین امنیت ملی: بازگشت طالبان به قدرت به همه گروه‌های تروریستی الهام‌ بخش بود
-گروهای فعال دهشت افگن (تروریستی) تحت حاکمیت طالبان در افغانستان
-سراج: هزینه سقوط افغانستان را منطقه خواهد پرداخت
-احمد ضیا سراج حملات پهپادی طالبان به پاکستان را غیرموثر خواند و گفت این اقدامات با هدف «فریب افکار عامه» و تبلیغات راه‌اندازی شده است.
-آغاز پایان دور دوم حاکمیت طالبان
