= Balkhab uprising =

Hazara rebellion against Taliban in summer 2022

- Part of the Republican insurgency and the Islamic State–Taliban conflict during the Afghan conflict and the war on terror
| Date | 23 June 2022 – 17 August 2022 (1 month, 3 weeks and 4 days) |
| Location | Balkhab, Sar-e Pol, Afghanistan |
| Result | Afghan government victory: Mahdi Mujahid killed; War crimes against the local civilians by the Taliban |

Belligerents
| Afghanistan (Islamic State) ISIS–K | Mahdi Mujahid's forces Supported by: National Resistance Front of Afghanistan; HWIMA; Hezbe Wahdat |

Commanders and leaders
| Fasihuddin Fitrat | Mahdi Mujahid † |

Units involved
| Taliban; 203 Mansoori Corps; Badri 313 Battalion | Mahdi Mujahid's forces; Local Hazara volunteers; Local Shia volunteers; Liwa Fatemiyoun veterans; Former Afghan National Security Forces members; Former Afghan National Army members; Former Afghan National Police members |

Strength
| 8,000–12,000 | 200 |

Casualties and losses
| Heavy | Heavy: 8 captured prisoners executed |
- Civilian casualties: Thousands of families displaced 23–150 civilians killed

The Balkhab uprising was a Hazara rebellion in Balkhab district, Sar-e Pol province, Afghanistan against the Taliban. Led by Mahdi Mujahid, the uprising began on 23 June 2022 after Mahdi Mujahid's forces captured Balkhab district.

Initially, the Taliban did not take Mahdi Mujahid seriously when he declared war against them. After he gathered his own fighters and quickly took control of his native Balkhab district, the Taliban deployed troops and widely outnumbered Mahdi and his militants.

== Background ==
Tensions between the Taliban and Mahdi Mujahid, their only Hazara Shia commander, began following the Taliban takeover of Afghanistan when their leadership tried to gain greater control over coal mining in Balkhab.

The Taliban's limit was when he began publicly criticizing them for their treatment of Hazaras and other Shia Muslims, and the closure of girls schools. This led to the Taliban removing him as their head of intelligence in Bamyan province.

== War ==
After being expelled as the head of intelligence, Mahdi Mujahid left the Taliban and then declared war on them. Mahdi Mujahid quickly captured Balkhab district, removed the Taliban district governor and replaced him with a Shia Hazara from within his forces. After capturing Balkhab, Mahdi Mujahid said that no one could take the district from the Hazaras by force. The Taliban initially gathered an estimated 500 fighters and planned to capture Mahdi from two directions, one coming from Dara-i Sufi Bala District in Samangan Province and one coming from Yakawlang District in Bamyan Province.

The Taliban had also asked its members from the ethnic Uzbek community in Jowzjan and Faryab provinces led by Qari Salahuddin Ayubi to provide at least 200 fighters to help capture Mahdi, but they refused.

As of 13 June 2022, the entire Balkhab District was controlled by Mahdi Mujahid's forces.

Many people including ordinary civilians, IRA Armed Forces veterans, and Liwa Fatemiyoun fighters joined under Mahdi's command.

Sources state ISIS-K was being used in Balkhab, they were deployed in Kotal Regi of the Balkhab district and carried out an attack from the district.

On 23 June 2022, the Taliban attempted to take Balkhab, although they failed to even enter it due to the heavy resistance. In an official Tweet, Sebghat Ahmadi, an NRF spokesman, said that "today at 7 am, the Taliban tried attacking the brave and justice-seeking people of Balkhab from the Qom Kotal Sancharak route". According to locals, the Taliban sent troops to Balkhab from various directions to capture Mahdi Mujahid and defeat his forces. Mahdi Mujahid stated that his forces repelled two attacks by the Taliban on 23 June and one attack on the morning of 24 June and that they had killed a significant amount of Taliban fighters. Muhammad Mohaqiq, a Hazara politician, supported Mahdi and warned the Taliban that an attack on Mahdi Mujahid "would mean a war with the Hazaras".

The two sides engaged in battles in the Dezdan Valley, Dozdan Dara, Qom Kotal and Ab-e Kalan areas, and dozens of deaths and injuries were reported, with the Taliban having more losses. A source close to Mahdi Mujahid claimed that Taliban forces had withdrawn from several fronts after being overpowered by Mahdi's forces.

On 25 June, the Taliban launched an airstrike at the home of Mahdi Mujahid, although neither he nor his family was injured or killed.

On 3 July, the Taliban executed nine of Mahdi Mujahid's fighters who had surrendered. The Taliban fighters also committed atrocities against the civilians in Balkhab. On 6 July, the Taliban deployed almost 8,000 fighters and surrounded all of Balkhab district and banned anyone from leaving or entering. The Taliban also cut off all internet in Balkhab. Mahdi Mujahid urged his fighters to not lose hope and to fight hard against the Taliban.

Karim Khalili, another Hazara politician and leader of Hezbe Wahdat, criticized the Taliban for their treatment of the Balkhab civilians. He wrote that "In this war, there are clear signs of crimes against humanity; Civilians have been directly and intentionally attacked, people's houses and properties have been looted. In addition, the communication and networks of the region have been cut off and the transportation routes to provide food for the people have been cut off completely."

Sometime around early July, the Taliban captured Golwarz village near Bakhlab as part of their campaign against the rebels. Several war crimes were reportedly committed by the Taliban against the mostly Hazara population throughout the campaign, causing refugees to flee to the neighboring provinces.

The conflict ended with a Taliban victory and the death of Mahdi Mujahid in the town of Kohsan, close to the Iranian border.

== War crimes and human rights abuses ==
In the rural areas around Balkhab district, the Taliban committed a series of war crimes against the Shia Hazara population during the conflict. On 29 June 2022, the Afghan Independent Human Rights Commission (AIHRC) stated that the Taliban had executed civilians and prisoners of war, set fire to civilians' homes, displaced civilians, and bombed civilian infrastructure. AIHRC classified the Taliban's actions as constituting war crimes. As of 1 July, 23 civilians killed by the Taliban had been identified, and 29 remained unidentified, according to Rukhshana Media. On 2 July, Hasht-e Subh estimated that 150 civilians had been killed by the Taliban and that some had been tortured. An estimated 27,000 locals were also displaced.

=== Relief ===
Ayatollah Sistani sent about 1,000 packages of food and other basic needs to the displaced Hazaras, and the Baba Mazari Foundation sent about 80 packages.
