= Balkhab River =

River in Afghanistan

Balkhab is a river in Sar-e Pol Province, Afghanistan.
