= Basej-e Milli =

Political party in Afghanistan

Afghanistan Green Trend روند سبز افغانستان
- Leader: Amrullah Saleh
- Founder: Amrullah Saleh
- Founded: 2010
- Military wing: Green Unit
- Ideology: Afghan nationalism; Democratism; Reformism; Anti-Taliban
- Political position: Centre
- National affiliation: National Resistance Front (2021-present)
- Colours: Green
- Wars: Afghan conflict; Republican insurgency in Afghanistan

Website
- afgreentrend.org (formerly green-trend.com)

Basej-e Milli (Dari: بسيج ملی, lit. 'National Movement'), alternatively called Rawand-e Sabz-e Afghanistan (Dari: روند سبز افغانستان, lit. 'Afghanistan Green Trend'), is an anti-Taliban, Afghan nationalist, and pro-democracy political party in Afghanistan. It is currently active as a militant political movement actively engaged in the Republican insurgency in Afghanistan. It was founded by former Afghan intelligence chief Amrullah Saleh.

== History ==
Basej-e Milli started as a grassroots movement when Saleh visited cities and small towns in several Afghan provinces talking about his political beliefs in favour of democracy and reform but strongly opposing the Taliban.

== Activities against the Taliban ==
=== 2011 ===
In May 2011, more than 100,000 of Saleh's followers took part in an anti-Taliban demonstration in the capital Kabul.

=== 2021 ===
On 19 August 2021, small protests consisting of women were reported in Kabul, demanding equal rights for women.

Larger protests emerged in eastern Pashtun-inhabited cities the following day. On 18 August, the Taliban opened fire on demonstrators in Jalalabad, killing 3 and wounding more than a dozen. The Taliban had promised not to be brutal in the way they rule. Witnesses said the deaths happened when local residents tried to install Afghanistan's tricolour at a square in Jalalabad. There were also reports of people trying to plant the tricolour in the eastern cities of Khost and Asadabad.

On 15 August 2021, former first vice president Amrullah Saleh, citing provisions of the 2004 Constitution, declared himself the caretaker president of Afghanistan and announced the republican resistance against the Taliban. Saleh's claim to the presidency was endorsed by Ahmad Massoud, as well as by former Afghan Minister of Defence Bismillah Mohammadi, and the Afghan embassy in Tajikistan including its ambassador Mohammad Zahir Aghbar.

The next day, 19 August, Afghan Independence Day, protests were reported as spreading to more cities, including large separate protests in Kabul, with 200 people gathered in one demonstration before it was broken up by force by the Taliban. Later on the 19th, some outlets reported that the protests in Kabul had swelled to thousands of protesters. There were multiple reports of the Taliban flag being torn down and replaced by the flag of the Islamic Republic of Afghanistan, and protesters were reported as flying the latter flag. Several protesters were reported killed after they were fired upon while they were waving national flags during Afghan Independence Day in Asadabad, where "hundreds of people" were described as joining the protest. In Kabul on the 19th, a procession of cars and people carried a long Afghan tricolor in a symbol of defiance. In Khost Province on the 19th, the Taliban violently broke up another protest, and declared a 24-hour curfew; meanwhile, in Nangarhar Province, a video was posted showing a bleeding protester with a gunshot wound being carried away.

Amrullah Saleh, formerly the vice president and the declared acting "caretaker" President of Afghanistan by the National Resistance Front per the Afghan constitution in the event of the flight abroad of former President Ashraf Ghani, saluted protesters "who carry the national flag and thus stand for dignity of the nation" on 19 August. However, the priority of the US is still geared towards securing the perimeter of the airport, as well as raising the number of evacuees out of the capital Kabul, Pentagon officials disclosed.

=== 2024 ===
In April 2024, Green Trend members exposed the identities of GDI agents/officials.

== See also ==
- Basij
- The Student Basij
