= Dost Muhammad Khan (colonel) =

Afghan military officer (c. 1894–1992)

Colonel Dost Muhammad Khan دوست محمد خان
- دوست محمد خان
- Born: 1894; Bazarak, Panjshir Province, Afghanistan
- Died: 1992 (aged 97–98); Islamabad, Pakistan
- Burial place: Peshawar, Pakistan
- Children: Ahmad Shah Massoud; Ahmad Wali Massoud; Ahmad Zia Massoud
- Relatives: Ahmad Massoud (grandson)
- Military career
- Allegiance: Royal Afghan Army
- Rank: Colonel

Dost Muhammad Khan (Note: Persian: دوست محمد خان) (c. 1894 – 1992) was an Afghan military officer who served as a colonel in the Royal Afghan Army under King Zahir Shah. He was the father of the military commander Ahmad Shah Massoud and grandfather of NRF leader Ahmad Massoud.

== Biography ==
Dost Muhammad Khan was born in c. 1894 in Bazarak, Panjshir Province, Afghanistan, to a Tajik family of the Sarkarda clan. His father, Muhammad Yahya Khan, was an Afghan military officer who fought under King Amanullah Khan in the Third Anglo-Afghan War against British India. Dost Mohammad Khan's wife, Bibi Khurshid, was described as a "modern-minded" woman who taught herself to read and write and was determined to educate her daughters alongside her sons.

After completing his military education, Dost Muhammad Khan served as colonel under King Zahir Shah. He later moved to Herat, where he served as chief of police. Afterward, Khan was dispatched to Kabul and the family moved there. Following the Soviet–Afghan War, he migrated to Pakistan and spent around twelve years there. Khan died in an accident in 1371 SH (1992) in Islamabad at the age of 98. He was buried in Peshawar, North-West Frontier Province, Pakistan.

== Sources ==
- Gall, Sandy (2021). Afghan Napoleon: The Life of Ahmad Shah Massoud. London: Haus Publishing. ISBN 978-1-913368-22-7.
