= Qadam Shah Shahim =

Afghan senior army officer

- قدم‌شاه شهیم
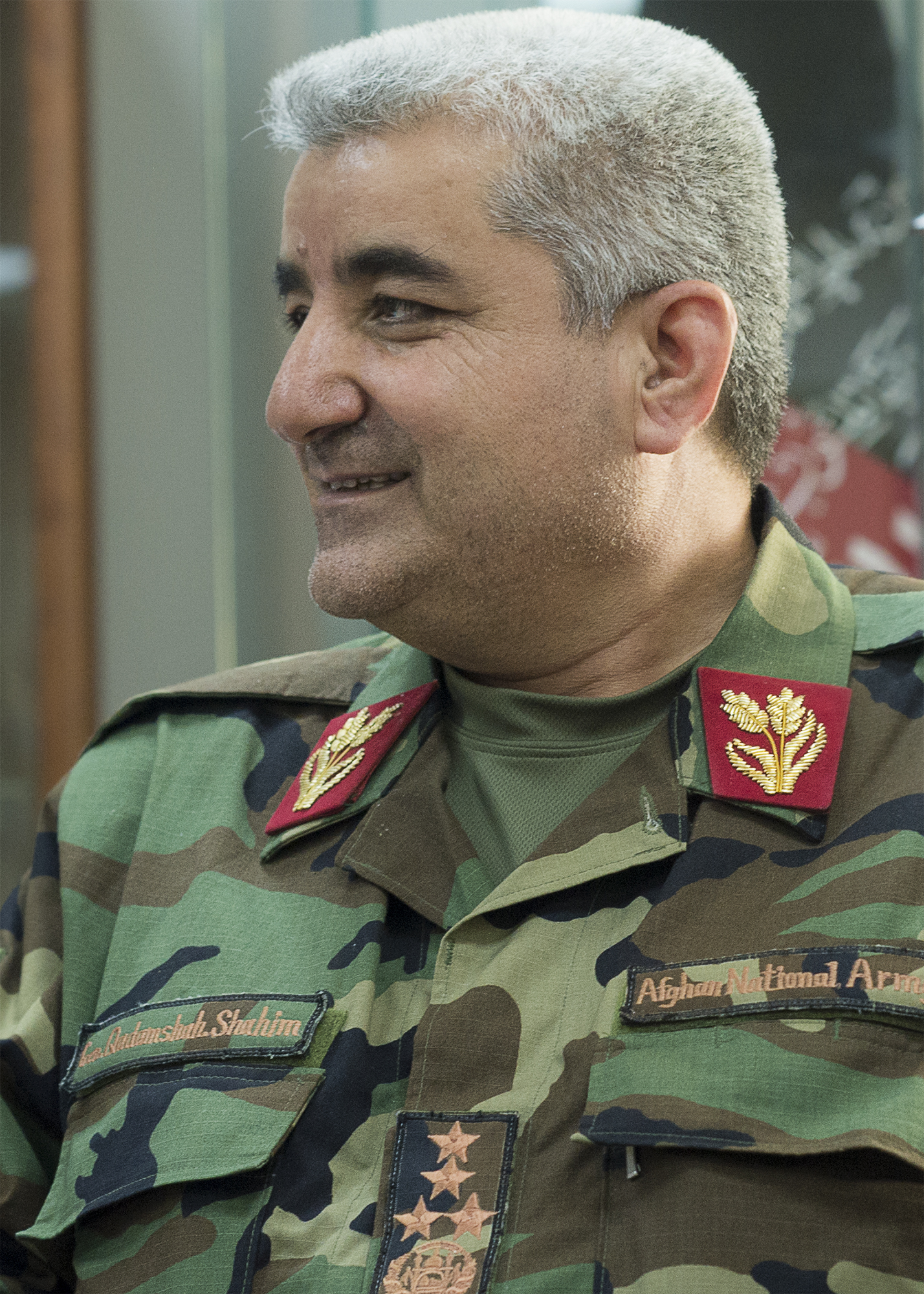
- Shahim in 2016

Chief of Staff of the National Resistance Front of Afghanistan
- Incumbent
- Assumed office 17 May 2025
- President: Ahmad Massoud

Afghan Ambassador to Oman
- In office 11 December 2018 – 15 August 2021
- President: Ashraf Ghani

Afghan Ambassador to Kazakhstan
- In office 27 April 2017 – 2018
- President: Ashraf Ghani
- Preceded by: Mohammad Farooq Baraki
- Succeeded by: Mohammad Farhad Azimi

Chief of Staff of the Afghan National Army
- In office 22 May 2015 – 24 April 2017
- President: Ashraf Ghani
- Preceded by: Sher Mohammad Karimi
- Succeeded by: Mohammad Sharif Yaftali

Personal details
- Born: 1962 (age 63–64) Tashkan, Badakhshan, Afghanistan

Military service
- Allegiance: Afghanistan; Jamiat-e Islami
- Branch/service: Afghan National Army
- Rank: General
- Unit: 111th Capital Division
- Battles/wars: Soviet–Afghan War; Afghan Civil War; War in Afghanistan

Qadam Shah Shahim (Dari: قدم‌شاه شهیم; born 1962) is an Afghan diplomat and former army officer. He served as the Chief of Staff of the Afghan National Army from May 2015 to April 2017 before resigning amid political fallout over the 2017 Camp Shaheen attack. Since then, he has served as the chief of staff of the National Resistance Front of Afghanistan's military wing.

== Early life and education ==
Shahim, an ethnic Tajik, was born in the Tashkan district of Badakhshan, in 1962 and attended Keshm High School, graduating in 1982.

== Career ==
From the early 1980's, Shahim fought with Jamiat-e Islami against the Soviets. He later fought against other mujahedin factions during the civil war, and then against the Taliban. In 1994, he was appointed as commander of 82 Regiment in Qargha, and in 1997 was made a Brigadier. In 2001, Shahim was commander of the 37th Brigade of Commandos and dealt often with foreign fighters.

=== Afghan National Army ===
In 2007, he commanded the 1st Brigade of the 111th Capital Division, based in Kabul. In 2011, he was appointed as commander of the 111th Capital Division, which is half the size of a normal division.

In July 2014, Shahim was wounded in the attack on Kabul Airport and hospitalised in Sardar Mohammad Daoud Khan hospital for further treatment.

In May 2015, he was appointed as Chief of the General Staff of the Afghan National Army.

In August and September 2016, Shahim visited India in order to enhance ties with the Indian army and to seek new avenues for acquiring military equipment.

As of 2025, he is the chief of staff of the military wing of the National Resistance Front of Afghanistan.
