= Tashkan =

Tashkan may refer to:

- Tashkan, Afghanistan
- Tashkan-e Sadat, Iran
- Teshkan Rural District, in Iran
