= Fazel Ahmed Manawi =

Afghan judge and politician

- فضل أحمد معنوي

Military service
- Allegiance: National Resistance Front

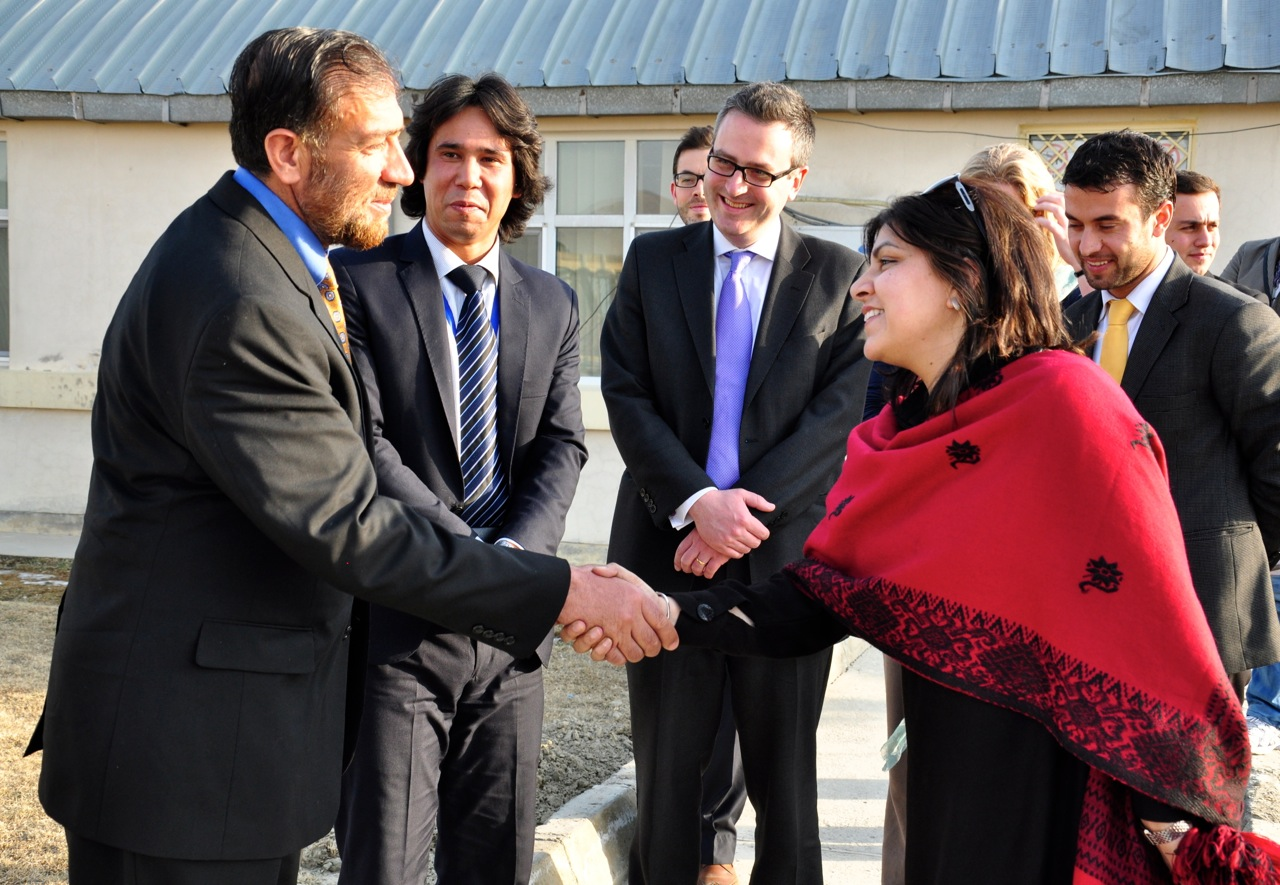
UK Foreign Office Senior Minister of State Baroness Warsi meeting Fazal Ahmad Manawi, Head of Independent Electoral Commission of Afghanistan, March 2013

Fazal Ahmad Manawi (Pashto: فضل أحمد معنوي) is an Afghan politician, electoral expert, and Islamic scholar. A judge by profession, Manawi has served as a member and later as chairperson of the Independent Election Commission (2009-2013). In post-2001 administrations, he had held some senior government positions, including deputy chief justice. During his tenure as chairperson of the election commission, Manawi successfully managed the post-election crises. He also formerly served as the Minister of Justice in the republican government. He is reportedly a senior leader in the National Resistance Front (NRF).

For his leadership, his national and international colleagues have admired him. In 2014, as Senior Electoral Advisor to then candidate Dr. Abdullah Abdullah, played an instrumental role in shaping the parameters of June 2014 runoff's recount and audit.

A master of Islamic Law, Manawi has also served as instructor and guest lecturer at various national universities, including Kabul University. Fluent in Arabic and Persian, Manawi has written many academic articles and participated in international panels on Sharia, moderation, democracy, and election. A former deputy for the Ulema Council of Afghanistan, Manawi remains an authority among moderate Islamic scholars in the country.

== See also ==
- Hasib Markaz
