= Mohammad Fahim Dashty =

Afghan politician and former Panjshir resistance leader (c.1973–2021)

- محمد فهیم دشتی
- Born: c. 1973; Kingdom of Afghanistan
- Died: 4 or 5 September 2021 (aged 47–48); Dashtak, Anaba District, Panjshir Province, Afghanistan
- Known for: Spokesman of the NRF (National Resistance Front of Afghanistan)
- Relatives: Abdullah Abdullah

Mohammad Fahim Dashty (c. 1973 – 4 or 5 September 2021; Persian: محمد فهیم دشتی) was an Afghan journalist, politician and military official. In 2021, he served as spokesman of the National Resistance Front of Afghanistan during the Republican insurgency in Afghanistan.

== Biography ==
Born around 1973, Dashty was the nephew of Afghan politician, Abdullah Abdullah, and a close associate of the family of the Northern Alliance leader, Ahmad Shah Massoud. He was with Massoud when the latter was killed by a suicide bombing on 9 September 2001. Dashty was badly wounded in the bombing.

After the United States invasion of Afghanistan, Dashty founded a newspaper based at Kabul and became known for supporting journalists and advocating freedom of speech in Afghanistan. He was a leader of the Afghanistan National Journalist Union (ANJU) as well as a key figure in the Federation for "Afghan Journalists and Media Entities", founded in 2012. In addition, he contributed to the South Asia Press Freedom Report.

In 2021, following the takeover of Afghanistan by Taliban, Dashty joined the National Resistance Front of Afghanistan as a spokesman. Beforehand, he had reportedly refused offers of a government post by the Taliban. Dashty was one of the main sources of information in the Panjshir Valley as the Taliban pressed in, issuing statements on Twitter. Shortly before his death, he stated "If we die, history will write about us, as people who stood for their country till the end of the line". On 4 or 5 September 2021, Dashty was killed in combat during the Taliban offensive into Panjshir. His death was confirmed by his friend Noor Rahman Akhlaqi on Facebook as well as other sources. The Taliban claimed that he had died as they had advanced into Bazarak, capital of the Panjshir Province. In contrast, the International Federation of Journalists stated that he had died alongside General Abdul Wodo Zara at Dashtak, Anaba District. According to unspecified sources and defense analyst Babak Taghvaee, Dashty was killed by a Pakistani drone strike during the fighting. NRF officials seconded these claims, specifying that Dashty had been killed by a Pakistani drone strike at Anaba. Pakistan and the Taliban denied this, with the latter eventually claiming that Dashy had been shot during a clash between NRF commanders. Reportedly BBC Persian, in an interview with Dashty, leaked a number leading to his location.

After his death, former colleagues, associates, and organizations like the ANJU, Afghanistan Independent Journalists' Association (AIJA), and the International Federation of Journalists released eulogies in his honor.
