= Anaba District =

Anaba انابه Anabah
- District
- Location within Afghanistan
- Coordinates: 35.2239°N 69.4053°E
- Country: Afghanistan
- Province: Panjshir
- Time zone: UTC+04:30 (AST)

Anaba or Anabah District (Dari: ولسوالی انابه) is a district of Panjshir Province, Afghanistan. The estimated population in 2019 was 19,978.

On 5 September 2021, Taliban spokesperson Bilal Karimi said that the four districts of Panjshir Province had been captured, including Anabah District.

However, Panjshir Resistance spokesman Ali Maisam Nazary later made unverified claims that 60% of the entire province was still under National Resistance Front control.

On 6 October 2021, the NRF claimed it had stormed the district and liberated it. It claimed to have killed over 50 Taliban and wounded over 20 Taliban fighters.

== Facilities ==
=== Medical ===
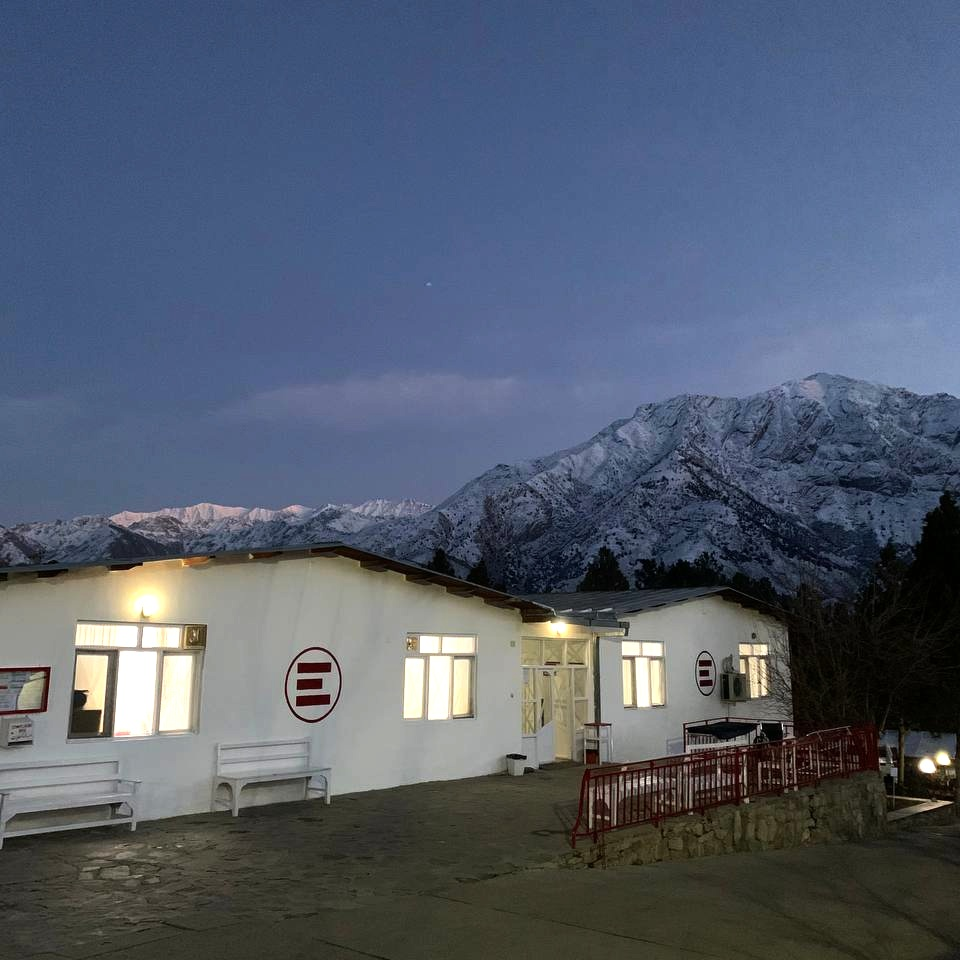
Medical facility of the NGO Emergency, in Anabah, Afghanistan, with Hindu Kush mountains in the background.

A Surgical and Paediatric Centre and a Maternity Centre are run by the Italian non-governmental organisation Emergency in Anaba since 1999. This was the first intervention by Emergency in Afghanistan, and also serves as a centre of operations for smaller posts across the valley and neighbouring provinces.

== See also ==
- Districts of Afghanistan
