= Abdullah Khenjani =

Afghan politician (born 1988)

- عبدالله آزاده خنجانی

Spokesperson and Head of the Political Bureau of the National Resistance Front of Afghanistan (NRF)
- Incumbent
- Assumed office 2024
- President: Ahmad Massoud

Deputy Minister at the State Ministry for Peace
- In office 2020–2021

Program Director, Director of News and Current Affairs at 1tv
- In office 2010–2019

Personal details
- Born: 1988 (age 37–38) Baghlan, Afghanistan
- Party: Independent
- Education: King's College London
- Occupation: Politician
- Ethnicity: Tajik
- Website: Nrf-afghanistan.com

Abdullah Khenjani (Note: Dari: عبدالله آزاده خنجانی) (born 1988) is an Afghan politician, media executive and former journalist who is serving as the head of the political bureau of the National Resistance Front (NRF), an opposition movement against Taliban rule, since 2023. He previously served as deputy minister at the State Ministry for Peace of Afghanistan, where he played a key role in coordinating and supporting peace negotiations with the Taliban, including the Doha peace process.

Khenjani is also known for his career in journalism, particularly his leadership roles at 1TV Afghanistan, one of the country's prominent independent news networks.

== Early life and education ==
Abdullah Khenjani was born in 1988 in Afghanistan and is of Tajik ethnic background. He pursued higher education abroad after being awarded the Alexandros Petersen Scholarship at King's College London, a competitive scholarship designed to support outstanding students from Afghanistan, Central Asia, and the South Caucasus.

He earned a master's degree in war studies from the Department of War Studies at King's College London, where his academic focus included conflict, peacebuilding, and international security. Khenjani is also an alumnus of King's College London and later became the founder of the Democratic Society in Kabul, a civic initiative aimed at promoting political dialogue and democratic values.

== Political activities ==
Khenjani began his public career as a journalist and media executive. He held several senior positions at 1TV Afghanistan, including program director, director of news and current affairs, and later editor-in-chief. During his tenure, 1TV played a significant role in shaping public debate on political and social issues in Afghanistan.

In 2020, Khenjani was appointed deputy minister at the State Ministry for Peace, where he was responsible for coordination, strategy, and policy related to peace efforts. He remained in this position until the fall of Kabul in August 2021 and was involved in supporting the Afghan government's engagement in peace talks with the Taliban.

After the Taliban takeover, Khenjani emerged as a prominent political voice in exile and later inside opposition circles. He was appointed Head of the Political Bureau of the National Resistance Front of Afghanistan (NRF), led by Ahmad Massoud. In this role, he has participated in international conferences and political forums, including events linked to the Vienna Process, advocating for a democratic alternative to Taliban rule and highlighting human rights violations, particularly against women and girls.

Khenjani is a frequent commentator on Afghan political affairs and has appeared in regional and international media discussing peace, resistance, and the future of governance in Afghanistan.
