= Nazar Mohammad Mutmaeen =

Afghan writer and journalist (born 1973)

Engr Nazar Mohammad Mutmaeen
- نظرمحمد مطمین

Acting Head of the National Olympic Committee of the Islamic Emirate of Afghanistan (unrecognized)
- In office 21 September 2021 – 2023
- Preceded by: Hafizullah Wali Rahimi
- Succeeded by: Ahmadullah Wasiq
- Writing career
- Born: 1971 (age 54–55); Nad Ali District, Helmand province, Afghanistan
- Education: Nangarhar University; Kabul University
- Occupations: writer, journalist, political analyst

Nazar Mohammad Mutmaeen (Pashto: نظرمحمد مطمین) (born 1973) is an Afghan writer, journalist and political analyst. He previously served as acting head of the National Olympic Committee of the Islamic Emirate of Afghanistan under the Taliban government. The International Olympic Committee has not recognized Muatmeen and considers his predecessor Hafizullah Wali Rahimi to be the legitimate president in exile of the Afghan Olympic Committee.

Mutmaeen was born in 1973 in Nad Ali District of Helmand province, Afghanistan. He studied at Nangarhar University and graduated with a degree in civil engineering from Kabul University.
