= National Movement of Afghanistan =

The National Movement of Afghanistan (Hezb-e-Nuhzhat-e-Mili Afghanistan) is a political party stated in 2003 by Ahmad Wali Massoud.
