= Fahim Hashimi =

Afghan politician

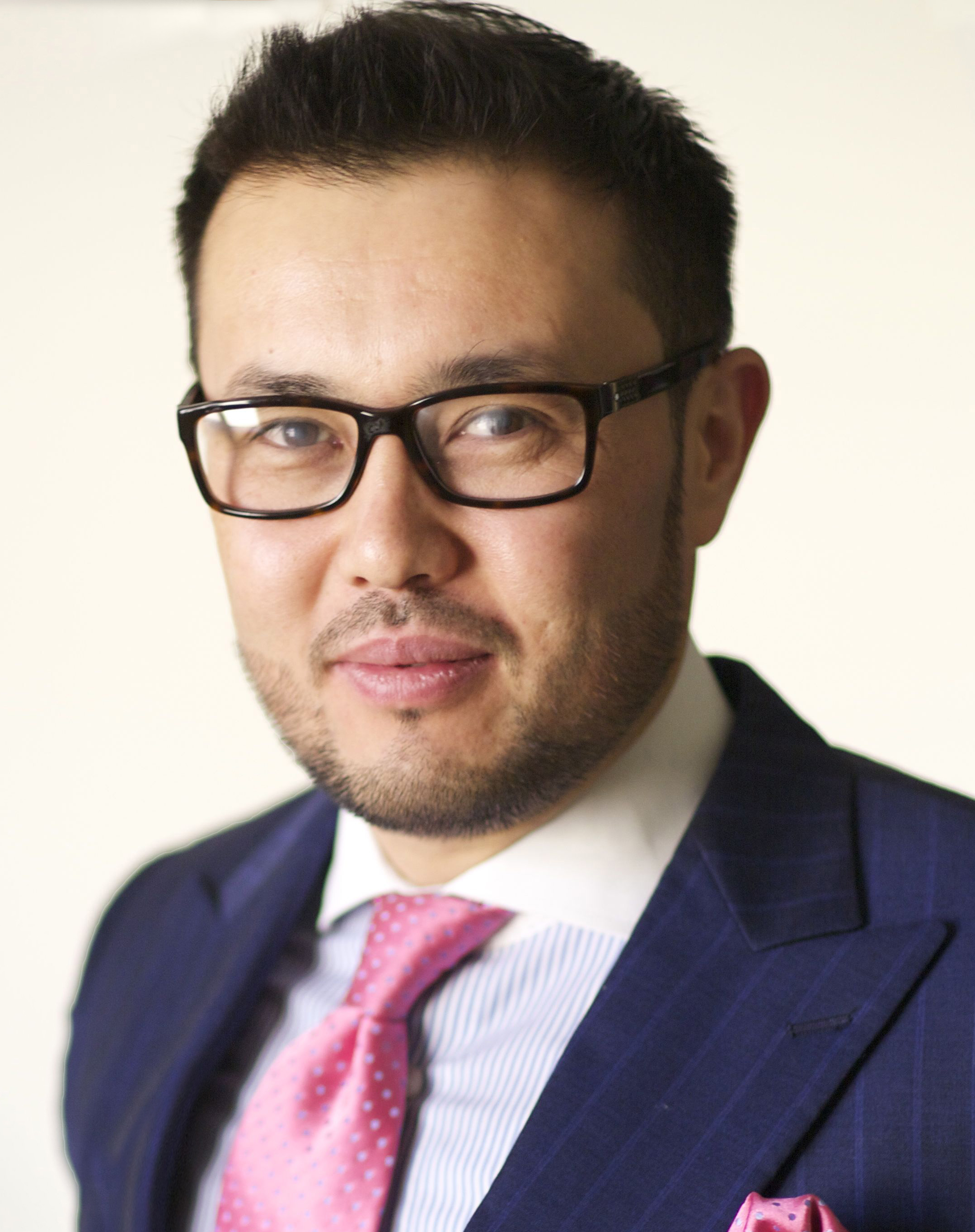

5th Minister of Telecommunication and Information Technology
- In office May 27, 2019 – August 21, 2020
- President: Ashraf Ghani
- Deputy: Hadi Hedayati
- Preceded by: Shahzad Gul Aryobee
- Succeeded by: Masoumeh Khavari

2nd President of the Afghanistan Olympic Committee
- In office April 30, 2014 – September 14, 2015
- President: Ashraf Ghani
- Preceded by: Mohammad Zahir Aghbar
- Succeeded by: Mohammad Zahir Aghbar

Personal details
- Born: Muhammad Fahim Hashimi; September 27, 1980 (age 45) Kabul, Democratic Republic of Afghanistan

Fahim Hashimi (Dari: فهیم هاشمی; born September 27, 1980) is an Afghan politician who was the Minister for Telecommunication and Information Technology from 2019 to 2020. He was the second elected President of the Afghanistan Olympic Committee from 2014–2015. He had served as the acting vice-president before taking over from Mohammad Zahir Aghbar.

== Early life ==
Hashimi was born on September 27, 1980 in Kabul, Afghanistan. He belongs to the Hazara ethnic group.

== Businesses ==
Fahim Hashimi is one of Afghanistan's leading entrepreneurs. In 2005 he began building one of the largest logistics companies in Afghanistan, focusing on providing critical services and material resources to the Afghan government and international forces. In 2010, Hashimi launched 1TV, Afghanistan's second largest TV network, the centerpiece of GroupOne, a media production and the strategic communications group MCXI. This venture is part of the Hashimi Group, an Afghan conglomerate with interests in fuel logistics, manufacturing, airlines, trading, and construction.

== ANOC presidency ==
Hashimi was elected to a four-year term as NOC President at the ANOC General Assembly in Kabul on April 30, 2014. He secured 27 votes in the first round of voting, giving him the majority needed to be elected. He succeeded Mohammad Zahir Aghbar who served as ANOC President from 2009 to 2014.

Following his election as NOC President, Hashimi stated that he wanted "to create a world class NOC and that he also want to increase the participation of women in sports and show that culturally you can be a good Muslim woman but also a good athlete." Further he mentioned that the election was a historic day and that he now wants to take the NOC to the next level.

Preceded by Mohammad Zahir Aghbar	President of the Afghanistan National Olympic Committee; 2014—2015	Succeeded by Mohammad Zahir Aghbar
