= Hasib Quwayi Markaz =

Afghan military commander (1992–2026)

Hasib Quwayi Markaz حسیب قوای مرکز
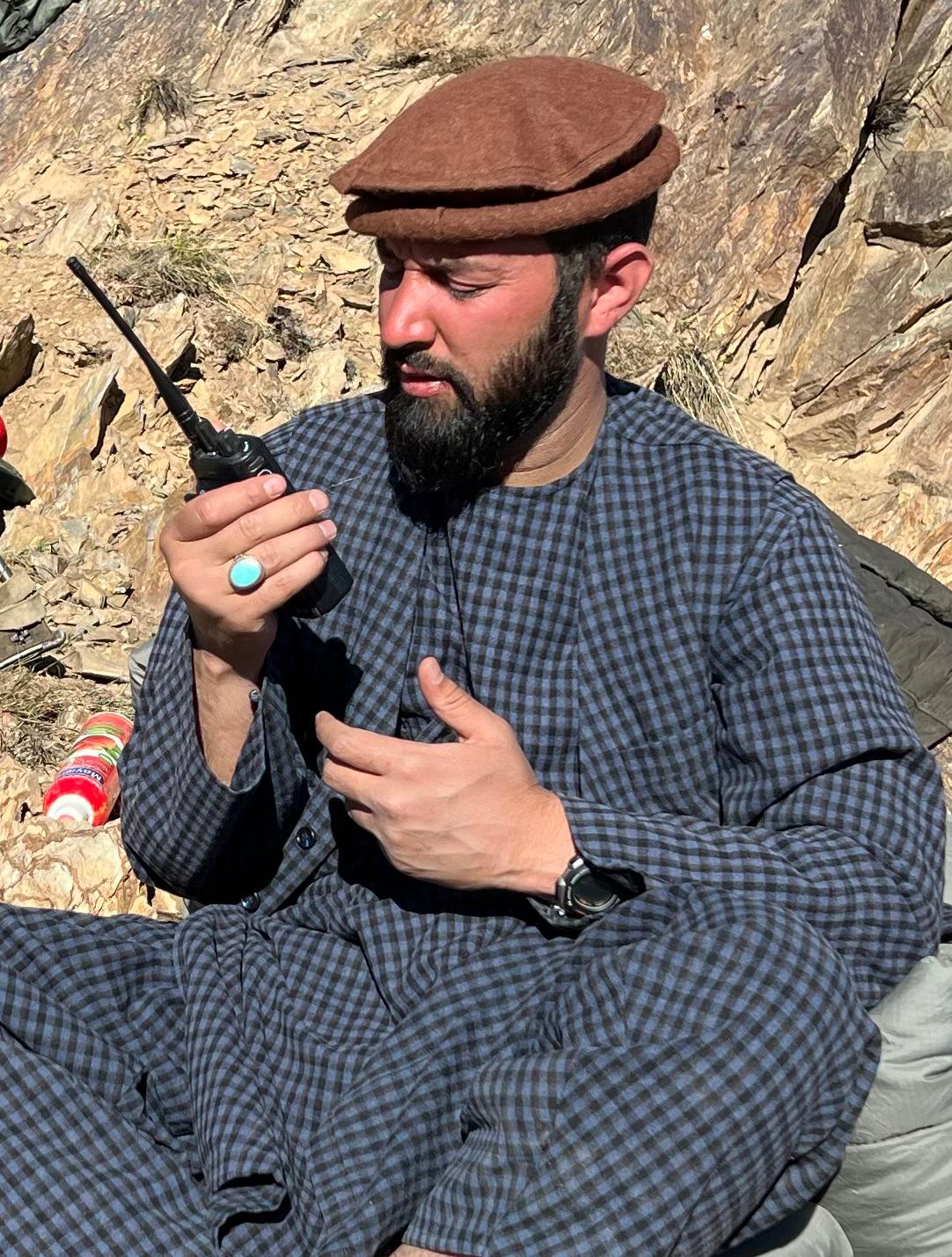
- Born: 28 January 1992; Abdara, Afghanistan
- Died: 19 August 2026 (aged 34); Salang, Afghanistan
- Cause of death: Gunshot wounds
- Military career
- Allegiance: National Resistance Front
- Service years: 2021–2026
- Conflicts: Republican insurgency in Afghanistan

Hasib Quwayi Markaz (Note: Dari: حسیب قوای مرکز) (28 January 1992 – 19 August 2026), also known as Hasib Quwayi Markaz, (Note: Dari: حسیب پنجشيری) was an Afghan Tajik military commander who served as a prominent field commander of the National Resistance Front (NRF) in northern Afghanistan.

Hasib Panjshiri, Afghan resistance commander

Hasib Quwayi Markaz was killed by the Afghan Taliban on 19 August 2026 in the Salang district of Parwan province, after being ambushed due to an intelligence tip-off, from one of his own companions. Hasib's body was mutilated by Taliban soldiers and displayed in the province, which drew criticism.

== Early life and background ==
Hasib Quwayi Markaz was born on 28 January 1992 in Abdara, Panjshir province, to an ethnic Tajik family.

In 2014, after completing higher military education, he entered the special units of the National Directorate of Security (NDS). Markaz left the NDS in 2018. Later in 2019, he claimed that the NDS asked him to assassinate six of the country's elites, but he refused. After these statements, the National Security Directorate of Afghanistan issued a warrant for his arrest. In a statement, the Ministry of Interior accused Markaz of three murders. Markaz denied these accusations, claiming that the government had fabricated cases against him.

On 24 March 2019, special forces of the NDS and the Ministry of Interior went to Panjshir province to arrest him. After several hours of fighting, the Afghan Ministry of Interior announced that the operation to capture Markaz by the central forces had failed.

== Military career for the NRF ==
After the fall of Kabul on 15 August 2021, Markaz with the forces under his command, led by Ahmad Massoud, prepared for armed defense against the Taliban. He became one of the founding members of the National Resistance Front (NRF). With frequent Taliban attacks on Panjshir Valley and bloody conflicts in this province, he was able to inflict heavy casualties on the Taliban, but due to the lack of ammunition, lack of sufficient forces and the breaking of the battle lines by Taliban infiltrators, Markaz with the forces under his command had to retreat.

In 2022, during the chain of conflicts and intense attacks by the Taliban in the Panjshir Valley, Markaz managed to shoot down a fleet of Russian Mi-17 helicopters belonging to Taliban forces. He captured two Taliban pilots and one senior commander who were onboard the chopper.

In 2025, Markaz and another NRF commander Khalid Amiri, appeared in photos, claiming presence in mountains of Afghanistan. Later on, NRF military leader Qadam Shah Shahim confirmed NRF presence in Afghanistan.

== Death ==
On 19 August 2026, Markaz was killed by the Taliban in Parwan province. He was travelling with at least seven other NRF members in two Toyota Hilux vehicles from Panjshir to Andarab District in Baghlan province. Taliban intelligence, however, learned of his movements and ambushed them en route in the Salang District of Parwan province. Markaz was killed at the scene of the ambush, along with at least four other members of the NRF. Markaz's dead body was subsequently mocked by Taliban soldiers, which drew criticism from Afghan figures.

=== Reactions ===
NRF leader Ahmad Massoud congratulated the people of Afghanistan on Markaz's "heroic martyrdom", calling upon people not to fall into despair and asserted that Afghanistan will soon "witness developments". Jamiat-e-Islami leader Salahuddin Rabbani, Abdul Rashid Dostum, Haji Muhammad Muhaqiq and several others expressed condolences upon the demise of Markaz.
