= Ali Nazary =

Afghan American politician and diplomat (born 1990)

- علی‌ نظری
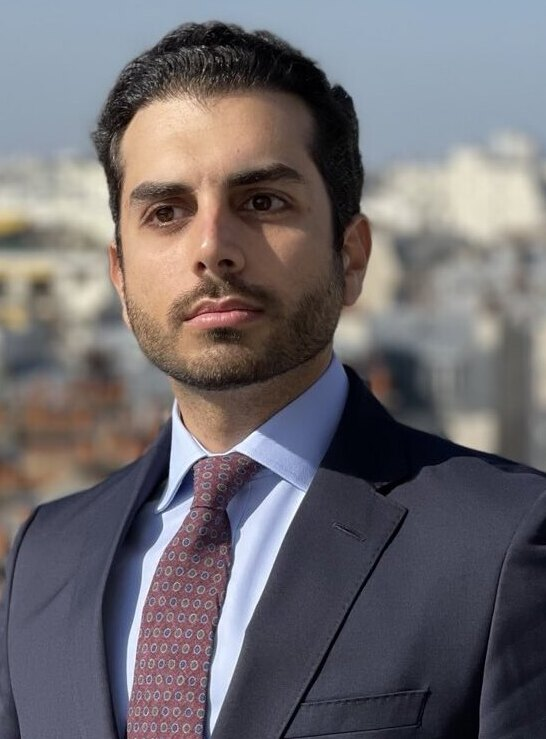

Head of Foreign Relations of the National Resistance Front
- Incumbent
- Assumed office August 2021
- Leader: Ahmad Massoud
- Preceded by: Office established

Personal details
- Born: 1990 (age 35–36) Afghanistan
- Education: University of California, Los Angeles; London School of Economics

Ali Maisam Nazary (Note: Dari: علی‌میثم نظری) (born 1990) is an Afghan politician and diplomat who has served since 2021 as the head of foreign relations of the National Resistance Front (NRF), of which he is a founding member.

== Education ==
Ali Maisam Nazary was born to a Qiziblash family. He is an alumnus of the University of California, Los Angeles and the London School of Economics. He graduated from UCLA in 2012, with a degree in political science and Middle Eastern studies, and from LSE in 2013 with a master's in international relations.

== Career ==
Nazary began his career in communications at Khorasan TV, hosting a weekly show on politics and current affairs in Afghanistan. He then was Director of Media Affairs for Abdullah Abdullah's 2014 presidential campaign, and following the election, Nazary took a hiatus from politics to work as an Afghan and Central Asian government relations specialist at Bellwether Partners, overseeing international relations consulting and management projects.

In 2016, he also became president of the Massoud Foundation USA, the U.S. branch of the Massoud family's Afghanistan based relief organization, a position he continues to hold, being entrusted to perform duties such as transcribing and translating portions of Ahmad Shah Massoud's diary for usage in publication.

In the summer of 2018, Nazary received confidential information that the American government was seeking to enter into direct negotiations with the Taliban and from that point onwards he became a staunch critic of the resulting Doha Agreement.

In September 2019, he attended a large rally of over 30,000 people in Panjshir that led to the launch of Ahmad Massoud's political movement, of which Nazary became a founding member.

=== National Resistance Front ===
As tensions between the government and the Taliban grew amidst the drawdown of NATO forces from Afghanistan, Nazary served as a chief foreign policy advisor and a liaison between Ahmad Massoud and foreign diplomats up until his departure from Kabul a few days after 15 August 2021. With the fall of Kabul and Ashraf Ghani's flight from the country, Massoud formed the National Resistance Front (NRF), based in Panjshir. Subsequently, Nazary was appointed head of foreign relations for the NRF. His tenure has been characterised by legislative advocacy for international recognition of the NRF and a push for a democratic and decentralized form of governance in Afghanistan that would guarantee equal rights for all citizens regardless of race, religion, or gender. He has been described as Massoud's "point man".

== Publications ==
=== Articles ===
- Nazary, Ali Maisam (12 February 2017). "نظام پارلمانی، تضمینی برای حکمرانی خوب در افغانستان". BBC Persian (in Persian).
- Nazary, Ali Maisam; Nishat, Zalmai (12 September 2020). "Peace in Afghanistan is impossible without an inclusive approach". TRT World.
- Nazary, Ali Maisam (19 August 2022). "What the Taliban Really Fear". Foreign Affairs.
- Cook, David; Nazary, Ali Maisam (23 May 2023). "Terrorist cells proliferate in Afghanistan". The Washington Times.

=== Scholarly chapters ===
- Nazary, Ali Maisam. "Cultural, Religious and Economic Integration: Future of Afghanistan-Pakistan Relations", in (eds.) Huma Baqai, Nausheen Wasi, Pakistan-Afghanistan Relations: Pitfalls and the Way Forward, Friedrich Ebert Foundation, 2021. pp. 75–88.
