= Mohammad Zahir Aghbar =

Afghan diplomat and law enforcement official (born 1964)

- محمد ظاهر اغبر
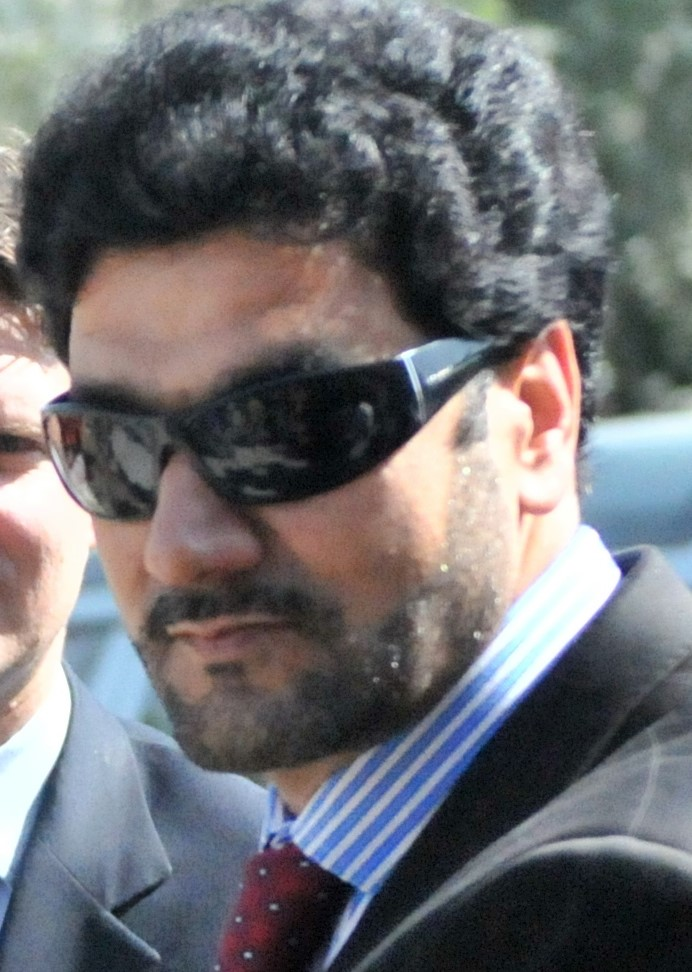
- Aghbar in 2011

Ambassador of Afghanistan to Tajikistan
- Incumbent
- Assumed office 20 February 2020
- President: Ashraf Ghani
- Preceded by: Zalmai Younusi

1st and 3rd President of the Afghanistan National Olympic Committee
- In office 14 September 2015 – 5 April 2018
- Preceded by: Fahim Hashimy
- Succeeded by: Hafizullah Wali Rahimi
- In office 28 September 2009 – 30 April 2014
- Preceded by: Office established
- Succeeded by: Fahim Hashimy

Personal details
- Born: 1964 (age 61–62) Nangarhar Province, Kingdom of Afghanistan
- Police career
- Allegiance: Afghanistan
- Department: Afghan National Police
- Rank: Lieutenant general

Mohammad Zahir Aghbar (Pashto/Dari: محمد ظاهر اغبر; also spelled Akhbar) (born 1964) is an Afghan diplomat and former law enforcement official. He currently serves as Afghanistan's ambassador to Tajikistan and has also claimed the title of acting First Vice President of Afghanistan.

== Early life ==
Zahir Aghbar was born in 1964 in Nangarhar Province.

== Law enforcement career ==
As the chief of the Afghan National Police, Aghbar held the rank of lieutenant general.

== Afghanistan National Olympic Committee ==
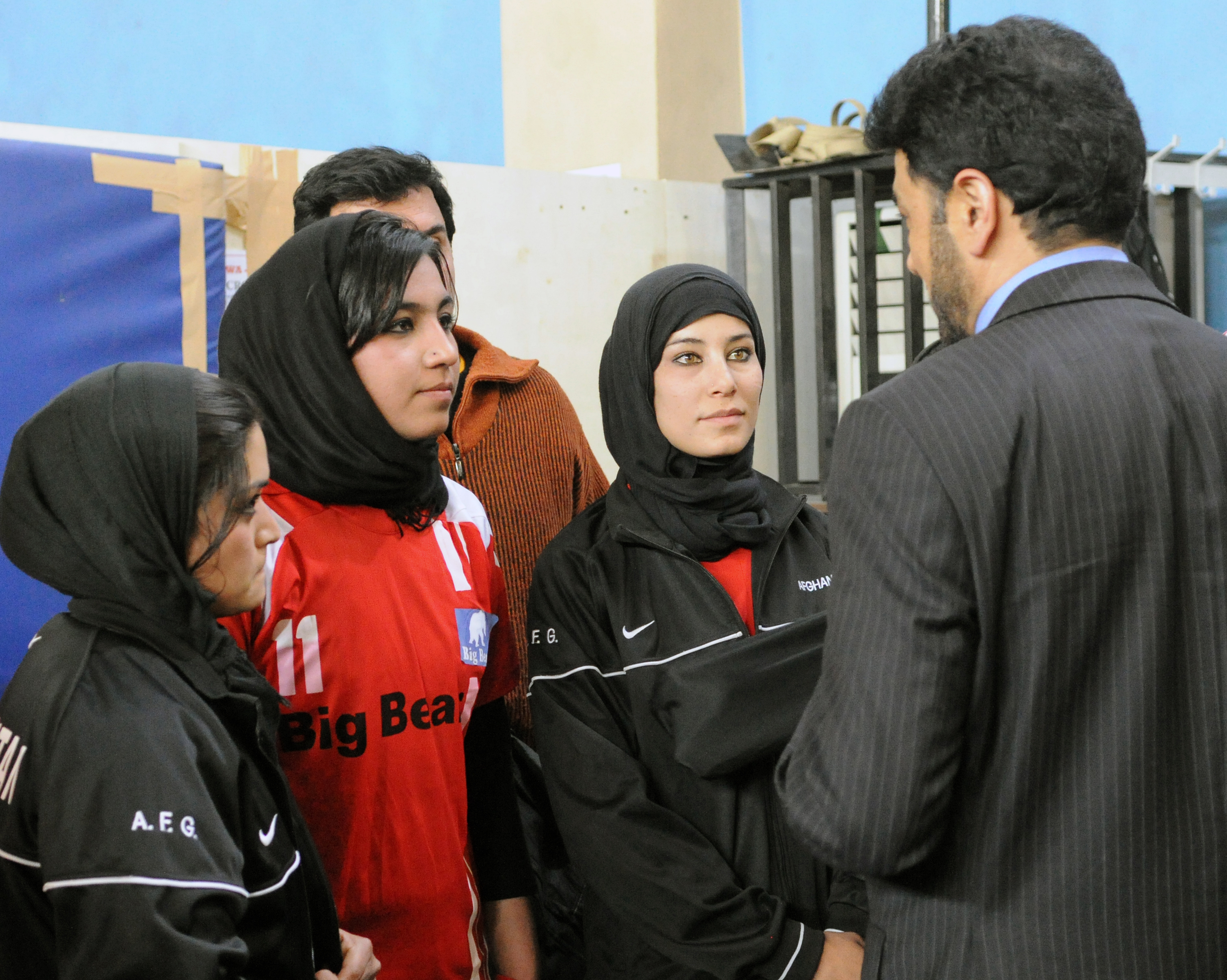
Aghbar congratulating the Afghan Women’s Olympic Basketball Team in 2012

Aghbar served as the head of the Afghanistan National Olympic Committee from 2009 until the election of Fahim Hashimy in 2014. During this time, he supported Abdullah Abdullah's 2014 presidential campaign, including protests against the result, and later served as his security advisor.

After Hashimy's resignation as committee head the next year, Aghbar was again elected head of the committee, to the displeasure of Hashimy, who declared the results null and void. After a government inquiry agreed with his rival, Aghbar then led a march on Kabul.

After the march, he withdrew from consideration as president in 2017, paving the way for Hafizullah Wali Rahimi to be elected in 2018.

== Diplomatic career ==
Aghbar's diplomatic career began in 2018, when he was appointed consul-general in Germany. He later became the Afghan ambassador to Tajikistan, presenting his diplomatic credentials on February 20, 2020.

=== Taliban offensive ===
After the fall of Kabul to the Taliban in August 2021, Aghbar joined the Panjshir resistance. He also decried the flight of Ashraf Ghani, called for his arrest for allegedly absconding with some $169 million US dollars, and stated that "Panjshir stands strong against anyone who wants to enslave people." Aghbar claimed Ghani “stole $169m from the state coffers” and called for Interpol to arrest not only Ghani, but also Ghani's two aides Hamdallah Moheb and Fazl Mahmoud Fazli for stealing public funds.

In an interview with Eurasianet, Aghbar stated his resolve to keep working, even for no pay, and further claimed that Ghani "had a prior agreement with the Taliban".

He was also given the title of Deputy President to acting Afghanistan President Amrullah Saleh.
