= National Olympic Committee of the Islamic Republic of Afghanistan =

National Olympic Committee of Afghanistan

- Country: Islamic Republic of Afghanistan
- Code: AFG
- Created: 1920
- Recognized: 1936
- Continental Association: OCA
- Headquarters: Kabul, Afghanistan
- President: Hafizullah Wali Rahimi (president, recognized by IOC); Ahmadullah Wasiq (rival acting president, unrecognized by IOC)
- Secretary General: Younas Popalzai
- CEO: Dad Mohammad Paida Akhtari
- Website: www.olympic.af

The National Olympic Committee of the Islamic Republic of Afghanistan (Pashto: د افغانستان د اسلامي جمهوریت د المپیک ملي کمیټه, Dari: کمیته ملی المپیک جمهوری اسلامی افغانستان, IOC code: AFG), formerly known as Afghanistan National Olympic Committee (Pashto: کمیته ملی المپیک افغانستان, Dari: کمیته ملی المپیک افغانستان), is the National Olympic Committee representing Afghanistan. The committee is currently in exile and presided by Hafizullah Wali Rahimi. The Taliban regime established a rival committee, known as General Directorate of Olympics, Physical Education and Sports (Pashto: د المپیک، فزیکي زده کړو او سپورت عمومي ریاست, Dari: ریاست عمومی المپیک، تربیت بدنی و ورزش), following their takeover of the country in 2021, which has not been recognised by the International Olympic Committee (IOC).

== History ==
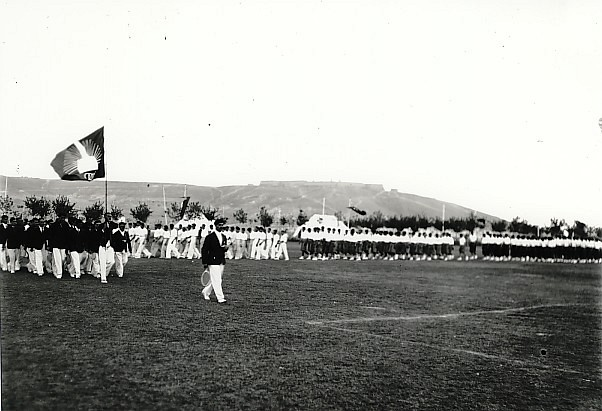
Parade of athletes in Chaman-e-Hozori, following the flag of the Afghanistan National Olympic Committee in the 1930s

Flag of the Olympic Committee used in the 30s

Logo of the Olympic Committee from the period of the first Republic (1974–1978)

The Olympic committee was created in 1920, but was recognized in 1936, in time for Afghanistan's Olympic debut at the 1936 Summer Olympics in Berlin, Germany.

The committee counsels Afghanistan's Olympic movement and organises the participation of athletes in Olympic sports to represent Afghanistan at the Summer Olympics and Summer Youth Olympic, and also the Asian Games. Committee presidents are elected at Extraordinary General Assemblies (EGAs).

Hafizullah Wali Rahimi was elected as president of the committee in 2018. Following the 2021 Taliban takeover, Nazar Mohammad Mutmaeen was appointed in his place. However, as of the 2022 Asian Games (held in 2023) and the 2024 Summer Olympics, the Olympic Council of Asia and International Olympic Committee continue to recognize Rahimi as president. Rahimi has been described by the IOC as a president in exile.

In May 2024, the Taliban government, in violation of the Olympic Charter, merging the National Olympic Committee with the General Directorate of Physical Education and Sport to form the General Directorate of Olympics, Physical Education and Sports, currently headed by Ahmadullah Wasiq.

== List of presidents ==
President	Term
Mohammad Anwar Jekdalek	2005—2009
Mohammad Zahir Aghbar	2009—2014
Fahim Hashimy	2014—2015
Mahmood Hanif (acting)	2015—2017
Mohammad Zahir Aghbar	2017—2018
Hafizullah Wali Rahimi	2018—present (de jure)
Nazar Mohammad Mutmaeen (acting, unrecognized)	2021–2023
Ahmadullah Wasiq (acting, unrecognized)	2023–present

== See also ==
- Afghanistan at the Olympics
- Afghanistan at the Paralympics
- Afghanistan at the Asian Games
- Sport in Afghanistan
