= Hafizullah Wali Rahimi =

President of the National Olympic Committee of the Islamic Republic of Afghanistan

4th President of the National Olympic Committee of the Islamic Republic of Afghanistan
- Incumbent
- Assumed office 5 April 2018 (in exile as of September 2021)
- Preceded by: Mohammad Zahir Aghbar
- Succeeded by: Nazar Mohammad Mutmaeen (appointed in 2021 by the Taliban regime, unrecognized)

Personal details
- Known for: President of the National Olympic Committee of the Islamic Republic of Afghanistan

Hafizullah Wali Rahimi has been serving as president of the National Olympic Committee of the Islamic Republic of Afghanistan (formerly Afghanistan National Olympic Committee) since April 2018. In September 2021, Rahimi left Afghanistan after the Taliban's return to power. He is still recognized as the Committee's president in exile. He is of Tajik ethnicity. Rahimi is also a member of the Peace Through Sport Committee.

== Career ==
On 5 April 2018, at the NOC's third Extraordinary General Assembly (EGA) in Kabul, Rahimi was elected to the committee's president. The elections were supervised by IOC representatives from the Olympic Council of Asia (OCA), including the continental body's Asian Games Head of Department, Haider Farman. Rahimi succeeded Mohammad Zahir Aghbar as President of the committee.

The President is accompanied by CEO Dad Mohammad Paida Akhtari, secretary general Mohammad Yonus Popalzay, Vice Presidents Bawar Hotak and Mohammad Hashim Karimi, and Vice President for the women's division, Robina Jalali.

In 2020, Rahimi signed an agreement with four national sports federations to secure Olympic Solidarity funding for the 2020 Summer Olympics.

== See also ==
- Afghanistan National Olympic Committee
- Afghanistan at the Olympics
- Afghanistan at the Paralympics
- Afghanistan at the Asian Games
- Sports in Afghanistan
