= Ahmad Wali Massoud =

Afghan politician and diplomat

Ahmad Wali Massoud احمد ولی مسعود
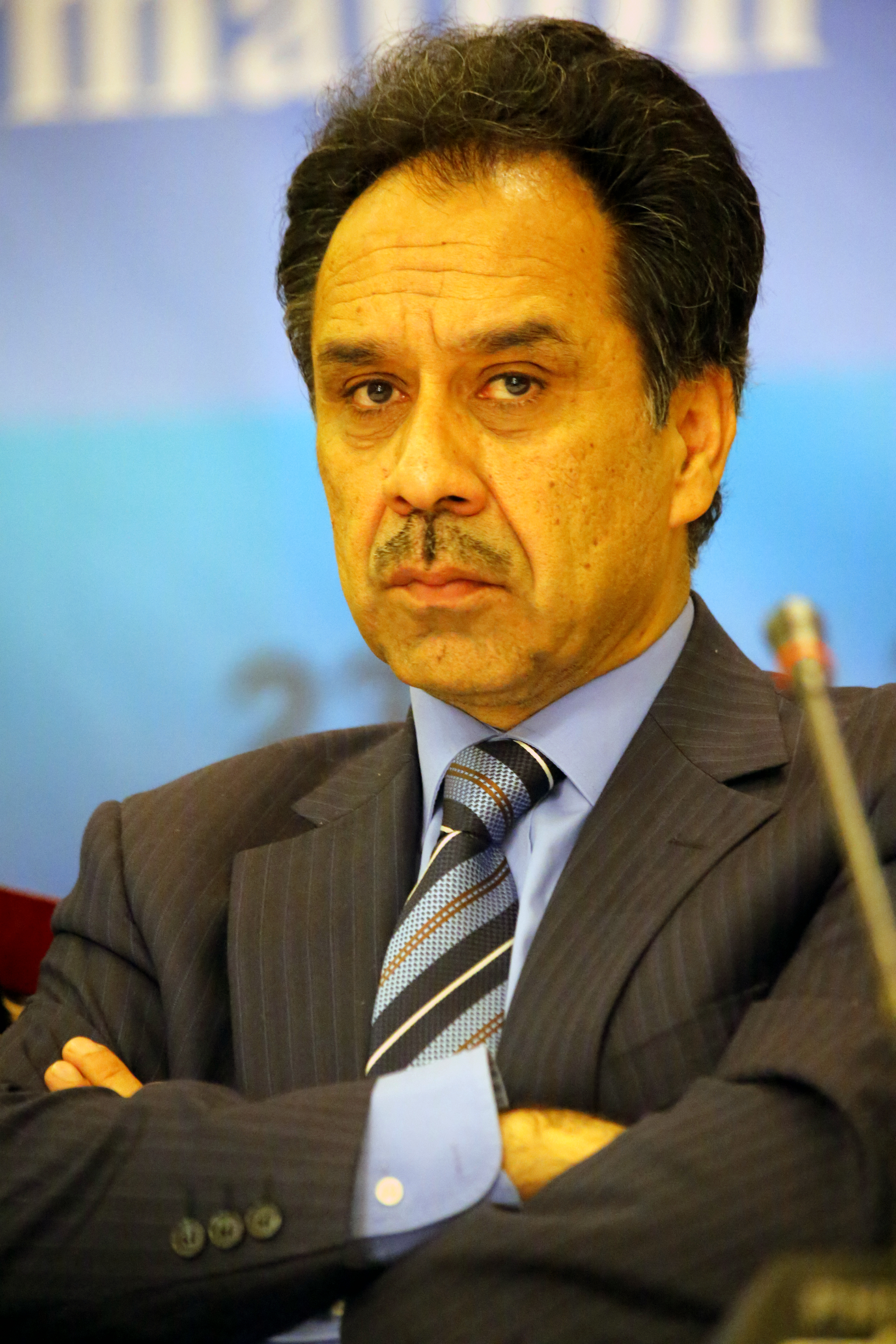
- Born: 1 November 1964 (age 61); Kabul, Kingdom of Afghanistan
- Occupations: Chairman and Founder of Massoud Foundation, Politician, Ex-Ambassador of Afghanistan to the UK

Ahmad Wali Massoud (Dari Persian: احمد ولی مسعود; born 1 November 1964) is an Afghan politician and diplomat who is the founder and chairman of the Massoud Foundation in Afghanistan. He is the younger brother of the late Ahmad Shah Massoud.

Massoud obtained a degree in diplomatic studies from University of Westminster, London in 1989. He has served as Afghan ambassador to the UK, special representative of Ahmad Shah Massoud in Europe, and the representative of the Jamiat-e Islami Party in London. He is the founder of a political party called Nahzat-e-Melli-ye Afghanistan (National Movement of Afghanistan). He is the founder of the Mandegar Daily newspaper and the history magazine Yad–e-Yar (The Memory of Friends). Massoud published the National Agenda, his first book, in 2012. In September 2021, TRT World journalist Samuel Ramani was able to speak with Massoud. During the interview, which was published in the 21 September edition of TRT World, Massoud stated that the Resistance still controls much of the Valley and downplayed the reported strength of the Taliban, which he described as "leaderless." Ramani stated that his interview with Massoud was conducted the week before it was published. During the interview, Massoud also described former Afghanistan President Ashraf Ghani's government as too corrupt to survive and also cast doubt on the notion that the Taliban had the military capacity to successfully take power without outside assistance, accusing US Special Envoy to Afghanistan Zalmay Khalilzad of having a role in orchestrating their return to power. Massoud also described Chairman of the Joint Chiefs of Staff Mark Milley's September 1, 2021 assertion that the Taliban could fight ISIS-K as "very naive."

== See also ==
- Ahmad Shah Massoud
- Ahmad Zia Massoud
- Ahmad Massoud
- Hasib Quwayi Markaz
