= The Student Basij =

Student organization associated with the Islamic Revolutionary Guard Corps

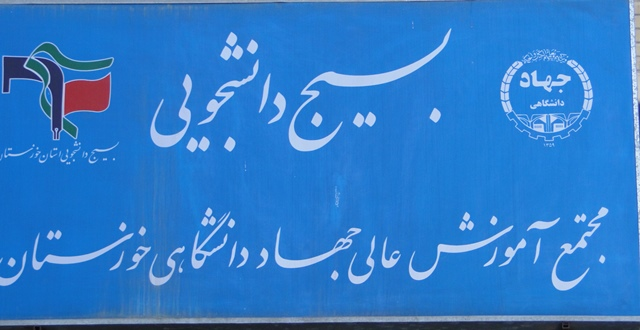
The Student Basij's board (of a university, in Khuzestan province)

The Student Basij (Persian: بسیج دانشجویی) (also known as "Student and Talabeh Basij") is a branch of the Basij militia. It is considered among the "Islamic student organizations" which was founded based on the decree of the first/previous supreme leader of Iran, Seyyed Ruhollah Khomeini on 23 November 1988, with the scope of guardianship for the principles of revolution and Islam. Among its other goals are: inviting unity and likewise the solidarity between Hawza and university, establishment of a great Islamic government and victory of the world by Islam.

After the declaration of the plan by Ruhollah Khomeini, the Supreme Council of the Cultural Revolution approved the plan; Tehran Student Basij center then became responsible for founding Basij offices at universities across Iran on 3 January 1991.

Ruhollah Khomeini said that:

"Nowadays, the Basij of Student (of the university/Hawza) is regarded among the most essential formations. The students of the Hawzas and the universities ought to do their best to defend the revolution and Islam --in the related centers; and my Basiji children --of Iran-- should be guard for the unchangeable principles of "Neither east nor west" in the aforesaid formations." He also added that: nowadays, universities and Hawzas need unity and solidarity more than everywhere. The children of the revolution never allow the accomplices of the U.S. and Soviet to have influence in the mentioned sensitive centers; and ...

== Activities and goals ==
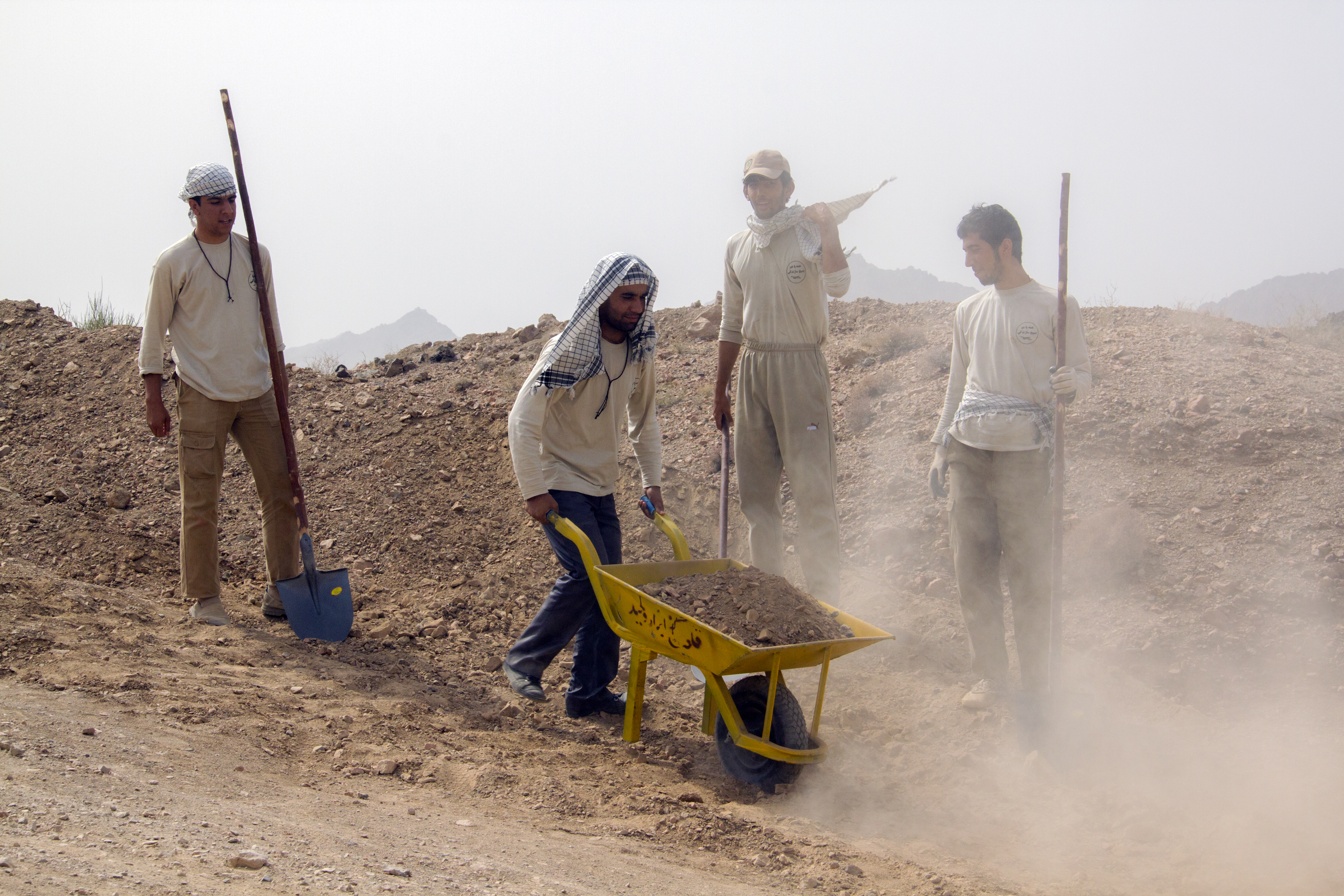
Basijis, helping in deprived areas

The Student Basij works to:

- Attraction, instruction and organizing volunteer students
- Introducing the culture of sacrifice and martyrdom for the students, and ...
- Protection and upgrade for the morale of being anti-arrogance in the students
- Holding the related needed ceremonies (memorials, conferences, etc.)
- Holding related courses, camps; also cultural, scientist and defensive classes
- Co-operation in researches expansion in the fields of culture/science/defense, in the direction of progress and building the country

== Management ==
On 23 December 2017, Mohammad Javad Nik-Ravesh of Imam Hossein University, was appointed as the head of the Student Basij. Likewise, the commanders of the Student Basij (since the start of this formation) are:

- Ali Gol-Parvar
- Seyyed Muhammad Husseini
- Ali Reza Varij-Kazemi
- Amir Reza Ahooan

== Sanctions ==
In May 2023, the Student Basij was sanctioned by the European Union, which cited it as the perpetrator of Islamic Revolutionary Guard Corps violence against student protests on university campuses in the fall of 2022.

== See also ==
- Basij
- Hezbollah (Iran)
- Islamic Revolutionary Guard Corps
