= Khorasan TV =

American satellite TV channel

- Type: Satellite television network
- Country: United States
- Availability: United States; Canada
- Owner: Hamed Qaderi
- Launch date: 2002
- Official website: www.khorasantv.com

Khorasan TV is a satellite TV channel broadcasting from the United States. Khorasan TV was founded by Hamed Qaderi in December 2002 and it started broadcasting in May 2002. Khorasan TV's office and studio is currently in Reseda, Los Angeles, California. The station is available on Galaxy 25 satellite dish throughout North America. It runs 24 hours a day and its content includes news, political and cultural discussions, and music and entertainment.

== See also ==
- List of television channels in Afghanistan
