= Salang District =

Salang سالنگ
- District
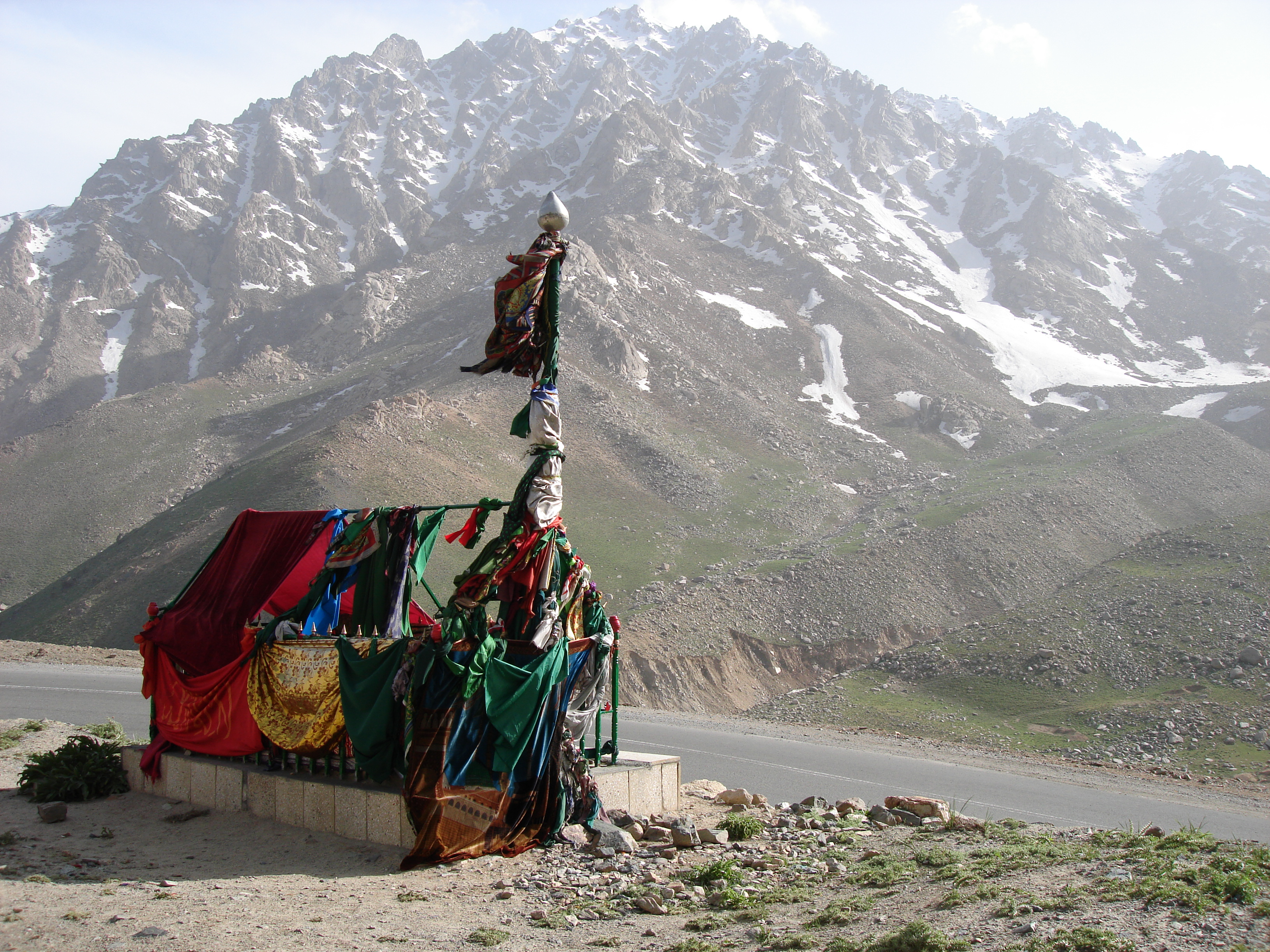
- Tomb of an Afghan martyr near Salang, 2006.

- Location in Afghanistan
- Coordinates: 35.3016°N 69.5261°E
- Country: Afghanistan
- Province: Parwan

Population
  - Religions: Islam
- Time zone: + 4.30

Salang (Dari: سالنگ) is a district of Parwan province, Afghanistan. It is located to the southern end of the Salang Tunnel. The estimated population in 2019 was 28,856.

== See also ==
- Districts of Afghanistan
