= Tashkan, Afghanistan =

Tashkan
- Location in Afghanistan
- Coordinates: 36°52′52″N 70°16′34″E
- Country: Afghanistan
- Province: Badakhshan Province
- Time zone: + 4.30

Tashkan is a District in Badakhshan Province in north-eastern Afghanistan.

== See also ==
- Badakhshan Province
- Tishkan District
