= National Resistance Front =

Afghan military organization

National Resistance Front جبهه مقاومت ملی
- Flag of the National Resistance Front
- Leader: Ahmad Massoud
- Head of Foreign Relations: Ali Nazary
- Head of the Political Bureau: Abdullah Khenjani
- Chief of Staff: Qadam Shah Shahim
- Spokesperson: Abdullah Khenjani (8 May 2026 – present); Sibghatullah Ahmadi (6 September 2021 – 8 August 2023); Muhammad Fahim Dashti † (17 August – 6 September 2021)
- Dates active: 17 August 2021 – present (5 years, 2 months and 2 days)
- Headquarters: Dushanbe, Tajikistan (political base)
- Active regions: Active in Panjshir, Parwan, Baghlan, Wardak, Daykundi, and Samangan provinces, and reported to have expanded guerilla operations into Herat, Kabul, and Takhar provinces
- Ideology: Afghan nationalism; Republicanism; Democratism; Decentralization; Counterterrorism (self-proclaimed)
- Status: Active
- Size: Unknown; NRF reported claim of 10,000 fighters
- Wars: Afghan conflict; Republican insurgency

The National Resistance Front (NRF) (Note: Dari: جبهه مقاومت ملی) is an Afghan military organization fighting the Taliban in the republican insurgency in Afghanistan. The group was founded by Ahmad Massoud following the fall of Kabul on 17 August 2021 and has been considered as the successor to the historic anti-Taliban Northern Alliance military alliance (1996–2001).

The NRF exercised de facto control over the Panjshir Valley and was the only region out of the Taliban's control until September 2021 when the Taliban seized Panjshir, forcing NRF fighters to retreat to remote valleys while Massoud subsequently sought refuge in neighboring Tajikistan. Since then, he has been leading the political operations of the NRF and working to gain support from the international community. Nevertheless, the group continues to carry out hit-and-run guerilla attacks in Afghanistan against the Taliban, with operations reported in multiple provinces beyond its original base.

The NRF's ideology consists of decentralization, and a commitment to a democratic political system that upholds human rights. The group is composed mainly of Tajiks, Hazaras and Uzbeks with a sizeable minority of anti-Taliban Pashtuns. The NRF is also allegedly supported by Tajikistan, and by some accounts, Iran and Pakistan, all of which have a complex relationship with the Taliban.

== History ==
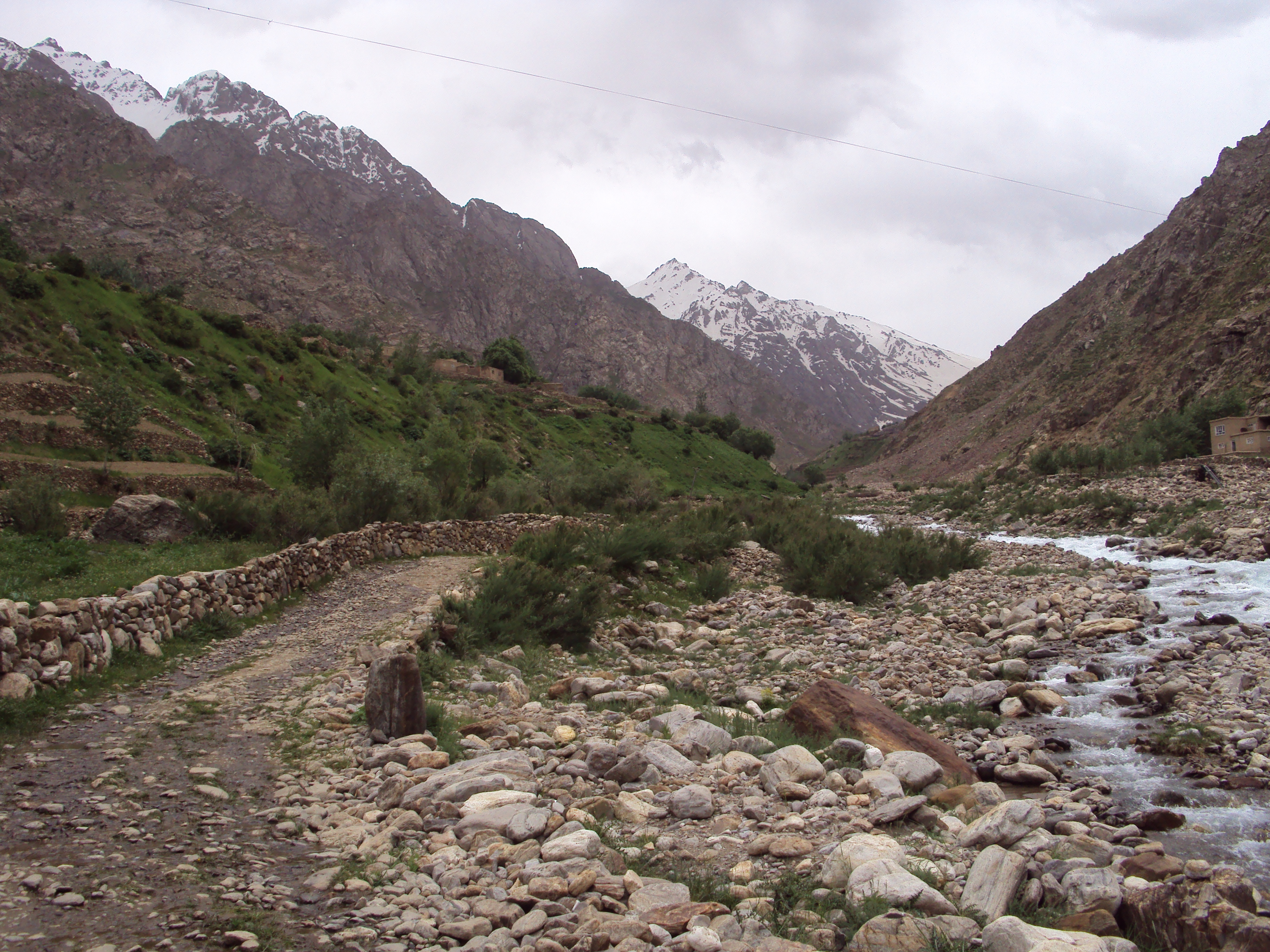
View of the Panjshir valley

A mountainous region, Panjshir was a formidable base of operations for anti-Soviet fighters and later for the original Northern Alliance.

In July 2021, during the 2021 Taliban offensive, the remnants of the Northern Alliance began mobilizing under an umbrella.

On 9 September, the NRF announced that a parallel government will be created in response to the Taliban's formation of its government in Kabul.

On 1 November, it was reported that the NRF has opened a liaison office in Washington, D.C. after being registered with the US Justice Department in order to carry out lobbying missions to various politicians working in the capital.

On 23 November, Sibghatullah Ahmadi was appointed as the new spokesman of the NRF. The position was previously held by Muhammad Fahim Dashti, who was killed during the Taliban offensive into Panjshir on 5 September. Ahmadi served in this capacity until his resignation in August 2023. Ali Nazary, the Head of Foreign Relations, subsequently became the most prominent and quoted spokesperson for the NRF in international forums, including the Vienna Process for a Democratic Afghanistan in 2025.

On 1 September 2024, Ahmad Massoud claimed in an interview that the NRF has 5,000 fighters. Massoud also highlighted the NRF's operational shift to guerrilla warfare due to the Taliban seizing approximately $8 billion worth of sophisticated U.S. military equipment during the withdrawal.

=== Coalescence in Panjshir ===
When the Taliban captured Kabul on 15 August 2021, anti-Taliban forces including those of Ahmad Massoud and Amrullah Saleh moved into the Panjshir Valley, the only area of Afghanistan not controlled by the Taliban.

Political rifts within the broader opposition led to the NRF and Jamiat-e Islami suspending cooperation with the National Council for the Salvation of Afghanistan in 2024.

As of 17 August, the Panjshir Valley was—according to one observer—"under siege on all sides" but had not come under direct attack.

On 6 September 2021, the Taliban claimed victory in controlling the province. The NRF, however, denied the Taliban victory, stating they continued to hold positions across the valley. Since then, the NRF has not controlled any territory but has continued to carry out hit and run guerrilla attacks. Although the NRF claimed over 380 successful operations in 2024, analysts confirm that these remain low-intensity attacks that have not yet achieved the ability to "change the balance of power" nationally. The NRF sustains itself primarily through the local purchase of arms, often from corrupt Taliban officials, given the lack of direct foreign military aid.

=== Baghlan and operational focus ===
On 20 August 2021, a group of anti-Taliban forces was organised in Baghlan Province, headed by Abdul Hamid Dadgar.

The NRF's operational focus has consistently shifted from Panjshir towards the Andarab valley in Baghlan and surrounding Northern provinces (Parwan, Takhar). NRF leaders emphasize that these areas, due to their mountainous terrain, are crucial for sustaining the long-term guerrilla insurgency against the Taliban's administrative control.

On 20 August 2026, NRF commander Hasib Markaz was killed by Taliban forces in Parwan province.

=== Overseas work and geopolitics ===
On 16 September 2022, Ahmad Massoud urged fellow Afghans living overseas to work together to find a way to end Taliban rule and bring them back to negotiations. On 30 November – 1 December 2022, Karen Decker, charge d'affaires of the U.S. mission to Afghanistan, attended a meeting with anti-Taliban figures in Tajikistan. On 18 February 2025, NRF leadership attended the fifth Vienna Process Conference for a Democratic Afghanistan in Austria, which brought together over 90 participants from anti-Taliban factions. The conference emphasized the NRF's commitment to a political solution centered on a national dialogue and a political roadmap for Afghanistan.

The NRF also employs a diplomatic strategy aimed at raising international concerns over Afghanistan becoming a "global terrorist haven" under the Taliban, thereby pressuring global powers to withdraw recognition and support from the de facto authorities. The Taliban's increased diplomatic activity and efforts to normalize relations with neighboring countries have complicated the NRF's ability to maintain secure "safe havens" and logistical routes in the region, particularly through Central Asian states such as Tajikistan.

== Presence ==
As of late 2024, the National Resistance Front (NRF) asserts a widespread organizational and operational presence across approximately 20 provinces of Afghanistan. This presence is overwhelmingly characterized by a strategy of guerrilla (hit-and-run) attacks rather than sustained territorial control.

The provinces where the NRF is reported to have fighters present include Panjshir, Baghlan, Parwan, Kapisa,Badakhshan, Takhar, Kunar, Kunduz, Kabul, Laghman, Nangahar, Nuristan, Samangan, Balkh, Badghis, Ghor, Herat, Farah, Nimroz, and Sar-i-Pul.

The NRF claimed to have conducted 401 targeted operations across 19 provinces from March 2024 to March 2025, claiming 651 Taliban fighters were killed. Notably, the most intense operational activity remains focused on the central and northern provinces. For instance, 126 of these claimed attacks were concentrated in Kabul province alone, demonstrating the NRF's focus on maintaining pressure on the capital. However, analysts note that the operational tempo in the western and southern provinces (such as Farah and Nimroz) largely consists of low-intensity networking and infiltration rather than high-intensity combat.

== Foreign support ==
=== Iran ===
Since 2021, some sources have claimed that Iran has provided economic, military and other assistance to the NRF as a counterweight to the Islamic Emirate; for example, NRF commanders Ahmad Massoud and Amrullah Saleh have been hosted in Iran. However, since the re-establishment of the Islamic Emirate, Iran has been strengthening its ties with the Taliban and has declared it does not support anti-Taliban militias in Afghanistan. Analysts at the Middle East Institute suggest that Tehran maintains covert logistical support and permits the political activity of NRF leaders as a strategic "leverage card" against the Taliban, particularly regarding border and water disputes, and shared concerns over IS-KP activity. Persian-language media accuses Iran of pursuing outdated interventionist policies and attempting to turn Afghanistan into a proxy battlefield for the so-called "Axis of Resistance". "This dual policy of ostensibly engaging with the Islamic Emirate while simultaneously reinforcing the opposition movement... reflects the Iranian government's confusion and strategic weaknesses".

=== Pakistan ===
Since 2024, following Pakistan's border skirmishes with the Taliban, several sources have asserted that Pakistan's Inter-Services Intelligence (ISI) may have established covert relations with the NRF. Analysts asserted Pakistan may have been backing the NRF as payback for the Taliban backing the Tehreek-e-Taliban Pakistan (TTP). This represented a significant strategic pivot where the two groups found temporary and tactical alignment against a shared enemy.

On 23 January 2025, the Afghan Taliban claimed that "terrorists" (members of the National Resistance Front of Afghanistan) were being deployed by Pakistan to Khyber Pakhtunkhwa and Balochistan in order to conduct attacks inside Afghanistan. On that same day, six Pakistan Taliban insurgents, who were attempting to infiltrate the border, were killed by Pakistani forces in Zhob District.

NRF foreign relations head Ali Nazary strongly condemned the 2025 Jaffar Express hijacking and expressed condolences to the people of Pakistan and the families of the victims. He also held the Taliban responsible for harbouring the militants (referring to the Balochistan Liberation Army) responsible for the attack, accusing them of contributing to the growing instability in the region.

In early 2025, NRF member Abdul Hafiz Mansoor stated that Pakistan had approached the NRF for negotiations and that the NRF welcomed the decision. During the 2025 Afghanistan–Pakistan conflict in October, the NRF released a statement in support of the Pakistani strikes against the Taliban on X (formerly Twitter). The NRF itself claimed responsibility for an attack on 15 October, assassinating Qari Bashir, the deputy head of the Taliban's Propagation of Virtue and the Prevention of Vice in Kunduz.

In midst of the 2026 Pakistan–Afghanistan war, the NRF released a statement on Twitter (now known as X) claiming responsibility for an attack on Taliban security forces saying:

"In an attack by National Resistance Front fighters in Kunduz, 3 Taliban terrorists were killed.

National Resistance Front forces carried out a targeted operation on a Taliban terrorist patrol vehicle on Saturday evening, March 2, 1404, as a result of which three Taliban terrorists, including a leader of the group, were killed and two other terrorists were wounded.

This attack was carried out at around 7 pm in the Kabul port area and near Kunduz airport on a vehicle carrying the commander of the Taliban terrorist group and his men, who were on a night patrol.

No National Resistance Front forces or civilians were harmed in this attack.

National Resistance Front forces plan and carry out their targeted attacks in different regions of the country against the Taliban terrorist group with the aim of freeing the country from the illegitimate domination of this terrorist group."

Fazel Ahmed Manawi, a senior NRF leader praised Pakistan for its air operations and voiced support during the war.

=== Tajikistan ===
Tajikistan, which has officially designated the Taliban as a terrorist organization since 2021, has been accused to be the main supporter of the NRF. Tajikistan continues to be the NRF's most critical political sanctuary, allowing the former Afghanistan embassy in Dushanbe to remain in the hands of the previous government (closely aligned with the NRF) and hosting opposition political conferences. Since 2025, relations between the two sides have eased, and Tajikistani officials have issued statements saying they do not support the Taliban opposition. Despite pressure from both the Taliban and Russia, Tajikistan has resisted fully normalizing relations with the Islamic Emirate, maintaining the NRF as an ongoing, though undeclared, political asset.

=== Other foreign support and funding ===
==== International ====
In the absence of direct military aid from any major state, the NRF relies on a complex network of support for its survival and operations. The primary and most stable source of financial support for the NRF comes from the Afghan diaspora residing in the West (the United States, Canada, Western Europe, Australia, and New Zealand). Funds are channeled through private networks and the traditional Hawala system to finance fighter necessities and logistics.

Russia tolerates the NRF's political activities as an anti-ISIS lever, while Western powers limit engagement to political dialogue (the Vienna Process), explicitly refusing to supply weapons to avoid fuelling a larger civil war. China, Uzbekistan, and Kazakhstan are strongly opposed to supporting the NRF, focusing instead on economic ties and security cooperation with the Taliban.

==== Domestic ====
The NRF's supply of arms depends largely on stockpiles from the previous government and purchases from the regional black market, often facilitated by corrupt Taliban personnel and smuggling networks near the Pakistan and Central Asian borders.

The NRF has also formed an operational and political union with the Afghanistan Freedom Front (AFF), aimed at consolidating military efforts and presenting a more unified opposition front in political forums.

== Analysis ==
=== Early challenges ===
Following the fall of Kabul, many international observers expressed skepticism regarding the long-term viability of the NRF. Russian Ambassador to Afghanistan Dmitry Zhirnov labelled the resistance as "doomed" and that the resistance would fail, adding that they have "no military prospects". According to The Economist, the resistance's cause looked "forlorn".

Early concerns focused on the likelihood of NRF fighters being outmatched by the Taliban, who had captured Western-made military weapons. Analyst Bill Roggio argued that the Panjshir resistance's "prospects are bleak," while Afghani specialist Gilles Dorronsoro suggested the Taliban could easily enforce a lockdown, as the NRF was not a major threat.

=== Survival and strategic shift ===
Subsequent analysis in 2024–2025 challenged the initial predictions of the NRF's immediate failure. Despite the loss of territorial control, the NRF's survival demonstrated the viability of a permanent shift toward classic guerrilla warfare across multiple northern provinces. This has turned the NRF into a persistent, but not existential, security challenge for the Taliban.

The move from holding territory to decentralized "hit-and-run" operations and reliance on small arms and IEDs has enabled longevity against the Taliban's heavier equipment. The vital need for the NRF to act as a broad coalition (as suggested by David Loyn) was confirmed by the AFF alliance and continued political engagement in forums such as the Vienna Process.

Contrary to the ambassadorial dismissal, Russia's continued political tolerance for the NRF is now viewed as a calculated strategy, preserving the NRF as an "anti-ISIS leverage card" against the Taliban to serve Moscow's security interests.

== Military structure and operations ==
Following the loss of Panjshir in 2021, the NRF restructured itself into a decentralized guerrilla force estimated to consist of 2,000 to 5,000 active fighters, mainly composed of former Afghanistan Army and police personnel.

Under Massoud's overall leadership, Qadam Shah Shahim heads the NRF's military committee. It relies on strong regional commanders who operate with high degrees of autonomy. The primary zones of guerrilla activity are the mountainous regions of Baghlan (particularly Andarab), Takhar, Parwan, and Kapisa.

Key figures include Ali Sami (active in Panjshir/Parwan) and Salahuddin Ayubi (active in Andarab). The military coordination council ensures operational coherence with allied groups similar to the NRF's cooperation with the AFF.

The NRF's logistics are entirely dependent on financial aid from the diaspora, used to purchase small arms and ammunition from the regional black market and through corrupt Taliban personnel. Reports also suggest NRF and allied forces generate limited internal funds through unofficial "taxes" or compulsory donations in their influence zones.

== Political platform and ideology ==
The NRF's political platform is centered on reversing the Taliban's centralized governance model. The NRF advocates for a non-centralized political system, with a strong preference for a federal structure to ensure equitable power distribution among Afghanistan's diverse ethnic groups in order to prevent single-group dominance.

The resistance insists on the establishment of a truly inclusive government that respects the democratic and civil rights of all citizens, particularly the rights of women and ethnic minorities. Abdullah Khenjani heads the NRF's political bureau, in concert with Ali Maisam Nazary who engages in diplomatic lobbying in Europe (such as Germany and France) and the United States, positioning the NRF as the main political alternative to the Taliban and attempting to prevent international recognition of the Islamic Emirate.

== Human rights context and civilian impact ==
While the NRF benefits from strong support among the ethnic groups of the former Northern Alliance, particularly the diaspora, continued operations also pose a challenge: civilians face pressure both from Taliban reprisals and the logistical demands of the guerrilla fighters.
