= Ahmad Massoud =

Afghan politician (born 1989)

- احمد مسعود
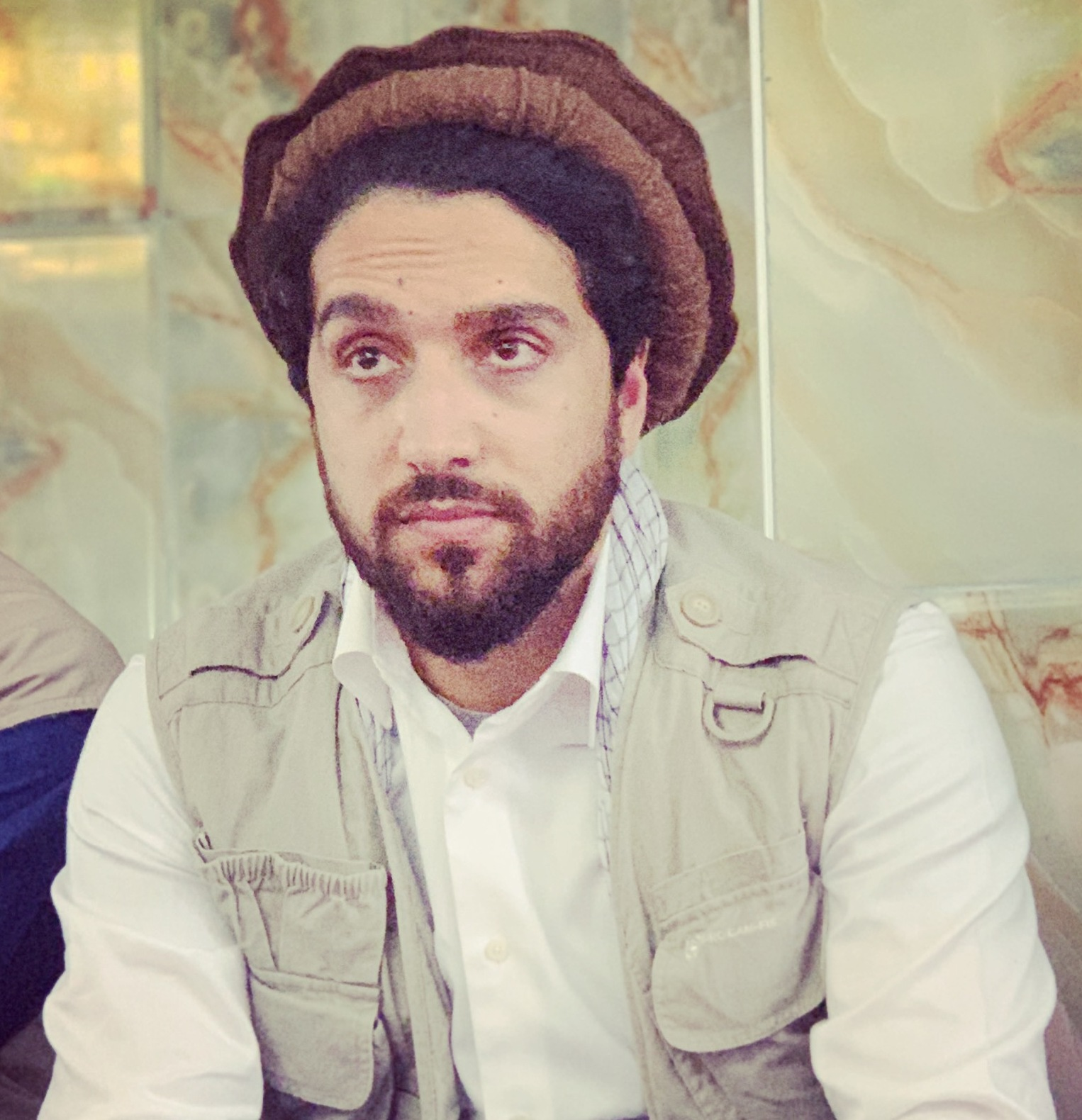
- Massoud in 2019

Leader of the National Resistance Front
- Incumbent
- Assumed office 17 August 2021
- Preceded by: Office established

Personal details
- Born: 10 July 1989 (age 37) Warsaj District, Takhar Province, Republic of Afghanistan
- Relations: Dost Muhammad Khan (grandfather); Ahmad Wali Massoud (uncle); Ahmad Zia Massoud (uncle)
- Parents: Ahmad Shah Massoud (father); Sediqa Massoud (mother)
- Education: RMA Sandhurst; King's College London; City, University of London

Military service
- Years of service: 2021–present
- Commands: National Resistance Front
- Conflicts: War in Afghanistan; Republican insurgency

Ahmad Massoud (Note: Dari: احمد مسعود, IPA: [ʔahmæd masʔuːd]) (born 10 July 1989) is an Afghan politician who is the founder and leader of the resistance group National Resistance Front (NRF) since 2021. He is the eldest child and only son of military commander Ahmad Shah Massoud.

Born to a Tajik Sunni Muslim family, Massoud was trained at the Royal Military Academy Sandhurst. He launched his political movement in September 2019 opposing President Ashraf Ghani. Massoud was a staunch critic of the Afghan peace process between the Taliban and the United States, correctly predicting that it would result in the overthrow of the Islamic Republic by the Taliban in the future. After the fall of Kabul in 2021, Massoud formed the NRF in Panjshir and initiated the republican insurgency against the Taliban. After the Taliban seized control of Panjshir, Massoud evacuated towards Tajikistan and later relocated to France where he continues to lead NRF political activities.

A supporter of a decentralized Afghanistan, Massoud is considered the leading Afghan opposition figure to the Taliban. He has participated in several conferences in working towards a democratic state in Afghanistan and bringing together leading Afghan anti-Taliban leaders, women's rights activists, and civil society representatives.

== Early life and education ==
Ahmad Massoud was born into an ethnic Tajik family in 1989. He is the only son and the oldest of Ahmad Shah Massoud's six children. His grandfather Dost Muhammad Khan, was a colonel in the Royal Afghan Army and is buried in Peshawar, Pakistan.

After attending high school in Iran, Massoud trained at the Royal Military Academy Sandhurst. In 2012, he commenced an undergraduate degree in war studies at King's College London, where he obtained his bachelor's degree in 2015. He obtained his master's degree in international politics from City, University of London in 2016. His undergraduate and postgraduate dissertation topics were the Taliban. Massoud was also fond of reading Persian poetry in his teenage years.

Massoud later returned to Afghanistan and in November 2016, was appointed CEO of the Massoud Foundation.

== Political career ==
In September 2019, Massoud launched his political movement in a rally in Panjshir attended by over 30,000 people." He has endorsed his father's idea of a Swiss model for internal power relations in Afghanistan, saying that the decentralization of government and the de-concentration of power from Kabul would give a more efficient allocation of resources and authority to provinces in the country, thereby bringing prosperity and stability to the country as a whole.

Massoud had been critical of President Ashraf Ghani and objected to the direction of the Afghan peace process in 2019, which he believed did not represent the interests of all Afghans. In September of that year, he announced the creation of a new coalition of mujahideen leaders modeled on the Northern Alliance that had resisted the Taliban in the 1990s.

In March 2021, Massoud called upon Ghani to step down as president "for the sake of Afghanistan".

=== National Resistance Front ===
After the fall of Kabul on 15 August 2021, Massoud came to Panjshir and formed the National Resistance Front (NRF) against the Taliban. Massoud appealed in the American press for military and logistical support for his forces. Among other reasons, he listed the need to protect women's rights, prevent public executions, and avoid the return of a safe haven in Afghanistan for international terrorists.

On 22 August 2021, he warned of a potential civil war if a power-sharing agreement was not reached and said that war was "unavoidable" under those circumstances, saying "We defeated the Soviet Union, we can defeat the Taliban". He founded the NRF with thousands of fighters and asked the U.S., France and others in Europe and the Arab world to support the group. He has also stated his desire to negotiate with the Taliban, but that if talks fail he is ready for a military confrontation. On 5 September, he was declared his father's successor.

On 6 September 2021, with the Taliban taking control of the Panjshir Valley, Massoud moved to an unknown location and said the resistance will continue. On 9 September, Massoud's spokesman Ali Nazary stated that both Massoud and former vice president Amrullah Saleh were "safe" and still in Afghanistan. Nazary also disputed reports that the Taliban had full control of the Province, stating that 60% was still under National Resistance Front control, and stated that NRF forces made a "tactical withdrawal" from some areas.

=== Activities in exile ===
Massoud has since been leading the NRF operations from France and participated in the Vienna conferences in working towards "a democratic Afghanistan". The meetings brought together leading Afghan anti-Taliban figures, women's rights activists, and civil society representatives.

Massoud has advocated for a strategic partnership with neighbouring Pakistan. He backed Pakistan's claim of the Afghan Taliban providing safe haven to the Pakistani Taliban. During a conference in France in November 2025, following the 2025 Afghanistan–Pakistan conflict, Massoud called on Pakistan to acknowledge its past mistakes of supporting the Afghan Taliban.

== Publications ==
=== Books ===
- Massoud, Ahmad (2023). Notre Liberté (in French). Éditions Bouquins. ISBN 9782382922354.
- Massoud, Ahmad (2024). In the Name of my Father: Struggling for Freedom in Afghanistan. Republic Book Publishers. ISBN 9781645720966.

=== Articles ===
- Massoud, Ahmad (14 April 2020). "What Is Missing From Afghan Peace Talks". The New York Times.
- ——————— (20 March 2021). "La lettre de remerciement aux Parisiens d'Ahmad Massoud, fils du commandant Massoud". Le Journal du Dimanche.
- ——————— (18 August 2021). "The mujahideen resistance to the Taliban begins now. But we need help". The Washington Post.

== Interviews ==
- Alam, Kamal; Massoud, Ahmad (12 August 2022). Ahmad Massoud reveals what's next for the Afghan resistance, one year after the Taliban's takeover. Atlantic Council.
- Coffey, Luke; Massoud, Ahmad (7 December 2022). A Conversation with Ahmad Massoud on the Future of Afghanistan. Hudson Institute.
- #121 Cmdr. Ahmad Massoud - The... - The Shawn Ryan Show
