= 2021–2022 Afghan protests =

Anti-Taliban protests in Afghanistan

2021–2022 Afghanistan protests
- Part of the Afghanistan conflict (1978–present)
- Date: 17 August 2021 – 16 January 2022 and 22–24 December 2022
- Location: Afghanistan
- Caused by: Taliban seizing control of Afghanistan; Lack of representation for women and minorities in new government
- Goals: Improvement of women's rights in Afghanistan, particularly in education.; Stopping human rights abuses committed by the Taliban
- Methods: Demonstrations, protests
- Result: Government crackdown: Protests suppressed by force

Parties
(Islamic Republic of Afghanistan) Anti-Taliban protesters Supported by: National Resistance Front	Government of Afghanistan; Afghan Army; Afghan National Police; General Directorate of Intelligence; Pro-Taliban counter-protesters

Lead figures
No centralized leadership	(Afghanistan) Hibatullah Akhundzada; (Afghanistan) Sirajuddin Haqqani

Casualties
- Deaths: At least 10 protesters
- Injuries: 100+
- Arrested: At least 6 journalists; later released

Protests in Afghanistan held by Islamic democrats and feminists against the treatment of women by the Taliban began on 17 August 2021, following the fall of Kabul. Supported by the National Resistance Front (NRF), the protesters also demanded decentralization, multiculturalism, social justice, labor, education, and food. Pro-Taliban counterprotests also took place.

The Taliban suppressed the protests with increasing violence as time went on, and began kidnapping activists. This policy ultimately resulted in the gradual end of the protests, with the last one in Kabul occurring on 16 January 2022. 2022 saw few protests until the December ban on women attending university, which led to protests in multiple cities that were quickly suppressed with force.

== Background ==
During the 2021 Taliban offensive when Taliban insurgents captured large swathes of territory and assaulted several cities, a number of civilians started pro-government protests in opposition to the Taliban. On 2 August, large numbers of people in the western city of Herat took to their rooftops, using God is the greatest as a rallying cry. The next day, similar protests spread elsewhere; Kabul residents used the same rallying cry while gathering together in the streets waving the Afghan tricolour. It came shortly after a powerful bomb blast targeting the house of the defense minister was committed by the Taliban. The protests in Herat inspired protests in the provinces of Nangarhar, Khost, Kunar and Bamiyan.

On 15 August 2021, the Taliban captured Kabul. This sent many into panic, prompting evacuations of military, embassy staff, and partially, civilians.

== Protests ==
=== 2021 ===
==== August ====
On 17 August 2021, small protests consisting of women were reported in Kabul, demanding equal rights for women.

Larger protests emerged in eastern Pashtun-inhabited cities the following day. On 18 August, the Taliban opened fire on demonstrators in Jalalabad, killing 3 and wounding more than a dozen. The Taliban had promised not to be brutal in the way they rule. Witnesses said the deaths happened when local residents tried to install Afghanistan's tricolour at a square in Jalalabad. There were also reports of people trying to plant the tricolour in the eastern cities of Khost and Asadabad.

The next day, 19 August, Afghan Independence Day, protests were reported as spreading to more cities, including large separate protests in Kabul, with 200 people gathered in one demonstration before it was broken up by force by the Taliban. Later on the 19th, some outlets reported that the protests in Kabul had swelled to thousands of protesters. There were multiple reports of the Taliban flag being torn down and replaced by the flag of the Islamic Republic of Afghanistan, and protesters were reported as flying the latter flag. Several protesters were reported killed after they were fired upon while they were waving national flags during Afghan Independence Day in Asadabad, where "hundreds of people" were described as joining the protest. In Kabul on the 19th, a procession of cars and people carried a long Afghan tricolor in a symbol of defiance. In Khost Province on the 19th, the Taliban violently broke up another protest, and declared a 24-hour curfew; meanwhile, in Nangarhar Province, a video was posted showing a bleeding protester with a gunshot wound being carried away.

Amrullah Saleh, formerly the vice president and the declared acting "caretaker" President of Afghanistan by the Panjshir resistance per the Afghan constitution in the event of the flight abroad of former President Ashraf Ghani, saluted protesters "who carry the national flag and thus stand for dignity of the nation" on 19 August. However, the priority of the US is still geared towards securing the perimeter of the airport, as well as raising the number of evacuees out of the capital Kabul, Pentagon officials disclosed.

On 20 August, Afghan women held a protest gathering about their worries for the future and about women's participation in the new government. Human rights activist Fariha Esar stated, "We will not relinquish our right to education, the right to work, and our right to political and social participation."

==== September ====
A protester in Herat

"They said I should stay at home because I don't have a mahram to accompany me to the entrance of the clinic.
~ Bano, sole breadwinner for three children.

— 'Evidence contradicts Taliban's claim to respect women's rights'
~ The Guardian,
Friday 3 Sep 2021

On 2 September, 24 women in Herat held a street protest, calling for women to be included in the Taliban government and for all working women to be allowed to return to work. One of the posters stated, "Education, work and security are our — inalienable rights". Protest organisers said that they planned for women's protests to spread across all of Afghanistan. A similar women's protest took place in Kabul on 3 September, again calling for women to be included in the government, and in other political decision-making processes. The protesters called for women to defend improvements in their rights gained during the first two decades of the twenty-first century. Another women's protest held in Kabul on the same day appeared to have been blocked by Taliban forces, according to a video circulating on online social media.

Civil rights protests continued on 4 September in Kabul, including journalists and other activists, mostly women. As they marched towards the Presidential Palace, the marchers were blocked by Taliban security forces. The Taliban terminated the march by entering the crowd, firing weapons in the air and using tear gas against the protesters. The Taliban assaulted protesters using rifle butts and metal objects. One of the protesters was knocked unconscious when hit by one of the metal objects. She later received five stitches to treat the wound. Taliban also swore at the protesters.

On 7 September, 200 people protested in front of the Pakistani Embassy in Kabul. Protest slogans included "Pakistan, Pakistan, Leave Afghanistan" and protesters called for "freedom". Taliban security forces broke up the protest by firing into the air and detained Wahid Ahmadi, a TOLOnews cameraman. On the same day, 200 people protested in Herat. The Taliban whipped protesters and shot live ammunition into the air to break up the protests. Two or three people were shot dead in the Herat protest.

On 8 September, protests took place in Kabul and Faizabad. The protests were broken up by Taliban security forces. In the Kabul protests, slogans included "A cabinet without women is a failure" and women called for equal rights and "women in government". Women participants in the protest were whipped, tasered, beaten and verbally abused by the Taliban security forces. One female protester said that she was not scared of the Taliban and would continue to participate in protests, stating "It is better to die once than die gradually." Five journalists of the Afghan newspaper Etilaatorz were detained at the 8 September protest, with two hospitalised due to injuries.

==== October ====
Minor protests continued in October, although they diminished in numbers. Foreign policy expert Fabien Baussart argued that Afghan women's protests were weakening in the face of increasing Taliban suppression. A small group of women activists gathered for a protest in Kabul in late October.

==== December ====
On 26 December, hundreds of civilians from Anaba district, Panjshir went out to protest in response to the killing of Mohammad Agha by Taliban-affiliated militants. The victim was allegedly not associated with the National Resistance Front, however some reports stated that he served as a police officer in the previous Afghan government, who returned to his home believing in the promise of amnesty for those associated with the previous government given by the Taliban after the Fall of Kabul. Local Taliban officials confirmed the killing, claiming it was a misunderstanding, while promising to prosecute the perpetrators of the killing. In response to the killing, hundreds of civilians marched to the governor's office, chanting anti-Taliban slogans like "death to the Taliban" and "long live Ahmad Massoud". While the motives for the killing of Mohammad Agha have not been confirmed, the Taliban had been engaging in numerous summary executions and forced disappearances of former members of Afghan security forces, with the victim count being over 100 as of November 2021, contrary to the promise of amnesty given to former government associates by the Taliban. The incident also allegedly occurred days after an attack conducted by the NRF in Panjshir against the Taliban. The deputy chief of security of Panjshir Abdul Hamid Khurasani was reported to have clashed with the protesters, although no casualties were reported.

On 28 December, female activists organized a protest in Kabul with banners demanding respect for women's rights, work, education, and food. This was in reaction to the Taliban government further restricting the rights of Afghan citizens, forbidding women from travelling alone for more than 72 kilometers from their homes and banning music in taxis. The protesters tried to enter the building of the Ministry for the Promotion of Virtue and Prevention of Vice (which had hosted the Women's Affairs Ministry before the Taliban takeover), whereupon Taliban security forces fired warning shots into the air and dispersed the crowd. One participant claimed that several protesters were injured.

=== 2022 ===
There were new protests in January 2022. Residents of Maymana denounced the arrest of Uzbek Taliban commander Makhdoom Alam by the security forces, while women protested in Kabul against the restriction of their freedoms. After another protest march in Kabul on 16 January, Taliban abducted two women activists, Tamana Zaryabi Paryani and Parwana Ibrahimkhel. Taliban government spokesman Zabihullah Mujahid responded to the incident by denying the kidnappings at the same time as warning that the government would arrest dissidents "because [turmoil] disrupts peace and order". In the next weeks, Taliban kidnapped several more women activists, protesters, and relatives of the former. In addition, Taliban responses to protests became more violent, with security forces beating up protesters, destroying their placards, and openly threatening them with death or torture.

Faced with the disappearance of at least eight Afghan women's rights activists by 8 February, many others went into hiding out of fear for their lives. As a result, protests appeared to be suppressed by this point.

Starting on 22 December 2022, women protested the ban issued that week on female students attending university. Protests occurred in Kabul, Takhar Province, and Herat. They were quickly suppressed with arrests and force including beatings, with the last one being suppressed with a water cannon in Herat on 24 December.

== Taliban response ==
Despite promises of moderation, Taliban forces were reported to have assaulted journalists who were covering the August protests in Jalalabad and Kabul.

On 19 August, the Taliban urged Muslim clergy to tell their congregants to remain in the country and counter "negative propaganda" on Thursday, and urged Afghans to go back to work. The Taliban also called on the Imams ahead of the Friday prayers, to convince people against leaving the country.

== Solidarity protests ==
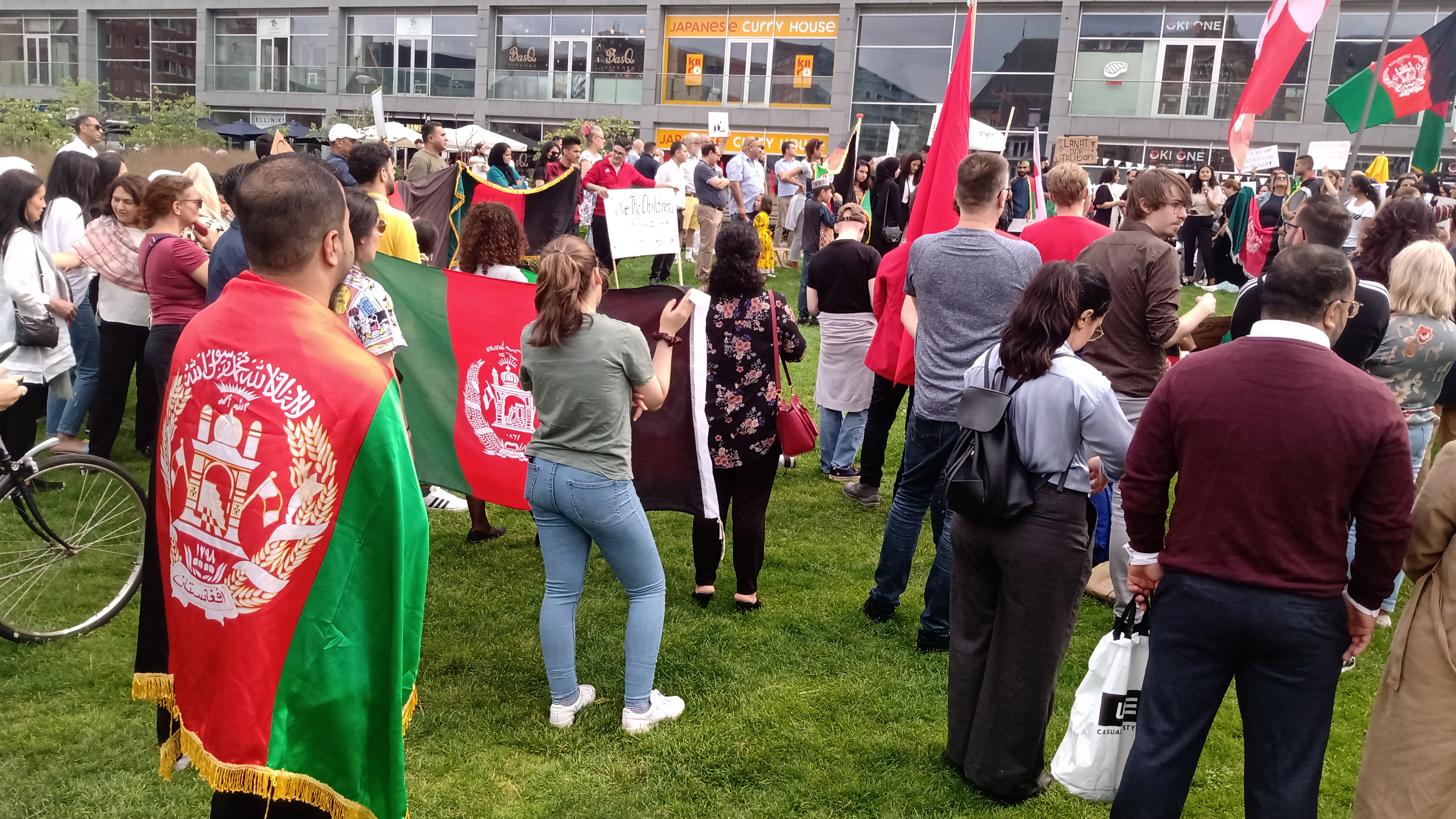
Anti-Taliban rally in Rotterdam, 21 August 2021

In Canada, several Canadians took to the streets to express their support for evacuees that were left in Afghanistan, following the federal government's decision to end its evacuation mission.

In Athens, hundreds of Afghans rallied to the US embassy calling on the international community for peace.

== See also ==
- 2021 anti-Pakistan protests
- Afghan civil disobedience movements in the 2010s:
  - Tabassum movement
  - Enlightenment Movement
  - Uprising for Change
  - People's Peace Movement
