= Afghan peace process =

Peace processes of the armed conflict in Afghanistan since 1978

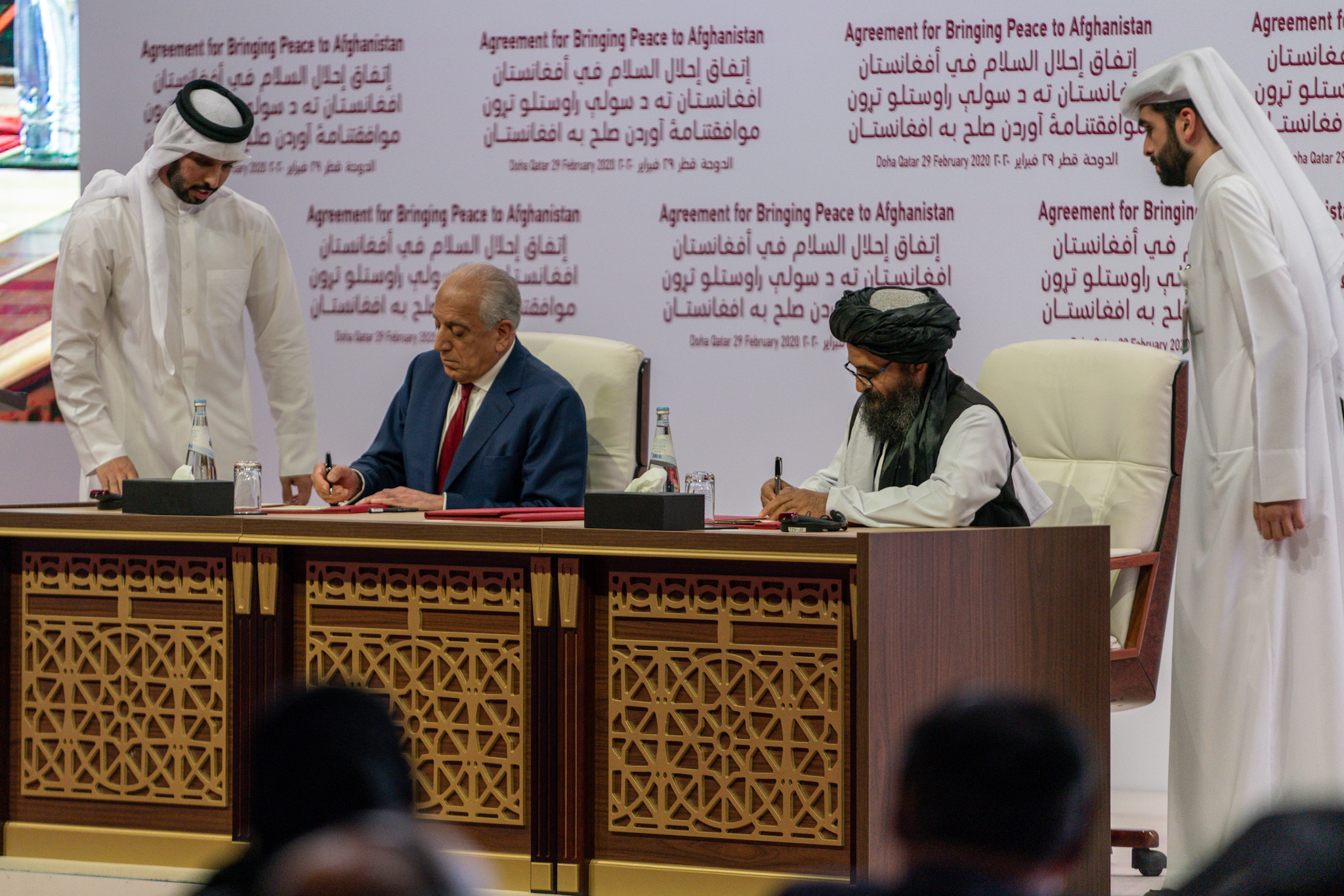
US representative Zalmay Khalilzad (left) and Taliban representative Abdul Ghani Baradar (right) sign the US–Taliban deal in Doha, Qatar on 29 February 2020.

Peace processes have taken place during several phases of the Afghanistan conflict, which has lasted since the 1978 Saur Revolution.

The National Reconciliation Policy during the Karmal and Najibullah governments from the mid-1980s to 1992 had modest results.

A "victor's peace" in the 2001 Bonn Agreement followed the US invasion of Afghanistan. During the Hamid Karzai presidency (2004–2014), local peace deals took place without high-level support, weakly effective disarmament, demobilization and reintegration programs were organised, and the Afghan Independent Human Rights Commission proposed an Action Plan for Peace, Reconciliation and Justice for transitional justice that was formally adopted by the Afghan government in 2005, to little practical effect. During the Ashraf Ghani presidency, nonviolent resistance movements in Afghanistan, including the Tabassum movement in 2015, the Enlightenment Movement during 2016–2017, Uprising for Change in 2017, and the People's Peace Movement in March 2018, were active and a brief ceasefire between government forces and the Taliban was held during 16–18 June by both sides simultaneously. The US–Taliban deal, resulting from negotiations starting in 2018 in Doha, led to the withdrawal of US forces from Afghanistan, the collapse of the Afghan Army, and the August 2021 Fall of Kabul to the Taliban.

Violent resistance continued following the Taliban 2021 takeover. The United States Institute of Peace (USIP) argued that a peace process continued to be necessary. On 5 September 2021, Ahmad Massoud of the National Resistance Front of Afghanistan involved in the Republican insurgency in Afghanistan called for a mutual ceasefire between the insurgency and the Taliban.

== Democratic Republic ==
During the government of the People's Democratic Party of Afghanistan, the National Reconciliation Policy was developed from the mid-1980s to 1992 by two successive Afghan leaders, Babrak Karmal and Mohammad Najibullah, aiming to end the armed conflict with the Mujahideen and integrate the Mujahideen into a multi-party political process; to get the Soviet Union security forces to withdraw from Afghanistan; and to develop a new constitution.

Peace processes used to negotiate between government and Mujahideen included non-aggression or other peace agreements with local commanders, discussion of the proposed agreements at district level, and proposals such as disarmament, demobilization and reintegration of fighters into their local communities. Factors creating difficulties included Afghan distrust for Najibullah as a former head of the Afghan intelligence agency; support by regional and global powers for exiled opposition leaders; the time scale needed for peace and reconciliation processes. The 1988 Geneva Accords did not require political processes to link with these local peace arrangements; it was limited to withdrawal of Soviet forces from Afghanistan.

== 1990s ==
Afghan and international non-governmental organizations (NGOs) were involved in peace processes, in connection with local peace councils and traditional jirga and shura meetings, starting in the 1990s. The NGOs claimed that these local peace processes were necessary as a grassroots complement to national level top-down processes.

== Bonn agreement (2001) ==
The 2001 Bonn Agreement, signed during the December 2001 Bonn Conference, was widely seen as a "victor's peace", since it excluded the Taliban and was constrained by United States (US) military aims. Disarmament, demobilization and reintegration, transitional justice and human rights were seen as low priorities in the 2001 Bonn peace process. The process included iterative steps for broadening inclusivity through a constitutional assembly and elections. The four Afghan groups who negotiated were the Northern Alliance and three exile-based groups; one based in Rome and linked to former King of Afghanistan Mohammed Zahir Shah; one based in Cyprus and linked to Iran; and one mainly Pashtun group based in Peshawar. The main mediator of the agreement was Lakhdar Brahimi.

Two consequences of the Bonn Agreement were the Taliban insurgency and empowerment of warlords. The exclusion of the Taliban in the Bonn Agreement led to the Taliban insurgency by 2003. In 2006, Brahimi described the exclusion of the Taliban as "our original sin". The peace process also resulted in giving strong positions to warlords with track records of war crimes and other serious human rights abuses. A common causal factor, according to Astri Suhrke, of both the Bonn Agreement itself and the Agreement's consequences were the political and military priorities of the United States. Suhrke argues that by 2018, international consensus was that peace processes based on human rights were more sustainable than processes that ended violence without being based on human rights.

== Karzai presidency ==
Several peace processes took place during the presidency of Hamid Karzai (2004–2014), including local peace processes in Helmand province, the emergence of grassroots nonviolent resistance movements in the mid-2010s, and the successive and weakly effective disarmament, demobilization and reintegration and Disbandment of illegal armed groups programs. The Afghanistan Peace and Reintegration Program started in 2010. Transitional justice was not included in peace processes during the Karzai presidency.

=== AIHRC transitional justice plan ===
The Afghan Independent Human Rights Commission (AIHRC) carried out a survey of Afghans' experience of the war since 1978 and how they wished to see transitional justice implemented. The AIHRC published the results, A Call for Justice, in January 2005. With support from the President's Office, UNAMA, the European Union and The Netherlands, AIHRC published its Action Plan for Peace, Reconciliation and Justice for transitional justice. The Action Plan was formally adopted by the Afghan government in December 2005, and included as a benchmark in the Afghanistan Compact established in 2006. A five-member advisory panel for the Action Plan was created in late 2006. As of 2013, the Action Plan had had very little practical effects.

=== Local Helmand peace processes (2006, 2010) ===
Local peace processes in Musa Qala in 2006 and in Sangin in 2010 took place between local governments and local armed groups aligned with the Taliban. The Musa Qala agreement included a 14-point written agreement. Factors that terminated the resulting peace deal included opposition from the national government and an International Security Assistance Force (ISAF) killing of a local Taliban commander near the zone of the negotiated peace agreement.

In Upper Sangin Valley (USV), a peace agreement was negotiated in May 2010. It was not supported by the local British Provincial Reconstruction Team (PRT), and in August 2010 an unsuccessful drone strike aimed at a local commander led to failure of the agreement. A new peace agreement in USV was achieved in December 2010 and witnessed by US Marine Corps and PRT representatives. Factors in the failure of the second USV peace agreement included destabilisation by US forces and a lack of support by the national government.

Significant reductions in violence occurred while the Musa Qala and Upper Sangin Valley peace agreements were in place.

=== Afghan peace movement ===
In the mid-2010s, nonviolent resistance movements in Afghanistan, which date back to the nonviolent resistance movement Khudai Khidmatgar that in the 1930s opposed the British colonial government, resurged according to United States Institute of Peace researchers. Afghan peace groups started pressuring both the Afghan government and the Taliban for ceasefires and to implement other steps in the peace process. The Tabassum movement arose in 2015, the Enlightenment Movement during 2016–2017, Uprising for Change in 2017, and the People's Peace Movement started in March 2018. The People's Peace Movement saw regional and global powers as a cause of continued war.

=== DDR, DIAG and APRP ===
DDR

A program of disarmament, demobilization and reintegration (DDR) took place in Afghanistan from October 2003 to February 2005, with the aim of disarming, demobilizing and reintegrating the Mujahideen, referred to as the Afghan Militia Forces (AMF), into mainstream civil society. The DDR program was described as "the de facto peace process" by Afghan civil society groups meeting in Berlin in 2004, who also expressed scepticism about whether the DDR process would really occur. Japanese officials were responsible for coordinating the program. The program itself had been intended to start in May 2003, but was delayed by a dispute about the number of AMF forces coordinated by the Ministry of Defence (MOD). The MOD claimed to have 250,000 AMF members while the initial DDR plan was to disarm, demobilise and reintegrate 100,000 AMF members. The difference was attributed to ghost soldiers, who existed fictitiously for commanders to collect extra salaries. The MOD accepted, in principle, that ten percent of the demobilised AMF members would constitute the new Afghan armed forces.

The conversion of forces from the AMR to police forces and private militias (not covered by the DDR program) was a major factor weakening the effects of DDR. The main success of DDR was the confiscation and storage of heavy weapons. A major failure was that it didn't break command and control structures between mid-level commanders and their forces. After DDR finished in February 2005, 1496 illegal armed groups remained.

DIAG

DDR was followed, from 2006 to March 2011, by a new program, Disbandment of illegal armed groups (DIAG). DIAG was controlled directly by Afghan officials in the Disarmament & Reintegration Committee, headed by Karim Khalili, with support from foreign officials. DIAG was generally seen as ineffective, mostly disarming small and less powerful armed groups rather than major ones. Armed groups frequently collected old weapons from ordinary civilians and gave these to the authorities instead of giving up their own modern weapons; this had the double effect of not genuinely disarming the militias, and of disarming ordinary citizens, making them easy targets for the militias.

In 2011, DIAG was integrated into the Afghanistan Peace and Reintegration Program (APRP). According to the official statistics, 759 illegal armed groups had been disarmed while 737 illegal armed groups remained armed.

APRP

The Afghanistan Peace and Reintegration Program (APRP) was a peace program created in 2010, based on the recommendations of Afghan Peace Jirga 2010, with the aim of strengthening administrative and security institutions for promoting peace and reintegration; developing the political conditions conducive to peace; and strengthening national, regional and global support for peace and stability. Conditions for Taliban participation included ending violence, breaking ties with international terrorist groups and accepting the 2004 Constitution of Afghanistan, including the constitution's protections for women's rights and minorities. APRP aimed to negotiate with the Taliban in parallel with reintegrating lower level commanders and fighters. The APRP concluded in March 2016.

The Afghan High Peace Council was created as a 70-member body (including nine women), together with a Joint Secretariat, to oversee the implementation of APRP. The peace process was intended to included a stage of community level contact with Taliban and other insurgent groups; disarmament and demobilization; and National Community Recovery, with the goals of sustainable development and social justice.

In practice, the APRP excluded political, tribal, religious leaders and informal local political institutions, and strengthened the exclusion of women, war victims and civil society groups. Women were excluded from both the design and implementation of APRP.

At the national level of APRP processes, meetings between the Joint Secretariat and women were judged by the numbers of meetings held, not for the actual impact of the meetings on the peace process. The Afghan government's negligence of women's significant participation in the peace process was seen as allowing Taliban to see women as irrelevant. Among the few women in the APRP design team, several received threats of violence and verbal or sexual abuse; some were injured after having been warned. During the Ashraf Ghani presidency, Ghani promised women to be fully included in the peace process, but that he would not "bother them until the right time". Out of 23 rounds of peace talks from 2005 to 2014, women were present in only two of the rounds.

The Joint Secretariat met with human rights activists and other civil society representatives after the APRP design had been set. The number of meetings was counted, and the impact of the meetings was not monitored.

The National Community Recovery phase of the APRP involved arming Afghanistan Local Police to protect local communities, with the risk of rearming formerly disarmed fighters in structures that were perceived as not being loyal to local communities or the national governmental system. Those former fighters who remained unarmed feared for their own safety from revenge by "both sides". Women partners of Taliban fighters were not given any rights in the reintegration process into local communities. The Provincial Peace Committees (PPC) formally required a minimum of three women participants in each committee. Women members of the HPC and the PPCs participated in conferences and seminars for confidence-building.

As of 2013, the APRP contributed to giving an impression that impunity for war crimes under an amnesty was a necessary part of a peace process, rather than encouraging transitional justice.

== Ghani presidency ==
Several peace processes took place during the presidency of Ashraf Ghani (2014–2021), including termination of APRP, transfer of authority from the Afghan High Peace Council to the State Ministry for Peace, the Gulbuddin agreement, and the three-day government–Taliban ceasefire in June 2018 that accompanied the Helmand peace convoy of the People's Peace Movement. The US–Taliban deal, resulting from negotiations starting in 2018 in Doha, led to the withdrawal of US forces from Afghanistan, the collapse of the Afghan Army, and the August 2021 Fall of Kabul to the Taliban.

=== APRP and State Ministry for Peace ===
The APRP program finished in 2017 during the Ghani presidency. APRP officially reintegrated 11,074 insurgents and commanders into civilian life. In July 2019, the Afghan High Peace Council was closed and its authority was transferred to the State Ministry for Peace.

=== Gulbuddin agreement ===
While local peace deals had been signed in 2006 and 2010, on 22 September 2016, a national-level draft peace deal was signed between the Afghan government and the Hezb-e Islami Gulbuddin militant group.

=== 2018–August 2021 ===
From April to June 2018, the People's Peace Movement held a peace march, called the "Helmand peace convoy", across Afghanistan, in reaction to a car bombing on 23 March 2018 in Lashkar Gah that had killed 14 people. The marchers called for a ceasefire at least two days long. They marched through Taliban-controlled territory. Arriving in Kabul on 18 June, they protested outside UNAMA offices and nearby embassies and met with president Ashraf Ghani.

On 5 June 2018, Ghani announced an unconditional ceasefire with the Taliban until 20 June, the end of Ramadan. During 16–18 June, both sides simultaneously held to the ceasefire.

US–Taliban deal

On 29 February 2020, following negotiations between US and Taliban negotiators that had started in Doha in 2018, a US–Taliban agreement that called for prisoner exchange and the withdrawal of US forces, the US–Taliban deal, was signed. The deal led to the withdrawal of US forces from Afghanistan, the collapse of the Afghan Army, and the August 2021 Fall of Kabul to Taliban forces.

== Islamic Emirate ==
Following the Taliban taking power in 2021, the United States Institute of Peace (USIP) argued that a peace process continued to be necessary. USIP stated that, "Violent resistance has percolated across the country, with ousted former military leaders, ethnic militia commanders and extremist groups like the local branch of the Islamic State all keen to contest the Taliban's authority."

On 5 September 2021, Ahmad Massoud, leader of the National Resistance Front of Afghanistan involved in the Republican insurgency in Afghanistan that started following the Taliban takeover, called for a mutual ceasefire between the insurgency and the Taliban, to be mediated by the Ulema council of religious scholars.
