= July 2016 Kabul bombing =

Twin bombings in Kabul, Afghanistan

- Part of the War in Afghanistan (2001–2021)
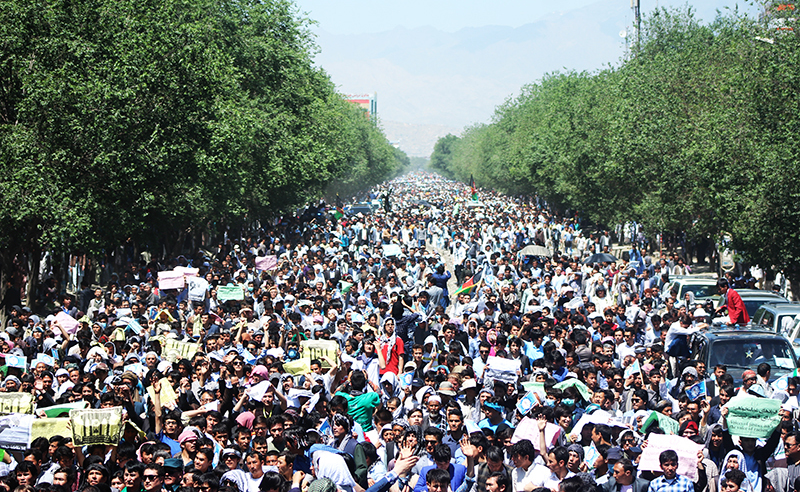
- A few hours before the bombing

- Location: 34°32′N 69°10′E; Dehmazang Square, Kabul, Afghanistan
- Date: 23 July 2016 c. 14:30 AFT (UTC+04:30)
- Target: Shia Muslims
- Attack type: Suicide bombing
- Deaths: 97+
- Injuries: 260
- Perpetrator: Islamic State - Khorasan Province
- Motive: Anti-Shi'ism

On 23 July 2016, a twin bombing occurred in the vicinity of Deh Mazang square in Kabul, capital of Afghanistan, when Enlightenment Movement protesters, mostly from the Hazara ethnic group, were marching against a decision to bypass their region in the development of the TUTAP mega power project. At least 97 people were killed and 260 injured. The terrorist group Islamic State claimed responsibility; however, the same group later on refused it. Some Hazara protestors allege that Afghan president Ashraf Ghani was behind the attack. They believe that Ashraf Ghani government was abetting the terrorists who were responsible for the attack. They also allege that the government officials were preventing the wounded from being shifted to the hospital.

The attack was the deadliest in Kabul since 2001 but was surpassed by a truck bombing in May 2017. Afghan President Ashraf Ghani, in a live television address, declared the following day (24 July) a day of national mourning and promised action against the culprits. In tribute to the victims, Ghani renamed the Dehmazang Square, where the attack took place, to Enlightenment Martyrs' Square.

== Background ==
The Hazaras are the third largest ethnic group of Afghanistan, mostly Shia, forming between 19 and 25% of the Afghan population, which is mostly Sunni. Hazaras have been subject to discrimination and genocides since the establishment of the current Afghan state by Emir Abdur Rahman Khan in 1919. The Hazara community has long been persecuted by the Taliban, who came to power in 1996, overall resulting in thousands killed.

The TUTAP (Turkmenistan-Uzbekistan-Tajikistan-Afghanistan-Pakistan) is a multimillion-dollar power project backed by the Asian Development Bank and World Bank to make electricity accessible to more people in Afghanistan. The project's initial assessment recommended the TUTAP route through the Bamyan Province, a Hazara populated province in the Central Highlands, but in 2016 the government of Afghanistan re-routed it via Salang Pass.

The Hazara of Afghanistan protested against the decision to re-route the TUTAP project. The community believed that the decision to re-route was politically motivated and its objective was to bypass some of the most underdeveloped areas which were predominantly occupied by Hazara communities. The civil activists of Kabul created a coordination group, the Enlightenment Movement (Dari: جنبش روشنایی), in early May and called for the government to reverse its decision. The government refused, and marches were held in Kabul and elsewhere around Afghanistan on 16 May 2016. Subsequent negotiations between the protesters and government officials were inconclusive. Therefore, a second peaceful demonstration was organised on 23 July 2016.

Thousands of people attended the demonstration on 23 July 2016. It started west of Kabul at around 07:00 and ended at Deh Mazang Square, where the government had placed containers and trucks to stop demonstrators from marching towards the presidential palace. Protesters were planning to make camp here at the end of the protest.

Before the march, the government had warned organizers of the possibility of an attack. The government had also blocked the route of the protestors with shipping containers.

The Islamic State (IS) is a Syria-based terror group who have committed various attacks against civilians on the Eurasian continent. IS's Afghanistan branch is small, based in the country's east near the Pakistani border. In March 2016, Afghan president Ashraf Ghani claimed that the group was 'wiped out of Afghanistan', after the group failed to expand and pose a serious threat to the government.

== Bombings ==
At 14:30, two militants detonated explosive belts when protesters were returning home at the end of the demonstrations. Security agencies claim they had intelligence reports warning about movement of bombers. CNN reported, citing Afghan police, that a third attacker was killed before detonating his bomb, though only two attackers were described in the claim of responsibility.

== Reactions ==
=== Supranational bodies ===
- United Nations – Secretary General Ban Ki-moon and Tadamichi Yamamoto, Special Representative of Secretary-General for Afghanistan and the head of the UN Assistance Mission for Afghanistan (UNAMA) condemned the terror attack on a peaceful demonstration in Kabul, describing the attack a "despicable crime".
- United Nations - President of the 70th session of the General Assembly Mogens Lykketoft also expressed shock at the killings and said that Afghanistan continued to struggle with the very grave consequences of the civil war and violent extremism.

=== Countries ===
- Iran – Foreign Minister Mohammad Javad Zarif condemned the attack and expressed condolences to the Afghan government and people.
- Pakistan – Prime Minister Nawaz Sharif strongly condemned the attack in Kabul and expressed deep grief over loss of human lives and reiterated solidarity with the government and people of Afghanistan.
- India – President Pranab Mukherjee condemned the perpetrators of the incident and extended condolences to the families whose beloved lost their lives in twin blasts and prayed for recovery of people wounded.
- Turkey – Foreign Ministry strongly condemned that terrorist attack and wished God's mercy on those who lost their lives.
- United States – White House Press Secretary Josh Earnest stated that United States "in the strongest terms" condemned the attack in Kabul, because it targeted people at a peaceful demonstration.

=== Domestic ===
- The Taliban, the predominant anti-government group in Afghanistan, denied any involvement in the attack and in a statement posted on their website termed the attack "a plot to ignite civil war". In a rare expression, the Taliban joined the Afghan government in condemning the attack.

== Aftermath ==
=== United Nations special report on the attack ===
On 18 October 2016, the United Nations Assistance Mission in Afghanistan (UNAMA) issued a special human rights report "Attack on a Peaceful Demonstration in Kabul, 23 July 2016" following months of its investigation into the attack. In the report, the Mission concluded that the attack on the peaceful demonstration not only deliberately targeted civilians but also was a serious violation of international humanitarian law, which may amount to a war crime. The report reviewed the context of the demonstration, the planning and preparedness of Afghan Security Forces, their behaviour during the demonstration and immediate response to the attack and its aftermath. It also raised, where relevant, human rights concerns for authorities. The report also offered recommendations on the respect for fundamental human rights of all Afghans, including the rights of religious and ethnic communities, as well as the need for the completion and implement of a strategy to prevent violent extremism.

== See also ==
- List of terrorist incidents linked to Islamic State – Khorasan Province
- List of terrorist incidents in July 2016
- List of Islamist terrorist attacks
- List of terrorist incidents linked to the Islamic State
- 30 June 2016 Afghanistan bombings
- Kabul attack on Canadian Embassy Guards
- Kunduz-Takhar highway hostage crisis
- Persecution of Hazara people
- List of terrorist attacks in Kabul
