= 30 June 2016 Afghanistan bombings =

Terrorist attack

- Part of War in Afghanistan (2015–2021)
- Location: Wardak province, Afghanistan, outside of Kabul
- Date: June 30, 2016
- Deaths: 40+ (+2)
- Injuries: 50
- Perpetrator: Two Taliban suicide bombers
- Motive: Terrorism

On June 30, 2016, at least 40 people were killed and 50 people were wounded after two Taliban suicide bombers attacked police cadets returning from a graduation ceremony west of the capital city, Kabul. The attacks followed the Kabul attack on Canadian Embassy Guards and occurred during the Kunduz-Takhar highway hostage crisis. The attacks all occurred during the holy month of Ramadan.

== Events ==
Outside the capital, two suicide bombers approached a police convoy carrying police cadets who had recently graduated at a ceremony on the city's western outskirts. After the first bomber attacked the bus, rescuers began to arrive. The second assailant then drove a suicide car bomb into the area where the first incident occurred, which was surrounded by emergency vehicles. Two people who were not police cadets then died, said Governor Musa Khan. The bombers specifically targeted Afghan policemen during the attack, another in a string of attacks on government workers.

President Ashraf Ghani called the bombings a "crime against humanity". He was angry about the killing of innocent citizens of his nation, especially during a holy month which many of them celebrate.

== See also ==
- List of Islamist terrorist attacks
- List of terrorist incidents, January–June 2016
- Kabul attack on Canadian Embassy Guards
- Kunduz-Takhar highway hostage crisis
- July 2016 Kabul bombing
