= People's Peace Movement (Afghanistan) =

Grassroots organization

The People's Peace Movement or Helmand Peace Convoy is a nonviolent resistance grassroots group in Afghanistan, created in March 2018 after a suicide car bomb attack on 19 March in Lashkargah, Helmand Province. The PPM calls for the military forces of both the government of Afghanistan and the Taliban to implement a ceasefire and advance the Afghan peace process. The group marched across Afghanistan to Kabul, where it met leaders of both parties and conducted sit-ins in front of diplomatic posts, before continuing its march to Balkh and Mazar-i-Sharif, arriving in September 2018.

== Background ==
Nonviolent resistance movements in Afghanistan include Khudai Khidmatgar in the 1930s, and in the 2010s, the Tabassum movement in 2015, the Enlightenment Movement during 2016–2017 and Uprising for Change in 2017. People's Peace Movement is named as unprecedented nonviolent movement in recent Afghan history by International Center on Nonviolent Conflict.

== Creation ==
The People's Peace Movement was created in Helmand Province after a car bomb suicide attack in Lashkargah killed 17 civilians on 19 March 2018. Activists held a protest in Lashkargah against the killings, calling for peace, not revenge, and were joined by parents of the victims. The activists planned a march to spread their message, to which the Taliban objected. On 29 March, the activists stated that they would start a hunger strike until the government and Taliban forces declared a ceasefire of at least two days. Other sit-ins took place around Afghanistan to support the Lashkargah protestors.

A month later, eight of them started a march towards Kabul, walking through local villages and talking to the residents. In June 2018, they marched from Maidan Wardak Province to Ghazni, reaching a total of 65 participants. The marchers regularly stopped at mosques to hold talks with locals, who typically provided food for the marchers. The size of the group grew to 100, arrived in Kabul on 18 June, and presented demands for a peace process to the government and to the Taliban. The marchers met with Afghan President Ashraf Ghani personally. They held sit-ins in front of diplomatic offices and embassies in protest at the government's and Taliban's refusal to declare a ceasefire. The march then continued to Balkh and Mazar-i-Sharif, arriving in September.

== Leadership and membership ==
During 2018 and 2019, one of PPM's main leaders were Iqbal Khyber (or Khaibar). Qais Hashemi, a Pashto poet promoted the main narrative along with Sharif Alizai who used the influence of media and other civil society networks to grow awareness and garner support for the movement. Many other individuals also contributed to the move.

Women participated in the marches during the daytime, returning home in the evenings, "due to traditional sensitivities around spending nights on the roads".

== Points of view ==
=== Role of foreign powers ===
During the late March 2018 phase of initial protests, Qais Hashimi of the PPM described both the Afghan government and the Taliban as "puppets of foreigners". In March 2019, PPM activists, including Khyber, stated that regional and global powers, including the United States (US), Russia, Pakistan and India were opposed to the Afghan peace process, instead seeking their own benefits from the war. Mohammad Nekzad of the PPM stated that "Taliban and Afghan forces are brothers" and that high-ranked people did not have the right to create war between them.

== Methods and actions ==
PPM uses nonviolent resistance techniques such as marches in its aims of promoting peace in Afghanistan.

During 2018 and 2019, PPM activists made several more marches throughout Afghanistan, including regions controlled by the Taliban. Their original 2018 march passed through six Afghan provinces. In December 2019, PPM activists marched from Herat Province and entered Farah Province.

In January 2021, the PPM called for the government and the Taliban to accept mediation by a neutral third party in their peace negotiations.

== Independence ==
During 2018–2019, the Taliban claimed that the PPM was funded by the Afghan government. The PPM denied the claim. In 2018, Maria J. Stephan and Johnny Walsh of the United States Institute of Peace (USIP) saw the PPM as a sign of a widespread desire for peace across diverse components of Afghan society. They stated that the PPM had gained a reputation for independence from US, Afghan and Taliban military forces and from local and international political groups, as a genuine grassroots group.

== Harassment ==
The Taliban kidnapped PPM members several times. The fourth incident took place during a December 2019 march. Twenty-seven PPM activists were kidnapped by the Taliban while travelling by car on 24 or 25 December and released on 26 December.

== Analysis ==
The PPM inspired other groups for peaceful protests, including a June 2018 all-female street protest in Helmand Province that "welcomed" the Taliban with flowers and demanded that an existing ceasefire be extended.

In 2019, Nancy Lindborg and Andrew Wilder of USIP argued that PPM and other grassroots peace-related activities in Afghanistan, including peace and conflict studies courses that were implemented in several Afghan universities, could "increase much-needed pressure on [Afghan] leaders to take peace more seriously." Lindborg and Wilder quoted a civil society activist who stated, "The Taliban are afraid of the people being mobilized."

== See also ==
- Pashtun Tahafuz Movement, a mainly Pashtun peace movement based in Pakistan
