= Anti-Pakistan sentiment =

Negative irrational fixation toward Pakistan, Pakistanis and Pakistani culture

Anti-Pakistan sentiment (also called Pakophobia or Pakistanophobia) refers to hatred, fear, hostility or irrational fixation toward Pakistan, Pakistanis and Pakistani culture and may manifest as racism, discrimination, or violence against Pakistanis on the basis of their national origin. In a political context, it usually refers to a pronounced dislike of Pakistan's actions or existence as a sovereign state. Additionally, hostility toward Pakistanis may also be motivated by other types of xenophobic sentiment, such as Islamophobia or broad racism targeting South Asian people as a whole.

Negative attitudes towards Pakistan have existed since the beginning of the Pakistan Movement, which advocated the establishment of a separate state for Muslims in parts of erstwhile British India. The idea of Pakistan, as put forth by the All-India Muslim League, was denounced by much of the Indian independence movement, in which many activists opposed partitioning India. The creation of Pakistan occurred through the partition of India in August 1947, resulting in widespread communal violence between Muslims and non-Muslims that displaced 20 million people along religious lines, which laid the foundation for the ongoing India–Pakistan conflict. Beyond India, regional anti-Pakistan sentiment has existed in Afghanistan and Bangladesh, where it is primarily rooted in the Durand Line dispute since 1949 and the Bangladesh genocide in 1971, respectively.

== India ==
Results of 2017 BBC World Service poll. Views of Pakistan's influence by country Sorted by Pos-Neg
Country polled	Positive	Negative	Neutral	Pos-Neg
India	5%	85%	10%	-80
Brazil	5%	81%	14%	-76
United States	14%	71%	15%	-57
France	16%	72%	12%	-56
Mexico	10%	65%	25%	-55
Spain	5%	59%	36%	-54
Greece	4%	58%	38%	-54
Canada	14%	67%	19%	-53
Peru	9%	59%	32%	-50
Germany	1%	47%	52%	-46
Australia	18%	63%	19%	-45
Nigeria	19%	62%	19%	-43
United Kingdom	28%	62%	10%	-34
Russia	10%	40%	50%	-30
Turkey	29%	48%	33%	-19
Kenya	36%	35%	29%	+1
China	47%	44%	9%	+3
Indonesia	38%	22%	40%	+16

=== Ideological ===
Indian nationalists led by Mahatma Gandhi and Jawaharlal Nehru wanted to make what was then British-ruled India, as well as the 562 princely states under British paramountcy, into a single secular, democratic state. The All India Azad Muslim Conference, which represented nationalist Muslims, gathered in Delhi in April 1940 to voice its support for an independent and united India. The colonial authorities, however, sidelined this nationalist Muslim organization and came to see Jinnah, who advocated separatism, as the sole representative of Indian Muslims. This was viewed with dismay by many Indian nationalists, who viewed Jinnah's ideology as damaging and unnecessarily divisive.

==== Congress and secular critiques ====
In an interview with Leonard Mosley, Nehru said that he and his fellow Congressmen were "tired" after the independence movement, so weren't ready to further drag on the matter for years with Jinnah's Muslim League, and that, anyway, they "expected that partition would be temporary, that Pakistan would come back to us." Gandhi also thought that the Partition would be undone. The All India Congress Committee, in a resolution adopted on 14 June 1947, openly stated that "geography and the mountains and the seas fashioned India as she is, and no human agency can change that shape or come in the way of its final destiny… at when present passions have subsided, India's problems will be viewed in their proper perspective and the false doctrine of two nations will be discredited and discarded by all."

V.P. Menon, who had an important role in the transfer of power in 1947, quotes another major Congress politician, Abul Kalam Azad, who said that "the division is only of the map of the country and not in the hearts of the people, and I am sure it is going to be a short-lived partition." Acharya Kripalani, President of the Congress Party during the days of Partition, stated that making India "a strong, happy, democratic and socialist state" would ensure that "such an India can win back the seceding children to its lap... for the freedom we have achieved cannot be complete without the unity of India." Yet another leader of the Congress, Sarojini Naidu, said that she did not consider India's flag to be India's because "India is divided" and that "this is merely a temporary geographical separation. There is no spirit of separation in the heart of India."

Giving a more general assessment, Paul Brass says that "many speakers in the Constituent Assembly expressed the belief that the unity of India would be ultimately restored."

==== Hindu nationalist critiques ====
Hindu nationalists in India support the idea of Akhand Bharat, 'undivided India', and consider the partition of India an illegitimate act. Already in early June 1947 the All India Committee of the Hindu Mahasabha issued a resolution, where it stated that "[t]his Committee deeply deplores that the Indian National Congress, after having given solemn assurance to the Hindu electorates that it stood by the unity of India and would oppose the disintegration of India, has betrayed the country by agreeing to the partition of India without a referendum. The Committee declares that Hindus are not bound by this commitment of Congress. It reiterates that India is one and indivisible and that there will never be peace unless and until the separated areas are brought back into the Indian Union and made integral parts thereof."

As per journalist Eric Margolis, "to Hindu nationalists, even the continued existence of Pakistan constitutes a threat to the Indian union, as well as a painful affront to their sense of national importance and a galling reminder of their hated historical enemy, the Muslim Mogul Empire." The Bharatiya Jana Sangh (BJS), a direct precedent of the Bharatiya Janata Party (BJP), the current ruling party which came out of its split, during the 50s and 60s, considered "the ultimate aim of Indian foreign policy in the region to be the reassimilation of Pakistan into an undivided India ('Bharath')." During the demolition of the Babri Masjid, Hindu nationalist elements who participated to its destruction were heard with the slogan "Babur ki santan, jao Pakistan ya Qabristan! (Descendants of Babur, go to Pakistan or the graveyard!)", thus considering Pakistan, as a modern-State, a continuation of what they consider to be Islamic imperialism in the region.

M. S. Golwalkar, who was the leader of the Rashtriya Swayamsevak Sangh (RSS) and thus one of the most important Hindu nationalist voices, also saw Pakistan as continuing "Islamic aggression" against Hindus: "The naked fact remains that an aggressive Muslim State has been carved out of our own motherland. From the day the so-called Pakistan came into being, we in Sangh have been declaring that it is a clear case of continued Muslim aggression (...) we of the Sangh have been, in fact, hammering this historical truth for the last so many years. Some time ago, the noted world historian Prof. Arnold Toynbee, came forward to confirm it. He visited our country twice, studied our national development at close quarters, and wrote an article setting forth the correct historical perspective of Partition. Therein he has unequivocally stated that the creation of Pakistan is the first successful step of the Muslims in this 20th century to realise their twelve-hundred-year-old dream of complete subjugation of this country."

On the more popular level, there have been many anti-Pakistan rallies involving the burning or desecration of Pakistani flags.

=== Sports ===
In February 2011, the Shiv Sena stated that it would not allow Pakistan to play any 2011 Cricket World Cup matches in Mumbai. Pakistan Hockey Federation also feared of sending the national hockey of Pakistan because of anti-Pakistani sentiment in India. The state of Maharashtra, where Shiv Sena is prominent, has been deemed an unsafe venue for hosting visiting Pakistani teams. Shiv Sena has periodically disrupted cricketing occasions involving the two countries. In 1999, it tampered the pitch at Feroz Shah Kotla Ground to stop a match between the two sides, while during the 2006 Champions Trophy it made threats against hosting Pakistan's matches in Jaipur and Mohali. Post-2008, it has frequently threatened against the resumption of a bilateral Indo-Pakistani cricket series. In October 2015, Shiv Sena activists barged into the headquarters of the Board of Control for Cricket in India (BCCI) in Mumbai, chanting anti-Pakistan slogans and stopping a scheduled meeting between BCCI president Shashank Manohar and the Pakistan Cricket Board's Shahryar Khan and Najam Sethi. In the 2023 Cricket World Cup, Pakistan Cricket Fans and media personnel were barred from attending the group stage match between the two nations.

As a result of the November 2008 terrorist attacks in Mumbai by Pakistan-based militant group Lashkar-e-Taiba, Pakistani players were excluded from the Indian Premier League from the second season. In addition, India refused to play with Pakistan in any bilateral series and pulled out from the 2009 series. Furthermore, in the aftermath of the Pahalgam terror attack in April 2025 and the subsequent conflict, there have been no handshakes between captains of both teams during the 2025 Asia Cup and the 2026 Men's T20 World Cup.

=== Media ===
Several major Bollywood films have depicted Pakistan in a hostile manner by portraying Pakistanis and the state as a hostile enemy. Other Bollywood movies, however, have been highly popular in Pakistan and India's Bollywood movie star. Although Bollywood films were banned for 40 years prior to 2008 because Indian culture was officially viewed as being "vulgar", there had been an active black market during the period and little was done to disrupt it.

In 2012, Raj Thackeray and his party Maharashtra Navnirman Sena (MNS) told Indian singer Asha Bhosle not to co-judge in Sur Kshetra, a musical reality show aired on a local television channel that featured Pakistani artists alongside Indians. The MNS threatened to disrupt the shoot among other consequences if the channel went on to air the show. However, amid tight security in a hotel conference, Bhosle played down the threat, saying she only understood the language of music and did not understand politics. In the past, Shiv Sena has disrupted concerts by Pakistani artists in India. In October 2015, Shiv Sena activists assaulted Indian journalist Sudheendra Kulkarni and blackened his face with ink; Kulkarni was due to host a launch event for former Pakistani foreign affairs minister Khurshid Mahmud Kasuri's book in Mumbai. The Shiv Sena have also blocked the screening or promotion of Pakistani films in Indian cinemas, or Indian films starring Pakistani actors, as well as threatening Pakistani artists in Maharashtra.

According to one Indian minister, Kiren Rijiju, much of the obsession with Pakistan is limited to North India due to historical and cultural reasons.

Following the Uri attack in 2016, due to which tensions escalated between India and Pakistan, anti-Pakistan sentiments became more pronounced; the Indian Motion Picture Producers' Association voted to ban Pakistani artists from working in Bollywood.

== Bangladesh ==
The relationship between Bangladesh and Pakistan is poor as a result of the 1971 Bangladesh genocide inflicted by the Pakistan Army during the Bangladesh liberation War. Due to political, economic, linguistic and ethnic discrimination by the Pakistani state before independence in 1971, some people in Bangladesh had anti-Pakistan sentiment. The Government of Bangladesh demands a formal apology for those atrocities from the Government of Pakistan, putting on trial former military and political leaders involved in the 1971 genocide. Pakistan has ignored the demand.

However, many other sources including Bengali/Bangladeshi sources have challenged the Bangladeshi narrative of the war, such as the alleged genocidal acts by the Pakistani armed forces including mass rape. Pakistani writers have published their own works challenging the allegations of the Bangladeshi government on the events of the 1971 war.

In 2012, Bangladesh Cricket Board (BCB) abandoned a planned cricket tour in Pakistan indefinitely amid fears over players' safety, following protests by Bangladeshis and a Facebook campaign against the visit. In response to Pakistan's National Assembly adopting a resolution to condemn the alleged war criminal Abdul Quader Mollah execution, protests were held outside the Pakistan High Commission.

A 2014 PEW opinion poll found that 50% of Bangladeshis held a favorable view of Pakistan.

== Afghanistan ==
Afghanistan–Pakistan relations have been negatively affected since Pakistan's independence from the British Raj. American scholars cite that Afghanistan was the only country to vote against Pakistan's admittance into the United Nations. They also cited Afghanistan's hostility against Pakistan since its independence from British rule.

Issues related to the Durand Line, the 1978–present war (i.e. Mujahideen, Afghan refugees, Taliban insurgency and border skirmishes), including water and the growing influence of India in Afghanistan. Most major attacks in Afghanistan are blamed on neighboring Pakistan and Iran. This makes anti-Pakistan sentiment run high in the country, particularly among the Afghan politicians. In response to Afghan support for Baloch insurgents, since the 1970s onwards, Pakistan supported rebels such as Gulbuddin Hekmatyar, Ahmad Shah Massoud, Haqqanis, Taliban, and others against the governments of Afghanistan.

In the 1990s, Pakistan's support for the Taliban movement led to strong anti-Pakistan sentiments in Afghanistan. According to Pakistan and Afghanistan expert Ahmed Rashid, "between 1994 and 1999, an estimated 80,000 to 100,000 Pakistanis trained and fought in Afghanistan" keeping the Taliban regime in power. The role of the Pakistani military during that time has been described by international observers as a "creeping invasion" of Afghanistan. UN documents also reveal the role of Arab and Pakistani support troops in Taliban massacre campaigns. In addition, Pakistan's funding and support of warlord Gulbuddin Hekmatyar, who sieged the city of Kabul with rockets for three years which killed thousands of civilians, has also played a part in anti-Pakistan sentiment.

In the course of the Taliban insurgency anti-Pakistan sentiment was again fuelled after a spate of suicide bombings by the Taliban, which in 2011 and 2012 caused 80% of the civilian casualties in Afghanistan, and which the Afghan government and many international officials claim is supported by Pakistan. Demonstrations in Afghanistan have denounced Pakistan politically for its alleged role in Taliban attacks. Afghan leaders such as Amrullah Saleh or Ahmad Wali Massoud (a younger brother of Ahmad Shah Massoud) have said, that their criticism is directed at the politics of the Pakistani military and not at Pakistan as a country. Both reiterated the distinction by saying that the Pakistani people had been very generous in providing shelter to Afghan refugees but that it was the policy of the Pakistani military which had caused so much suffering to the Afghan people.

Anti-Pakistan sentiment has increased in Afghanistan after hundreds of suicide bombings and assassinations. In 2017 there were large protests in parts of Afghan provinces, alleging that Pakistan was sponsoring unrest in the country.

== France ==
After the July 2005 bombings in London, there were waves of "Pakistanophobia" in France. A Pakistani community leader said a "right-wing newspaper, for instance, launched a ferocious campaign against Pakistanis in France and placed them in one basket, calling them a 'cause for concern.'"

== Israel ==
There has been some anti-Pakistani sentiment in Israel because of its involvement in anti-Israeli campaigns. During the 1965 Indo-Pakistani war, Israel played a major role in convincing the United States not to send weapons to Pakistan, indirectly leading it to impose an embargo on Pakistan. The anniversary of the Indo-Pakistani war of 1971 is regularly marked in Israel with tributes paid to the Indian Armed Forces.

Israeli journalists have also criticized Pakistan's nuclear weapons program.

== United Kingdom ==
As of 2005, the United Kingdom had the largest overseas Pakistani community, who are known as British Pakistanis. There have been periodic ethnic tensions faced by the Pakistani community. The ethnic slur "Paki" was commonly used to refer to Pakistanis. However, the term has also been used for non-Pakistani South Asians. The word is being reclaimed by younger British Pakistanis, who use it themselves although this remains controversial.

British Pakistanis were eight times more likely to be victims of a racially motivated attack than white people in 1996. The chances of a Pakistani being racially attacked in a year is more than 4% – the highest rate in the country, along with British Bangladeshis – though this has come down from 8% a year in 1996. According to a 2016 YouGov survey, around 20% of respondents were against admitting immigrants from Pakistan and four other countries – Turkey, Egypt, Romania and Nigeria.

=== "Paki-bashing" ===
Starting in the late 1960s, and peaking in the 1970s and 1980s, violent gangs opposed to immigration took part in frequent attacks known as "Paki-bashing", which targeted and assaulted Pakistanis and other British South Asians. "Paki-bashing" was unleashed after Enoch Powell's inflammatory Rivers of Blood speech in 1968, and peaked during the 1970s–1980s, with the attacks mainly linked to far-right fascist, racist and anti-immigrant movements, including the white power skinheads, the National Front, and the British National Party (BNP).

These attacks were usually referred to as either "Paki-bashing" or "skinhead terror", with the attackers usually called "Paki-bashers" or "skinheads". "Paki-bashing" was also fueled by the media's anti-immigrant and anti-Pakistani rhetoric at the time, and by systemic failures of state authorities, which included under-reporting racist attacks, the criminal justice system not taking racist attacks seriously, constant racial harassment by police, and sometimes police involvement in racist violence.

== United States ==
Public opinion polling shows that the United States has one of the most anti-Pakistan sentiment of any country with 69% expressing a negative view in a 2014 BBC poll.

Since the September 11, 2001 attacks, Pakistani Americans have been targeted more often in hate crime attacks. Pakistani Americans are subjected to greater scrutiny in airport security checks. Up to 45,000 of the estimated 100,000-strong Pakistani community in New York were deported or left voluntarily following the attacks. Following these attacks, a few Pakistanis have identified themselves as "Indians" (Note: A significant minority of people in Pakistan are Muslims who immigrated from mostly present-day India and other parts of the subcontinent. They are known as the Muhajirs and commonly self-identity with modern India instead. Fewer of them are even Christians.) to avoid discrimination and obtain jobs.

In 2006, Hasan, a Princeton University graduate, was arrested by officials of the Immigration and Customs Enforcement (ICE). They allegedly tortured him, accusing him of having ties to Al Qaeda before deporting him to Pakistan. In 2009, his wife requested the U.S. Embassy in Islamabad review his case in 2009.

== See also ==
- 2021 anti-Pakistan protests
- 2024 Bishkek riots
