= Tajuden Soroush =

- Occupation: Journalist
- Employer: Iran International

Tajuden Soroush is an Afghan journalist who has been a producer for Afghanistan National Television and a journalist for BBC News. He was present at the May 2017 Kabul bombing in which another BBC employee died, and in September 2021 provided reports used by the international media on the Islamic Emirate of Afghanistan and the Panjshir conflict. As of September 2021, Soroush works for the television station Iran International.

== Education ==
Tajuden Soroush states that he graduated with a bachelor's degree in journalism at Kabul University in 2012 and a master's degree in "media, campaigning and social change" from the University of Westminster in 2019.

== Career ==
In 2014 Soroush was the producer of Open Jirga, an Afghanistan National Television program created in 2012, in which a live audience questioned a panel of prestigious guests including governmental, religious and educational authorities and human rights activists. Open Jirga had an estimated audience of 2–3 million Afghans. Soroush called for the audience to ask the "hardest possible questions" to the panel members, and to repeat the questions if "the answers were not satisfying".

In 2017 and 2018 Soroush was a reporter for BBC Afghan. He was a passenger in a car near the site of the May 2017 Kabul bombing. The driver of the car, Mohammed Nazir, also working for BBC Afghan, died from the bombing.

As of September 2021, Soroush works for the Persian television station Iran International.

== Reports ==
In September 2021 international media used reports by Soroush on the Panjshir conflict, human rights violations by the Islamic Emirate of Afghanistan and Taliban Cabinet appointments.
