= May 2017 Kabul bombing =

Car bomb explosion in the centre of Afghanistan, killing 100+ people

May 2017 Kabul attack
- Part of War in Afghanistan (2001–2021)
- May 2017 Kabul bombing (Afghanistan) May 2017 Kabul bombing (Kabul)
- Location: Wazir Akbar Khan, Kabul, Afghanistan
- Date: 31 May 2017; 9 years ago 08:25 AM (UTC+04:30)
- Attack type: Truck bomb
- Deaths: 150+
- Injuries: 413+

On 31 May 2017, a truck bomb exploded at a crowded intersection in Kabul, Afghanistan, near the German embassy at about 08:25 local time (03:55 GMT) during rush hour, killing over 150 and injuring 413, mostly civilians, and damaging several buildings in the embassy. The attack was the deadliest terror attack to take place in Kabul. The diplomatic quarter—in which the attack took place—is one of the most heavily fortified areas in the city, with three-meter-high (10 ft) blast walls, and access requiring passing through several checkpoints. The explosion created a crater about 4.5 meters (15 ft) wide and 3 meters (10 ft) deep. Afghanistan's intelligence agency NDS claimed that the blast was planned by the Haqqani Network. Although no group has claimed responsibility, the Afghan Taliban were also a suspect but they denied involvement and condemned the attack. It was the single largest attack on the city up till that point.

== Background ==
At the time of the bombing, Kabul was held by the NATO-supported Afghan government, though both the Taliban and Islamic State were able to launch destructive attacks on the capital in the preceding months. In April 2017, the Taliban announced a new offensive, saying their main focus would be foreign forces. At the time, the United States had been considering sending additional troops to Afghanistan to help stabilize the country.

== Attack ==
A vacuum truck was filled with about 1,500 kilograms (3,300 lb) of explosives and then detonated near the German embassy. The blast occurred at 08:25 local time, during rush hour, at one of the busiest areas of Kabul: near Zanbaq Square next to the German embassy. At least 90 people were killed and 400 injured. Afghan President Ashraf Ghani later updated this total, stating, "Over 150 entirely innocent Afghan sons and daughters were killed and more than three hundred were brought to hospital with burns, lacerations, and amputations." The blast was said to have done damage four kilometers (2.5 mi) away. The blast created a crater over nine meters (30 ft) deep. The majority of the victims were civilians. Casualties included Mohammed Nazir a driver for BBC News, a staff member of Tolo News, and an Afghan security guard for the German embassy. Afghan journalist Tajuden Soroush, present in the car with Mohammed Nazir, survived the event.

Injuries were reported among the Japanese and German diplomatic missions. The British, Japanese, German and French embassies all sustained damage to their buildings.

== Responsibility ==
No group immediately claimed responsibility for the attack. Both the Taliban and Islamic State had claimed responsibility for earlier Kabul bombings in 2017, although the former issued a statement denying responsibility for the attack. The National Directorate of Security (NDS) claimed that the blast was planned by the Afghan insurgent group Haqqani Network, and reiterated allegations that those elements had support and presence across the border in Pakistan. Pakistan's Foreign Ministry spokesman, Nafees Zakaria, rejected the Afghan allegations as "baseless".

== Aftermath ==
June anti-government protest

Anti-government protests broke out in response to the 31 May bombing, with protesters continuing their ongoing complaints about the lack of security provided by government forces in dealing with insurgents and terrorist attacks. They demanded removal of President Ashraf Ghani's government and pushed for formation of an interim administration, at least partly for its failure to stop the attacks. The protesters chanted anti-American and anti-Pakistani slogans, demanded execution of militant inmates and accused the government of being too lenient in the fight against the insurgents. During the 2 June protest, some demonstrators continued moving forward after requests by police to stop several hundred meters away from the presidential palace, witnesses said. Security forces opened fire and used water cannons and tear gas to disperse the crowd. At least five demonstrators died and another 15 were wounded; the son of deputy head of Senate Salim Ezadyar was one of those killed.

Funeral bombing

On 3 June, following the death of deputy head of Senate Salim Ezadyar's son at the Kabul anti-government protest the previous day, his funeral took place. This funeral proceeded as scheduled despite authorities warning that militants could target any gathering as they had done the year before. During the funeral, three consecutive explosions took place, killing at least 18 Afghans and wounding dozens more. No immediate claim of responsibility for the attack was made.

Tent sit-ins

Starting on 2 June and continuing for several weeks, individuals and a variety of civil society groups started sit-ins in tents in central Kabul, protesting against the violence and calling for investigations and prosecutions of police responsible for the killings of protestors and for the dismissal of those with command responsibility. The new protest coalition took on the name Uprising for Change.

== See also ==
- List of mass car bombings
- March 2017 Kabul attack
- List of terrorist attacks in Kabul
