= Energy Supply Improvement Investment Program (Afghanistan) =

Proposed electric power transmission link between Central Asia and Afghanistan

The Energy Supply Improvement Investment Program is a proposed electric power transmission link intended to supply Afghanistan with power from other Central Asian countries as well as interconnecting the ten separate power grids within Afghanistan. It is unofficially known as TUTAP, which stands for the names of the countries involved: Turkmenistan, Uzbekistan, Tajikistan, Afghanistan and Pakistan. The project was approved by the Asian Development Bank on 15 December 2015.

A decision to reroute the project through Salang Pass, rather than Bamyan Province, led to a protest by Hazara people, organising as the Enlightenment Movement, who felt that this decision would continue the long-term discrimination against Hazaras. On 23 July 2016, this protest was bombed, killing at least 80 people and injuring 260.
