= Paki =

Ethnic slur directed at Pakistanis and other South Asians

"Paki" is an ethnic slur that originated in the United Kingdom and is directed at Pakistanis; and often at other South Asians, such as Indians and Bangladeshis. It is sometimes used as a religious slur directed at Muslims or people perceived as Muslims (including Hindus and Sikhs) of any ethnic or religious background. More recently, references to "Paki" have been increasingly replaced by the euphemism of the "P-word". Due to reappropriation, the word has started being used by some young British Pakistanis in a non-pejorative sense as a slang term referring to another Pakistani or person of South Asian descent.

== Etymology ==
"Paki" is part of the exonym Pakistan. It is derived from the term Pak (Persian, Punjabi and Urdu: پاک, romanized: Pāk, lit. 'pure'). There was no "Pak" or "Paki" ethnic group before the state was created. The name Pakistan (initially as "Pakstan") was coined by the Cambridge University law student and Muslim nationalist from the then British Raj, Choudhry Rahmat Ali, and was published on 28 January 1933 in the pamphlet Now or Never, eventually becoming the name adopted by the new country after the 1947 partition of India and independence from the British Raj.

== History ==
=== United Kingdom ===
The term "Paki" is first recorded in English in 1964 as a British slang abbreviation of "Pakistani", with its emergence coinciding with a period of increased migration from the Indian subcontinent to Britain.

The term was very much in mixed usage; it was often used as a slur. While it might seem likely that it would only be directed towards Pakistanis, it has also been directed at people of other South Asian backgrounds (mainly Indians and Bangladeshis) as well as people from other demographics who physically resemble South Asians.

==== "Paki-bashing" ====
Starting in the late-1960s, and peaking in the 1970s and 1980s, violent gangs opposed to immigration took part in attacks known as "Paki-bashing", which targeted and assaulted South Asians and businesses owned by them, and occasionally other ethnic minorities. "Paki-bashing" became more common after Enoch Powell's Rivers of Blood speech in 1968; polls at the time showed that Powell's anti-immigrant rhetoric held support amongst the majority of the white populace at the time.

"Paki-bashing" peaked during the 1970s–1980s, with the attackers often being supporters of far-right fascist, racist and anti-immigrant movements, including the white power skinheads, the National Front, and the British National Party. These attacks were usually referred to as either "Paki-bashing" or "skinhead terror", with the attackers usually called "Paki-bashers" or "skinheads". "Paki-bashing" was partly fuelled by the media's anti-immigrant and anti-Pakistani rhetoric at the time, and by systemic failures of state authorities, which included under-reporting racist attacks, the criminal justice system not taking racist violence seriously, constant racial harassment by police, and police involvement in racist violence. Asians were frequently stereotyped as "weak" and "passive" in the 1960s and 1970s, with Pakistanis viewed as "passive objects" and "unwilling to fight back", making them seen as easy targets by "Paki-bashers". The Joint Campaign Against Racism committee reported that there had been more than 20,000 racist attacks on British people of colour, including Britons of South Asian origin, during 1985.

Drawing inspiration from the African-American civil rights movement, the Black Power movement, and the anti-apartheid movement, young British Asian activists began a number of anti-racist youth movements against "Paki-bashing", including the Bradford Youth Movement in 1977, the Bangladeshi Youth Movement following the murder of Altab Ali in 1978, and the Newham Youth Movement following the murder of Akhtar Ali Baig in 1980.

The earliest groups to resist "Paki-bashing" date back to 1968–1970, with two distinct movements that emerged: the integrationist approach began by the Pakistani Welfare Association and National Federation of Pakistani Associations attempted to establish positive race relations while maintaining law and order, which was contrasted by the autonomous approach began by the Pakistani Progressive Party and the Pakistani Workers' Union which engaged in vigilantism as self-defence against racially motivated violence and police harassment in conjunction with the Black Power movement (often working with the British Black Panthers and Communist Workers League of Britain) while also seeking to replace the "weak" and "passive" stereotypes of Pakistanis and Asians. Divisions arose between the integrationist and autonomous movements by 1970, with integrationist leader Raja Mahmudabad criticising the vigilantism of the latter as "alien to the spirit and practice of Islam" whereas PPP/PWU leader Abdul Hye stated they "have no intention of fighting or killing anyone, but if it comes to us, we will hit back." It was not until the 1980s and 1990s that academics began to take racially motivated violence into serious focus, partly as a result of black and Asian people entering academic life.

==== Reclamation ====
In the twenty-first century, some younger British Pakistanis and other British South Asians have attempted to reclaim the word, thus drawing parallels to the LGBT reclamation of the slur "queer" and the African American reclamation of the slur "nigger". Peterborough businessman Abdul Rahim, who produces merchandise reclaiming the word, equates it to more socially accepted terms such as "Aussie" and "Kiwi", saying that it is more similar to them than it is to "nigger", as it denotes a nationality and not a biological race. However, other British Pakistanis see use of the word as unacceptable even among members of their community, due to its historical usage in a negative way.

==== Research ====
In December 2000, the Advertising Standards Authority published research on attitudes of the British public to pejoratives. It ranked "Paki" as the tenth severest pejorative in the English language, up from seventeenth three years earlier.

Several scholars have compared Islamophobic street violence in the 2000s and 2010s to that of Paki-bashing in the 1970s and 1980s. Robert Lambert said that a key difference is that, whereas the National Front and BNP targeted all British South Asians (including Muslims and Sikhs), the English Defence League (EDL) specifically target British Muslims. Lambert also compared the media's role in fuelling "Paki-bashing" in the late 20th century to its role in fuelling Islamophobic sentiment in the early 21st century. Geddes said that variations of the "Paki" racial slur were occasionally used by members of the EDL.

=== Canada ===
The term is also used as a slur in Canada against South Asian Canadians. The term migrated to Canada around the 1970s with increased South Asian immigration to Canada. In 2008, a campaign sign for an Indo-Canadian Alberta Liberal Party candidate in Edmonton was defaced when the slur was spray painted on it.

== Notable uses ==
Americans are generally unfamiliar with the term "Paki" as a slur, and US leaders and public figures have occasionally had to apologise for using the term. In January 2002, US President George W. Bush said on India–Pakistan relations that "We are working hard to convince both the Indians and the Pakis that there's a way to deal with their problems without going to war." After a Pakistani-American journalist complained, a White House spokesman made a statement that Bush had great respect for Pakistan. This followed an incident four years earlier, when Clinton White House adviser Sandy Berger had to apologise for referencing "Pakis" in public comments.

Spike Milligan, who was white, but born and raised in India, played the lead role of Kevin O'Grady in the 1969 LWT sitcom Curry and Chips. O'Grady, half-Irish and half-Pakistani, was taunted with the name "Paki-Paddy"; the show intended to mock racism and bigotry. Following complaints, the BBC edited out use of the word in repeats of the 1980s sitcom Only Fools and Horses. Columnists have perceived this as a way of obscuring the historical truth that the use of such words was commonplace at the time. It was also regularly used in EastEnders in the 1980s referring to the owners of a local food shop including the first episode, which in contrast was not edited out in repeats. The word was also used in the film Rita, Sue and Bob Too – set in Bradford, one of the first cities to have a large Pakistani community.

In the 2018 biopic Bohemian Rhapsody, Freddie Mercury, who was a Parsi Indian, was often addressed derogatorily as a "Paki" when he worked as a baggage handler at London Heathrow Airport in 1970.

In 2009, Prince Harry was publicly admonished when he was caught on video (taken years before) calling one of his fellow Army recruits "our little Paki friend."

In 2015, the American film Jurassic World was mocked satirically by British Asian comedian Guz Khan for using "pachys" (pronounced "pakis") as shorthand for the genus Pachycephalosaurus.

During the 2024 UK General Election campaign, a canvasser for the Reform party used the slur against then prime minister Rishi Sunak, which the prime minister later addressed and condemned.

== See also ==
- Coolie – Offensive term for a labourer from Asia
