= 2021 anti-Pakistan protests =

Protests of Pakistani involvement in Afghanistan

- Part of the Afghanistan conflict and anti-Pakistani sentiment
- Location: Afghanistan, Austria, Belgium, Canada, Germany, Greece, India, Iran, Pakistan, Sweden, United States, United Kingdom
- Caused by: Pakistani involvement in War in Afghanistan (2001–2021) and the Republican insurgency in Afghanistan

The 2021 anti-Pakistan protests were a series of protests against Pakistan occurring in Afghanistan, India, Iran, the United States and other countries (mostly by the Afghan diaspora) in opposition to alleged Pakistani involvement in the war in Afghanistan and the subsequent Panjshir conflict.

== Background ==
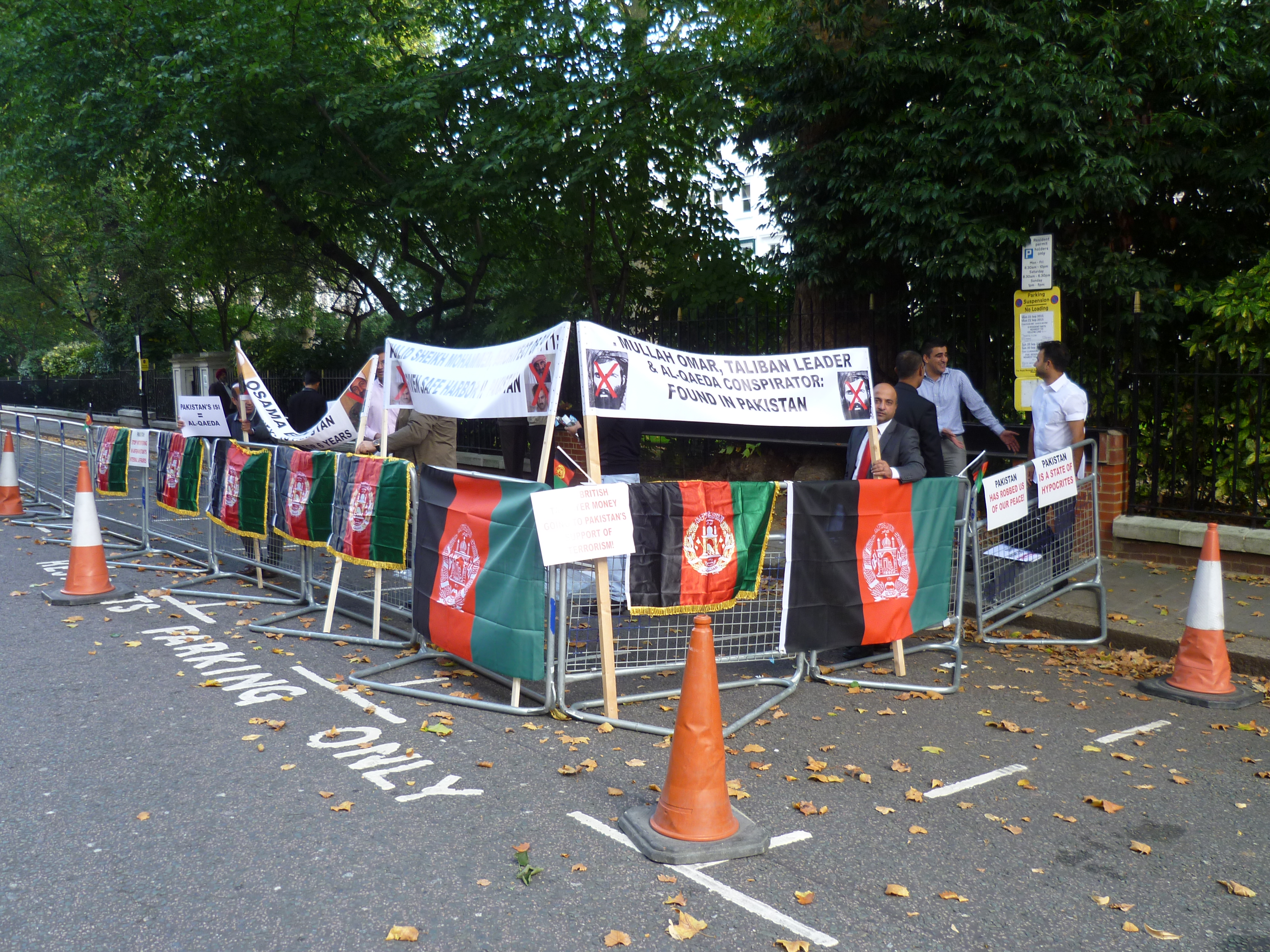
Anti Pakistani protests happened outside the Pakistani high commission in London

"#SanctionPakistan" became a social media trend from the beginning of August 2021, as Afghanistan President Ashraf Ghani accused Pakistan of actively supporting the Taliban. The result of Afghans using this anti-Pakistan hashtag led to "wider calls" on the United Nations Security Council to sanction the country for supporting the Taliban in Afghanistan. As the Taliban insurgency in 2021 grew, and the Islamic Republic of Afghanistan collapsed, protests in front of Pakistani embassies and consulates began, accompanied by calls from some western voices such as former Canadian politician Chris Alexander, to sanction Pakistan.

Ryan Clarke, a senior fellow at the East Asian Institute of Singapore stated "Pakistan has a small fraction of strategic control over an Afghan Taliban that is now a far more capable and experienced fighting force." Pakhtun activist Afrasiab Khattak said the “Taliban is in a way an instrument of Pakistan’s ‘strategic depth’ in Afghanistan. Pakistan is very happy with the Taliban advances; Pakistani generals, I mean – the civilian government has no role in shaping policy.” As the Taliban came to occupy most of Afghanistan, protests against Pakistan intensified as allegations emerged claiming that Pakistan was supporting the Taliban against the National Resistance Front of Afghanistan in the Panjshir conflict.

Pakistan denied involvement in the war, and said the Taliban's rapid advances were the fault of the Afghan National Army, which surrendered en masse without fighting.

Some western observers blamed the ineffectiveness of the corrupt Afghan National Army and government for their loss in the war, as well as the fact that many Afghan factions had agreed not to fight the Taliban.

Thomas Johnson, author of Taliban Narratives: The uses and power of stories in the Afghanistan conflict, stated “There are certain people who blame Pakistan for everything because it’s very easy. I think the situation on the ground is much more complicated than that," and "You also have to look at the Kabul government’s corruption and it’s [sic] lack of legitimacy. You have a wide variety of reasons to assess (for what’s unfolding in Afghanistan).”

Similarly, scholars Tara Vasei and Ross Garnstien in their paper The Forgotten History of Afghanistan-Pakistan Relations argue Afghanistan's ongoing aggression towards Pakistan, including interference in its internal issues for three decades going back to its independence eventually prompted the Pakistani government to leverage support to extremist groups within Afghanistan to counter the hostile government in Kabul through internal instability, like the Afghan method of doing the same within Pakistan. They argue Pakistan's concerns of constant Afghan interference inside Pakistan has long been overlooked internationally, promoting Islamabad to seek a series counter-attacks against by taking advantage of right-wing extremists there and using them proxies to counter-attack Kabul. They argue Afghanistan's refusal to accept the internationally recognized Durand Line is the crux of the problem.

== Protests ==
In July 2021, protestors protested in front of the Pakistan Embassy in Sweden and alleged Pakistan of involvement in the war in Afghanistan.

On 1 August, Afghans protested against Pakistan in front of the Pakistani Consulate in Frankfurt, Germany, over Pakistan's policy towards Afghanistan. The protestors chanted anti-Pakistani slogans.

On 2 August, hundreds of Afghans protested in Canada and France against Pakistan’s and Iran’s interferences in Afghanistan.

On 11 August, Afghan diaspora in Vienna protested against Pakistan's "proxy war" in Afghanistan and urged UN to take action against Pakistan. Similar protests were also seen in front of Pakistan's embassy in Washington D.C.

On 20 August, Afghan Americans in Denver, Colorado rallied in support of Afghans who were stuck in Afghanistan and protested to raise awareness about the humanitarian crisis in Afghanistan. Some protestors also called for sanctions against Pakistan.

On 21 August, it was reported that 194 Afghan nationals were arrested in Peshawar, Pakistan, on the charges of rioting and anti-Pakistan slogans on 19 August.

On 29 August, almost 800 people protested in front of the Greek Parliament in Athens, blaming Pakistan for the deteriorating situation in Afghanistan. Protestors shouted slogans such as "Who killed Afghanistan- Pakistan Pakistan" and "Pakistan supports terrorists". This rally later marched to the US Embassy.

On 30 August, Indian-American protestors in Houston, Texas raised anti-Pakistan slogans to protest against its support for Taliban.

On 31 August, Afghans living in Belgium protested and shouted slogans against Pakistan. The protestors comprising the Afghan diaspora also called for support from the global community.

On 7 September, protest against Pakistan took place in Parwan Province, Afghanistan. A young boy who participated in the protest was reportedly killed by Taliban.

On 7 and 8 September, hundreds of people chanted 'Death to Pakistan' in Kabul rally. Taliban fired in the air to quell these protests. Taliban also arrested the journalists who covered the protests against Pakistan. UN condemned the Taliban's crackdown on these protests and noted deaths of four protestors in these protests.

Two people were shot dead and eight were injured by Taliban in an anti-Pakistan protest in the Herat on September 7.

Protests against Pakistan's alleged involvement in the ongoing Panjshir conflict were also seen in Iran, and Washington.

Protests against Pakistan descended on the Pakistani Embassy in Tehran. The protestors shouted slogans against both the Taliban and Pakistan. Many of the protestors used pictures of Ahmad Shah Masoud and his son Ahmad Masoud, and chanted "Masoud Will Be Our Leader as Long as We Live." Protestors were holding placards that read “Pakistan, Stop Feeding Terrorism, Taliban”, “Death to Pakistan, Death to the Taliban and Death to the Enemy”.

On 8 September, Afghan students in Bengaluru, India held protest against Pakistan. Similar protests were also held on 10 September, near the building of Savitribai Phule Pune University, in Pune by Afghan students.

On 8 September, more than 100 protestors mostly of the Afghan community protested in Riverfront Park, Spokane and voiced their resistance to Pakistan.

On 10 September, Afghan nationals in New Delhi, India protested against Pakistan. Protestors accused Pakistan of sending terrorists to Afghanistan in support of the Taliban. The protestors had also planned to protest outside the Pakistani High Commission, but were not permitted by the Delhi Police.

On 11 September, more than 100 people protested on Parliament Hill, Ottawa. Hamid Simab, an Afghan-Canadian who was a political prisoner of Afghanistan in 1980s, read the statement which expressed solidarity with people in Afghanistan and denounced the support of Pakistan for the Taliban.

On 11 September, Afghan community protested in Austin, Texas. Protestors urged the U.S. government to impose sanctions on Pakistan.

On 14 September, Afghans in South Delhi protested against Pakistan's interference in Afghanistan.

On 14 September, Afghan women in Dushanbe, Tajikistan protested against Pakistan and the Taliban. They chanted the slogans such as "Pakistan, go away from Afghanistan!," "Stop killing Afghans," among others. Mohammad Zahir Aghbar met with the protestors and supported them.

On 16 September, Afghan refugees protested against Pakistan in Jantar Mantar, New Delhi.

On 22 September, the Afghan Diaspora gathered at the Broken Chair in front of the United Nations office in Geneva and protested against the Taliban and Pakistan.

On 24 September, the Citizens of Pakistan and Balochistan protested against Pakistan in Washington. The protestors were holding banners 'Taliban is Pakistan, Pakistan is Taliban' and urged QUAD leaders to sanction Pakistan.

On 25 September, protests were organized in front of the United Nations headquarters in New York by the Jeay Sindh Freedom Movement, PTM-USA, South Asia Liberty, and other Afghan and Baloch activists. Protestors blamed Pakistan for the Taliban's rule in Afghanistan and asked for sanctions against Pakistan.

On September 27, Afghan Americans in Houston protested against Pakistan's support of the Taliban.

== See also ==
- 2021–2022 Afghan protests
- Anti-Afghan sentiment
- Afghanistan-Pakistan relations
- Durand Line
- Deportation of undocumented Afghans from Pakistan
