= Kabul attack on Canadian Embassy guards =

2016 suicide bombing in the capital of Afghanistan

Kabul attack on Canadian Embassy Guards
- Part of War in Afghanistan (2015–2021)
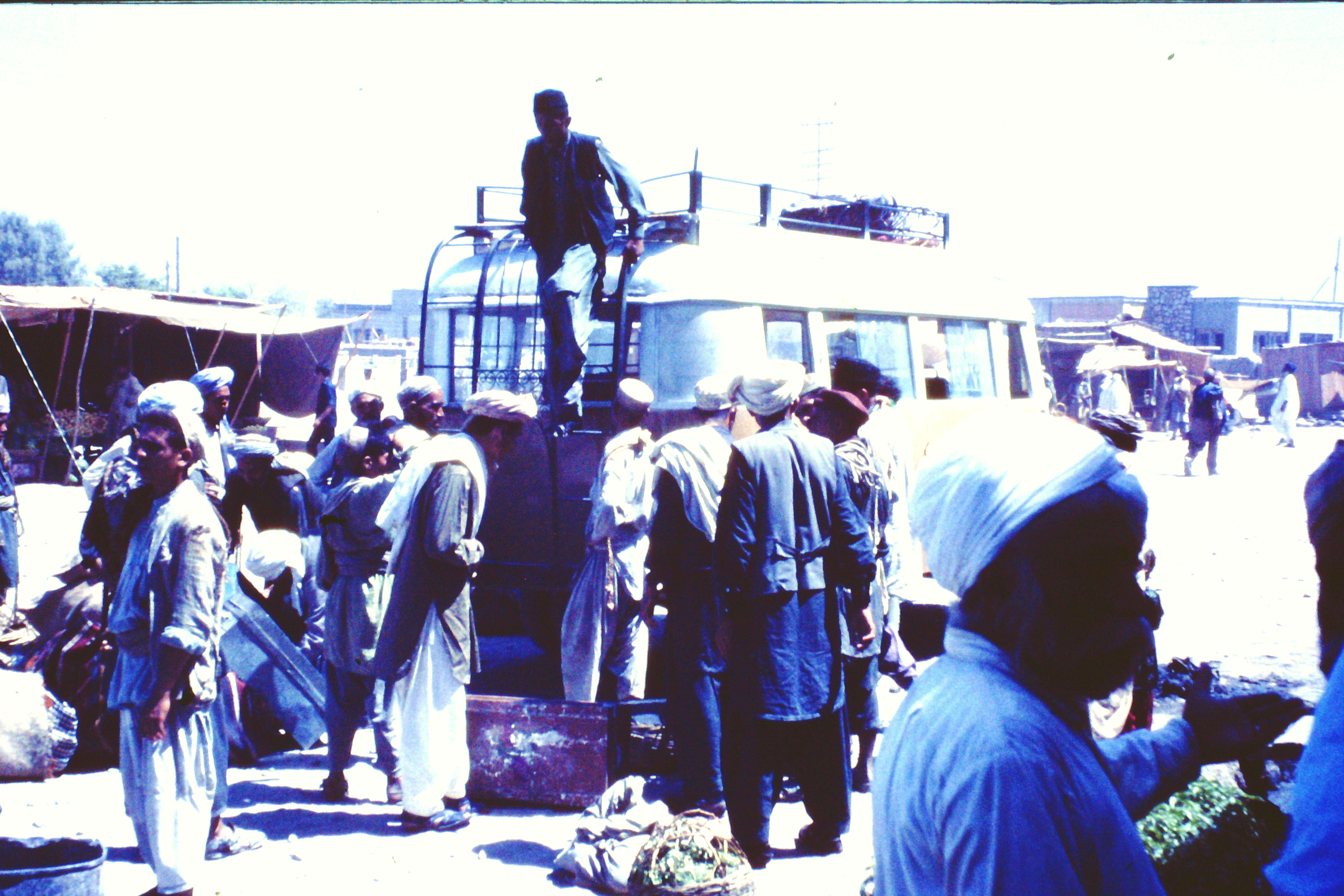
- A minibus travelling through a market in Afghanistan
- Location: Ninth police district, Benayi, Kabul, Afghanistan
- Date: June 20, 2016; Around 0600 (AFT)
- Weapon: Suicide belt
- Deaths: 15 (+1)
- Injuries: 9
- Victim: Canadian Embassy security guards
- Perpetrator: A suicide bomber of the Taliban or the Islamic State of Iraq and the Levant
- Motive: Terrorism

On June 20, 2016, at around 0600 AFT, a suicide bombing attack claimed to be conducted by the Taliban or the Islamic State in Khorasan Province (IS-KP) hit a convoy of Canadian embassy security guards en route to the embassy in Kabul. The attack took place in the ninth police district in the Benayi area, Kabul, Afghanistan. Thirteen Nepalese and two Indian contractors were killed in the attack.

The attack occurred during the holy month of Ramadan. Civilians at a nearby market were among the nine people injured in the blast, some seriously. The incident sparked debates on the presence of foreign workers in conflict-countries, with many criticising the Canadian government for negligence. There have been debates on this subject before, especially after the Nisour Square massacre, a very different situation.

== Background ==
On the same day, the Taliban carried out another bombing attack in Kabul, targeting a politician, resulting in the death of a person the wounding of five others, including the politician. On the same date, a bombing in Badakhshan killed at least 10 people and injured 40.

The bombing was another in a series of attacks on security guards and government workers conducted by the Taliban that occurred in the last couple of months before the attack. The attack also occurred during the Kunduz-Takhar highway hostage crisis.

On the same day around 1000 hours another attack occurred. A U.S. soldier SGT. Jacob Mickelberg from B-Troop 3-61 CAV, 4th Infantry Division was shot while his team was ambushed when providing security to local contractors from New Kabul Compound at PEQ, a local motor depot being fortified for the security and safety of its personal.

== Attack ==
The security guards were travelling on a mini bus that was on its way to the Canadian embassy. They were in the capital, Kabul, travelling through early-morning traffic when a suicide bomber who was inside a compound approached the minibus, which at that time was travelling through a market where several civilians were shopping. The bomber noticed the foreign vehicle and approached it on foot, after putting on a suicide belt. The suicide bomber then blew himself up with an unknown device at the minibus. The blast blew the windows out of the vehicle and left blood stains on the outside of the bus. The blast also injured many civilians who were at the market that the minibus was travelling through. Witnesses described seeing multiple people dead and injured. The injured were rescued from the mangled vehicle. Everyone actually located at the embassy were safe.

== Victims ==
Twelve Nepalese and two Indian contractors were killed during the attack. Two days after the bombing the death toll rose to 15, after a wounded Nepalese national succumbed to his injuries. Nine other people were injured, including several Afghan civilians.

== Reactions ==
- Afghanistan: Abdullah Abdullah, the Chief Executive of the Islamic Republic of Afghanistan condemned the "terrorist attack on those traveling to their work places in Kabul this morning. This attack is an act of terror & intimidation".
- Canada: Stéphane Dion, the Minister of Foreign Affairs, said that he "strongly condemns" the attack and said "On behalf of the Government of Canada, I offer my sincere condolences to the families and friends of the Nepalese and Indian security guards killed, and I wish a speedy recovery to those who have been injured". He also said "Many of the victims have been part of our embassy family for years, and they will be remembered for their service in the protection of the men and women at the Embassy of Canada to Afghanistan". The Canadian Embassy in Kabul also condemned the attack. Justin Trudeau, the Prime Minister of Canada, said that "Today's attack on security workers in Kabul is appalling & cowardly. Our thoughts are with the victims as we stand with the Afghan people".
- Nepal: Nepalese government officials expressed anger over the attack, and many blamed Canada's "negligence" for the attack. Prime Minister Khadga Prasad Oli condemned the attack and said that the Nepali government would fund the treatment of the wounded people in the attack.

== Aftermath ==
=== Claims of responsibility ===
After that attack occurred, Taliban spokesman Zabiullah Mujahid claimed that the attack was carried out by "the fighters of the Taliban" and that "over 20 people were killed or wounded in the attack". The spokesman said that the attack was retaliation for an execution a month before the attack of six Taliban prisoners. The Taliban named the bomber as "Irfanullah Ahmad". However, the Islamic State of Iraq and the Levant also claimed responsibility for the attack, naming the attacker as "Erfanullah Ahmed".

=== Nepal's reaction ===
Nepal paid a compensation of $12,000 to members of the families of the dead. Many Nepalese politicians and government officials expressed deep anger over the attack, as the majority of the victims were Nepalese citizens. They criticised Canadian diplomats of negligence for "shuttling (Nepalese guards) back and forth in one of the most dangerous cities in the world in an unprotected minibus". Many Nepalese diplomats went to Canada's capital city, Ottawa, to discuss the attack. Meetings between diplomats included a meeting between Kali Prasad Pokhrel, the Nepal Ambassador to Canada, and Nadir Patel the Canadian High Commissioner to India.

"We have conveyed Nepal's concern to the Government of Canada and sought information on under what circumstances those Nepalese security guards were attacked at a time they were ferried to and from their work at the Canadian diplomatic facilities. We also requested to ensure the safety and security of Nepalese still working with the Canadian Embassy."

— Embassy of Nepal to Canada, National Post.

A map of roads leading to the area in Kabul where the Canadian embassy is located. Also located in the area are important diplomatic offices and other foreign embassies.

Many people in Nepal, such as prominent lawmakers, expressed their viewpoint on the situation while questioning why westerners in Afghanistan are very heavily protected, but the people who guard them and are hired to guard them are not protected. Other members of the public criticised the ways that guards are transferred to and from buildings such as embassies. The incident sparked debate about how security guards should be moved. Many mentioned that it would be more reasonable to transfer guards around in armoured vehicles instead of other vehicles such as minibuses. The incident also sparked debate on the presence of Nepali migrant workers in "unsafe" destinations, such as Afghanistan. Members of the public asked foreign embassies, such as Canada's, to stop hiring Nepalese citizens and "putting them at risk".

"The Nepali guards were left unprotected. They used to be taken to work at the Canadian embassy without any security measures. It was a sheer negligence on the part of the Canadian government. Our citizens were killed in Kabul also because of the negligence on the part of the Canadian Embassy in Kabul."

— Chudamani Biswakarma, Nepal Member of Parliament, Buzz Feed.

Global Affairs Canada responded by saying that the contractors were hired from Sabre International, a private security firm. Major Isabelle Bresse, a spokeswomen in the Canadian Forces, replied by saying that only a limited number of Canadian military personnel provided security at the Canadian embassy, and it would stay that way. For security reasons, she did not mention much about the guards at the embassy. It was also mentioned that the foreign guards at the embassy were paid around $1,000 per month, or $40 a day, and many were the only wage earners for their families.

After much debating within the country, the Nepali government asked the Canadian government to ensure the safety and security of Nepali nationals who were still working with Canadian diplomatic facilities in Afghanistan, which they called "war-torn". The Ambassador of Nepal to Canada expressed concern of the "unsecure" ways that Nepalese workers are transported to the embassy, such as in a minibus without any security escort. He then asked Canadian authorities if they could "conduct a thorough investigation into the incident and share the findings". He also asked the Canadian government to provide financial support to the injured and the members of the deceased's families, saying it is their "moral responsibility".

Families of the deceased also expressed anger towards the Canadian government, as they said that they felt they had been left "high and dry". Their questions on the lack of security for the transportation of the victims across the city have not been answered. Anger was also expressed to the Canadian diplomats in Afghanistan, whose transports always contain a convoy with a large amount of security, unlike the foreign guards who are transported. Private security companies are known to hire workers from developing nations, and this has sparked much controversy. Many people also voiced that they believed that guards working at Canadian embassies should always have protection, as this is what they do at American embassies. Distressed ex-foreign workers at the embassy mentioned a rule that they can only carry weapons when inside the Canadian embassy during duty hours, making them prone to attacks outside of the embassy, where they cannot defend themselves.

Nepali workers in Afghanistan started to return home as disputes arose from the terror attack. So far, 40 people have returned, many on the same flight. They quit their jobs before flying home. Sabre International assured employees that they would facilitate the return of Nepali's workers to their home country. The private security firm was also asked to provide compensation. The Prime Minister of Nepal, believing that this would downplay the government's initiative, instead claimed that he had his government bring home the dead and injured at its own expenses, without help from the private security firm. He claimed that Nepal's government would instead fund the treatment of those injured in the attack, and some are currently being treated in India and Afghanistan. The government then sent a Nepal Airlines flight to Afghanistan to pick up the dead, injured, and other workers and transport them back to Nepal. The Prime Minister then pledged ₹1 million (which he claimed was not part of the insurance money that may later be received) to give to families of the dead.

After these Nepal contractors returned home, Nepal subsequently banned its citizens from migrating and working in Afghanistan, Iraq, Libya and Syria, said by Nepal's Labour Minister Deepak Bohara. The parliament ordered the prime minister to crack down on traffickers, who may send thousands of migrants per year to other nations experiencing major conflicts. These migrants can often be exploited.

On 8 July 2016, a monument was constructed and a memorial was held for those killed in the attack. The monument was constructed at the Canadian Embassy in Kabul, and was unveiled by Canadian Ambassador Deborah Lyons, the Indian Ambassador Manpreet Vohra, and the Gurkha Force Commander. No representative from the Nepalese government was present at the memorial. Two days after the memorial, Nepal, were many were still angry at the lack of an investigation, sent a team to investigate and assess the security of the green zones.

=== Conspiracy theories ===
A Nepali contractor returned home after the attack. He claimed that the attack took place because the Taliban asked for money from Sabre International. He believed that the Taliban warned that they would eliminate the Nepali guards in case they failed to receive the money from the private security firm. He said that "they targeted us because the company refused to give money and took their warnings very lightly".

== See also ==
- List of terrorist incidents linked to Islamic State – Khorasan Province
- List of Islamist terrorist attacks
- List of terrorist incidents, January–June 2016
- List of terrorist attacks in Kabul
