= Tabassum movement =

Grassroots activist movement in Afghanistan

The Tabassum movement (Dari: جنبش تبسم, Junbesh-e Tabasum) was a grassroots protest movement in Afghanistan that held several protests in Kabul and other Afghan cities in mid-November 2015, following the execution by an armed opposition group of nine-year-old Shukria Tabassum and six other Hazaras around 9 November 2015. The protests were ethnically diverse, had strong participation and leadership by women, and the organisational structure avoided concentration of leadership.

== Background ==
Nonviolent resistance movements in Afghanistan include Khudai Khidmatgar, which held long-term campaigns of nonviolent resistance to the British colonial government in the 1930s.

== Zabul executions and first protest ==
The trigger event for the creation of the Tabassum movement was hostage taking by a group claiming allegiance to the Islamic State in October 2015 and the execution of seven of the hostages, Hazaras, around 9 November 2015. One of the victims was Shukria Tabassum, a nine-year-old girl.

In reaction, on 11 November 2015, 2,000–20,000 protestors marched 10 km (6.2 mi) through Kabul carrying the coffins of the seven victims to the presidential palace, Arg. The marchers said that president Ashraf Ghani had failed to provide security, called for his government to resign and chanted slogans including "Death to the Taliban" and "Death to the Islamic State". Ghani appeared on television 10 hours later and negotiations were held between some of the protestors and officials on the protestors' demands for improved security measures. According to Martine van Bijlert, the protestors who negotiated with the authorities were later rejected as unrepresentative of the larger group. The protest organisers held a press conference presenting their demands on 12 November.

The 11 November protest was self-managed and calm, with human chains formed at the sides of the march to leave pavements available for non-participating pedestrians.

== Later protests ==
Several demonstrations with similar demands calling for improved security took place around Afghanistan in the days following the 11 November Kabul protest.

== Membership ==
The 11 November 2015 Kabul protest included a large component of Hazaras together with other Afghans from diverse demographic groups, with the Zabul executions being seen as "not an attack on one group but on the whole nation". Tabassum organisers, including Khadim Karimi, contacted activists of non-Hazara ethnic groups to encourage them to participate together in the protests.

=== Women's participation ===
Women were highly active in the Tabassum protests in big numbers. The 11 November Kabul march included a "large group of women [at] the front of the demonstration" and women carrying one of the coffins.

Gender researcher Nazifa Alizada saw women's participation in the Tabassum movement as deliberately being present and active in public, chanting slogans alongside male marchers, organising and leading the protests, and participating in the negotiations with Ghani that followed the 11 November march. Alizada saw women's involvement in the Tabassum movement as a causal factor for a strong leadership role in the Enlightenment Movement of protest actions that took place during 2016–2017.

Alizada objected to patriarchal language, with women protesting in Nangarhar with posters stating "Hazara and Pashtun are brothers" (Dari: هزاره و پشتون برادر, Hazara wa Pashtun baradar) and pamphlets in Kabul addressing potential participants as "brother".

== Methods ==
The Tabassum movement was a grassroots movement with "collective decision-making processes" that avoided charismatic leadership centred on powerful individuals.

== Effects ==
The Tabassum movement was seen as leading to the 2016–2017 Enlightenment Movement and the 2017 Uprising for Change.

== See also ==
- People's Peace Movement (Afghanistan)
