= Uprising for Change (Afghanistan) =

Afghan civil disobedience movement

Uprising for Change is an Afghan civil disobedience movement that started with tent sit-ins in central Kabul in June 2017 in response to the 31 May 2017 Kabul bombing, the killing of protesters by Afghan security forces on 2 June, the 3 June suicide bombings at a funeral of one of the 2 June victims, and subsequent police violence. On 11 June 2017, the commander of the Kabul Garrison, Ahmadzai, and Kabul police chief Hassan Shah Frogh were suspended from duty following the protests. In March 2018, Uprising for Change called for the Afghan government to be replaced by a six-month interim government.

== Background ==
Nonviolent resistance in Afghanistan dates back to at least Khudai Khidmatgar, which held long-term campaigns of nonviolent resistance to the British colonial government in the 1930s. In the 2010s, the Tabassum movement in November 2015 and the Enlightenment Movement, which was especially active during 2016–2017, were two new grassroots movements in which massive, multiethnic protests, with women playing significant roles, took place in Kabul and across Afghanistan in favour of Hazaras' rights, calling for improved security and criticising both the Afghan government and the Taliban.

== Creation ==
On 31 May 2017, a car bomb exploded in central Kabul near embassies and the presidential palace, killing 100 people. An anti-violence vigil started the following day, on 1 June, with the participation of 25 civil society organisations. A protest march took place on 2 June, during which six of the protesters were killed by Afghan security forces. In the evening, tents were set up in protest against the new killings.

On 3 June, some of the protesters proposed the name Uprising for Change (Dari: Rastakhez-e Taghir) as a broad name for the protests.

== Leadership and membership ==
In the early phases of the June protests, numerous groups and individuals coordinated without a centralised leadership. Two of the main groups involved included Khorasanian, a cultural association of young Tajiks aiming to remove words of Arabic and Pashto origin from Dari, and Jombesh-e Guzar (English: Transition Movement), a group involved in party politics and related to Jamiat-e Islami. Members of the Enlightenment Movement came to the tents and publicly declared opposition to the police attacks, but "avoided" public signs of participation during the days that followed. On 21 June 2017, one of the Uprising for Change leaders, Barna Salehi, stated the Uprising for Change had a 45-member central committee and several sub-committees. The groups and individuals were mostly Tajiks, while describing their aims as "all ethnicities against the government".

=== Independence ===
In June 2017, activists in Uprising for Change insisted that they were happy for Jamiat-e Islami to support them, but were independent from the party. Jamiat-e Islami also claimed that the protesters were independent "civil society groups and ordinary civilians alike". Tabish Forugh argued that Uprising for Change was not sufficiently well organised and was "vulnerable and exposed" to cooptation and manipulation by established political parties and opportunist politicians. On 3 July 2017, Asar Hakimi of Uprising for Change stated that the group is "not related to any political group or political movement".

== Actions ==
=== Protests ===
On 3 June, the day that the name Uprising for Change started circulating, three suicide bombings killed 20 of the participants at a funeral of one of the victims shot by security forces in 2 June protest, the son of a Senator. In anger at the new killings, more protesters joined and set up more protest tents, reaching a total of seven tents on 6 June, each typically occupied by "a few dozen people". Similar tents were set up in towns in Baghlan Province and Takhar Province.

Around 13 June, the Kabul protesters removed six of their tents. On the night of 19–20 June, security forces removed the remaining tent, using live fire against the protesters, killing a 23-year old protester. The Afghan Independent Human Rights Commission criticised the "continuation of violence" by the authorities. On 22 June, the Ministry of the Interior defined that police carried firearms while removing the last tent.

On 3 July 2017, Uprising for Change held a driving rally protest around Kabul, flying flags and honking horns for two hours, calling for prosecution of those responsible for ordering the use of live fire by security forces in June. The protesters also called for the head of the National Directorate of Security and the Minister of Interior Affairs to be dismissed.

=== Proposals ===
In March 2018, Uprising for Change proposed to replace the government of Afghanistan by a six-month interim administration. A member of Afghan Lawyers Union, Wahidullah Farzaye, argued that the government had been formed in violation of the constitution, so the interim government proposal appeared legitimate and possibly effective.

== Effects ==
The tent sit-ins and government roadblocks set up in response created considerable traffic blockage. Uprising for Change mitigated public frustration and took into account mediation efforts by reducing the number of tents from seven to one.

Uprising for Change demanded that officials suspected of responsibility for the killing be suspended. President Ashraf Ghani responded by organising public meetings with representatives of civil society, summarising highlights of the meetings that criticised the tent sit-ins, and refusing to suspend suspected perpetrators. A parliamentary commission was prepared, calling for investigations and prosecutions. On 11 June, before the commission was formalised, the commander of the Kabul Garrison, Ahmadzai, and Kabul police chief Hassan Shah Frogh were suspended from duty.
