= Kunduz-Takhar highway hostage crisis =

2016 Taliban attack against Afghan civilians

Kunduz–Takhar highway hostage crisis
- Part of War in Afghanistan (2001–2021)
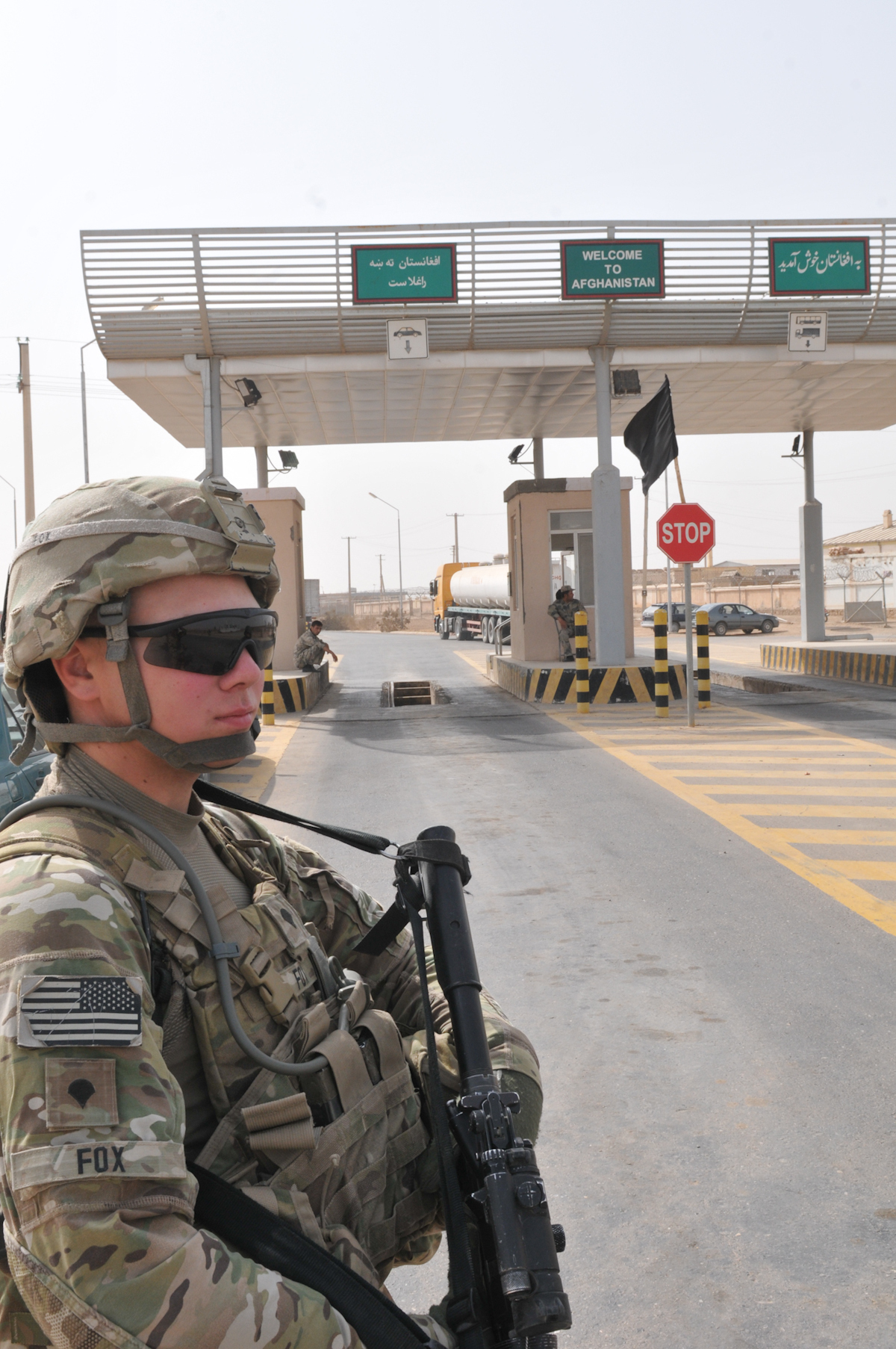
- An American soldier manning a similar highway checkpoint in Sher Khan Bandar, also near Kunduz, along the Afghanistan–Tajikistan border (3 October 2011)
- Location: Kunduz Province, Afghanistan
- Date: 31 May 2016; 10 years ago
- Target: Afghan civilians
- Attack type: Kidnapping; hostage crisis
- Deaths: 33+ (six attackers killed)
- Injuries: Unknown
- Victim: ~262 civilians
- Perpetrator: Taliban
- No. of participants: 250+ Taliban militants
- Motive: Possibly related to the ensuing Battle of Kunduz in October 2016

On 31 May 2016, the Taliban set up a fake military checkpoint along the Kunduz–Takhar Highway, near Arzaq Angor Bagh in the Kunduz Province of Afghanistan, and deployed approximately 250 militants there after disguising them as Afghan government officials. They subsequently kidnapped between 220 and 260 civilians coming through the checkpoint and held them as hostages, prompting the assembly of a rescue effort by the Afghan Armed Forces. By 8 June, at least 12 abductees were executed and more Taliban attacks followed throughout other parts of the country. A total of 33 people were killed in the ensuing hostage crisis. The exact death toll is unknown, but it is believed that most of the hostages were released or rescued.

== Events ==
The civilians were kidnapped from four buses, three vans, and three cars while travelling on the highway. Most of the passengers were eventually released, but at least seventeen were killed, and at least eighteen (some sources say "around 20") are still being held hostage. Some of the hostages were executed on the spot, and some were killed after they were transported to the village of Omarkhel in Char Dara.

A rescue mission for the eighteen or more civilians was launched. The Afghan Armed Forces rescued many of the passengers, though some soldiers were also taken hostage. Six people were killed after trying to escape when the security forces arrived.

On June 8, 2016, at least 12 hostages being held were executed, and 10 were released. Another 40 were kidnapped on the same day.

Four people were killed and two more kidnapped after another connected event in Uruzgan Province. Over 250 members of the Taliban claimed to be involved. Other groups were also possibly involved.

== Related incidents ==
Soon after the attack, four suicide bombers attacked a courthouse in Ghazni, killing at least nine people, and themselves, and injuring 13. Six days before the attack, 11 were killed on a court minibus attack, soon after the death of Mullah Akhtar Mansour. All of these attacks were conducted by the Taliban. The Taliban held Kunduz briefly one year before the attack.

== See also ==
- List of Islamist terrorist attacks
- List of terrorist incidents, January–June 2016
- List of hostage crises

== Notes ==
1.It has not been confirmed whether or not six "attackers" that were killed for running away were actually attackers or not.
