= Enlightenment Movement (Afghanistan) =

2016–2017 Hazara protest movement

- Established: 2016 (9 years ago)
- Founders: Hazaras
- Founded at: Kabul
- Types: voluntary association
- Aim: human rights

The Enlightenment Movement or Junbesh-e Roshnayi (Dari: جنبش روشنایی) is a grassroots civil disobedience movement of Hazaras created in 2016 in Afghanistan in response to the Afghan government's change in routing plans for proposed international electricity networking, which was perceived as continuing historical anti-Hazara discrimination. The group organised major protests in Afghanistan and internationally during 2016 and 2017, protesting against discrimination. The group's youthful leadership challenged traditional Hazara leaders for representativity of the community.

== Background ==
Nonviolent resistance movements in Afghanistan include Khudai Khidmatgar, which held long-term campaigns of nonviolent resistance to the British colonial government in the 1930s, and the Tabassum movement in November 2015, in which massive, multiethnic, protests with women playing significant roles took place in Kabul and across Afghanistan in protest against the execution of seven Hazaras by a group claiming association with Islamic State.

== Creation ==
In 2016, Hazaras in Afghanistan and in the Hazara diaspora, especially students and academics, started coordinating in small groups to oppose the continued persecution of Hazara people. The Central Asian Energy Supply Improvement Investment Program (commonly known as TUTAP for Turkmenistan–Uzbekistan–Tajikistan–Afghanistan–Pakistan) was initially planned to pass through Bamyan Province, where it would have benefited many Hazaras, a major component of the population. Rumours of government plans to shift the route away from Bamyan Province circulated in January 2016, and a first protest was held in Bamyan on 9 January 2016. In a non-public session on 30 April 2016, the Afghan government shifted the proposed route to Salang Pass instead, arguing that this was economically justified. Hazaras disagreed, seeing the change as ethnic discrimination that would deprive them of the chance at equalising their access to resources. Protests started in early May in Bamyan and other cities around Afghanistan. Two thousand Hazaras met in western Kabul in Mosala of Shahid Mazari and decided to coordinate under the name Enlightenment Movement.

== Leadership and membership ==
The Enlightenment Movement was led by "The People's High Council", a group of students and academics. Sayed Ziafatullah Saeedi stated that these primarily consisted of Hazara youths, as opposed to traditional Hazara leaders "from quasi-warlord backgrounds". Basir Ahang said that traditional Hazara leaders initially supported the Enlightenment Movement and its demands, but shifted towards the government's stance, thereby losing support from the young generation.

== Actions ==
=== Ultimatum ===
The first action of the Enlightenment Movement was to set a two-week ultimatum to the government to cancel its decision changing the route of TUTAP and restore the plan for the route to pass through Bamyan. The organisers stated that civil disobedience would be carried out if the government refused.

=== 16 May 2016 protest ===
On 16 May 2016, an Enlightenment Movement protest with a million participants in Kabul and parallel protests in other cities took place. Authorities placed shipping containers to prevent protestors reaching the presidential palace in Kabul. The protestors chanted slogans and stayed in Dehmazang Square for several hours. The People's High Council called for the protestors to disband peacefully, fearing violent repression by security forces.

Support protests continued internationally during the following weeks.

=== 9 June Warsaw protest ===
During the 2016 Warsaw summit of NATO, Hazaras protested, leading Afghan president Ashraf Ghani to cancel a planned press conference.

=== 23 July 2016 protest ===
On 23 July 2016, another major protest coordinated by the Enlightenment Movement started at 7am in the Dashte Barchi area of Kabul, a majority Hazara area. The protest included women with flowers at the head of the march, and overall had a "significant" participation by women protestors.

During the march, two suicide bombers blew themselves up, with initial estimates of 80 deaths and 200 wounded. The Afghan National Directorate of Security and the Taliban attributed responsibility for the attack to the Islamic State, which denied responsibility. Authorities cleaned the site of the attack, which Basir Ahang interpreted as obstructing forensic investigation of the scene.

=== Tweet campaign ===
On 28 July, a Twitter campaign with the hashtags #Enlightenment and #EnlightenmentMovement took place, generating 400,000 tweets. Tweets called for justice and support for the victims of the attack and for opposition to anti-Hazara discrimination. The Twitter account of Abdullah Abdullah, Afghan Chief Executive, was cracked with a message stating "I prefer dangerous freedom over peaceful slavery" and including the #Enlightenment and #EnlightenmentMovement hashtags.

=== April 2017 Canberra protest ===
On 3 April 2017, Enlightenment Movement protests took place in Canberra during an official state visit by Ghani, the first by an Afghan president to Australia. The protest included 1000 Afghans and supporters opposing anti-Hazara discrimination and opposing the deportation back to Afghanistan of Afghans who had been refused the right of asylum.
