= International Conference on Afghanistan, The Hague (2009) =

On March 31, 2009 an International Conference on Afghanistan (subtitled: The Afghanistan Conference 2009: A Comprehensive Strategy in a Regional Context) was held in the World Forum Convention Center in The Hague where members of the international community discussed the future of Afghanistan. The one-day conference, hosted by the Kingdom of the Netherlands, the United Nations and the government of Afghanistan, followed up on several earlier conferences.

The conference took place shortly after the conference in Moscow which was organized by the Shanghai Cooperation Organisation on March 27, 2009 with the presence of junior ministers of Iran and the United States. Shortly thereafter the summit of government leaders of NATO was held. The conference in The Hague was attended by delegations from 73 countries and chaired by the UN Secretary-General Ban Ki-moon and as co-chairs special UN emissary Kai Eide and the Afghan foreign minister Rangin Dadfar Spanta. The organisation of the event was realized within three weeks.

== Background ==
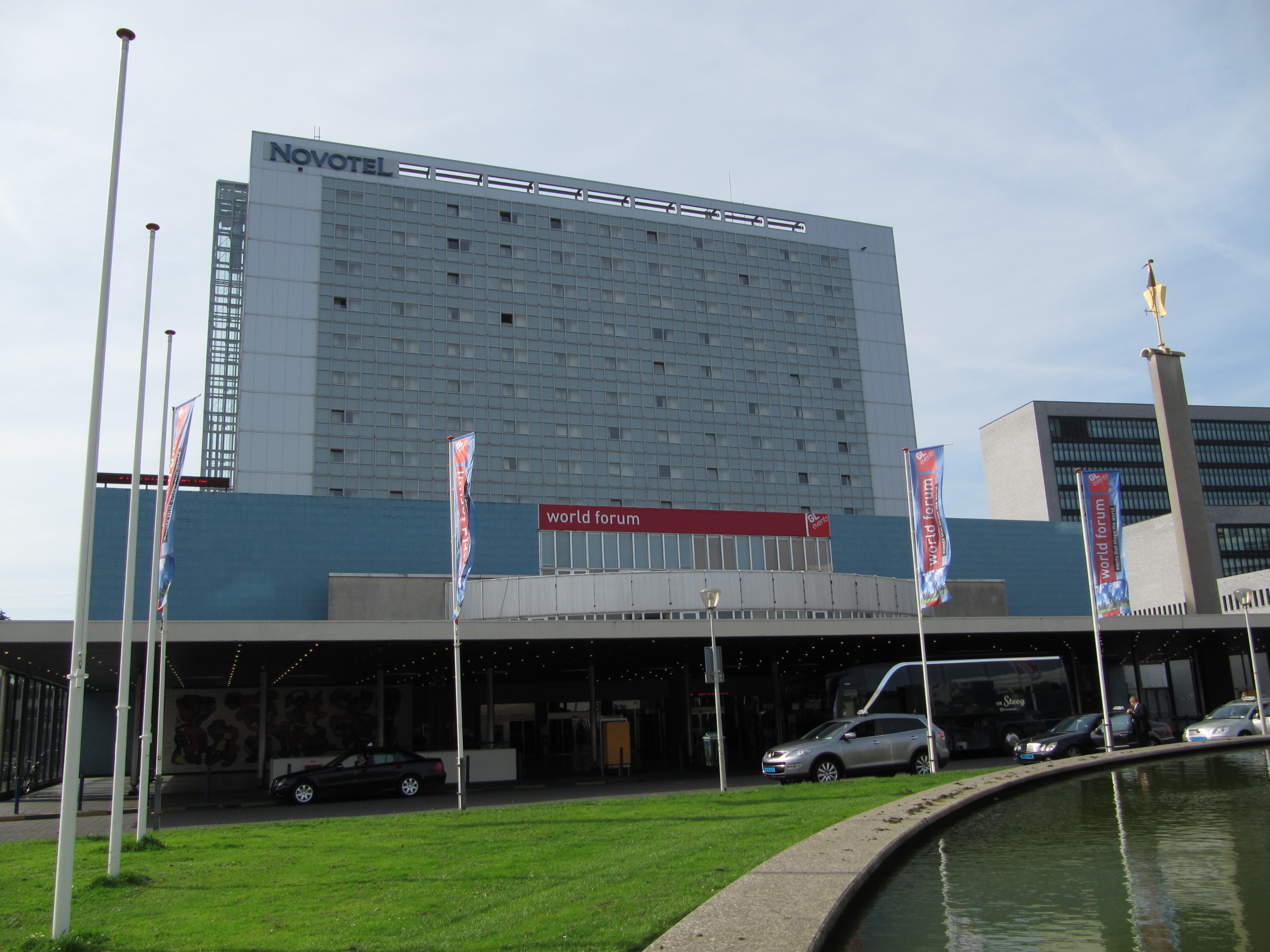
The World Forum Convention Center in The Hague, site of the conference

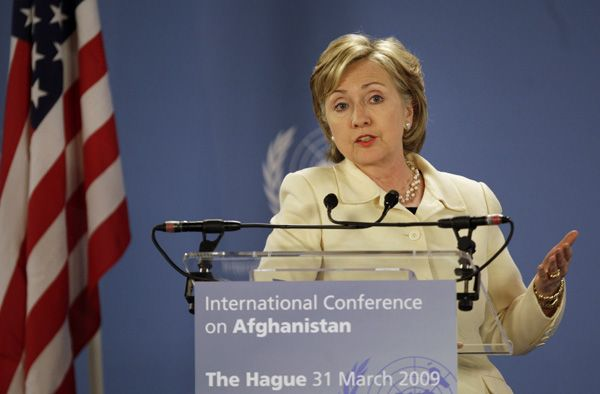
Hillary Clinton

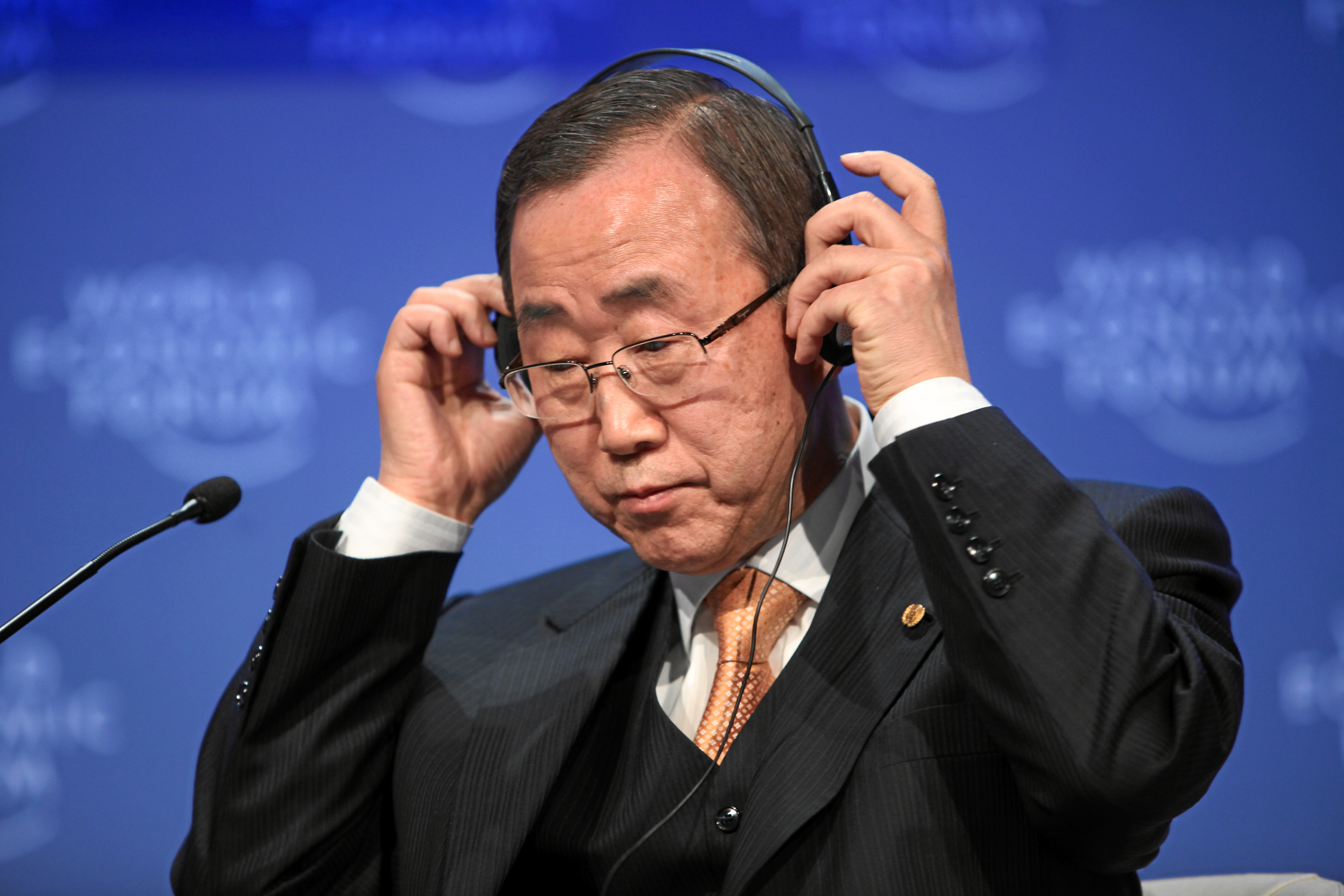
Ban Ki-moon

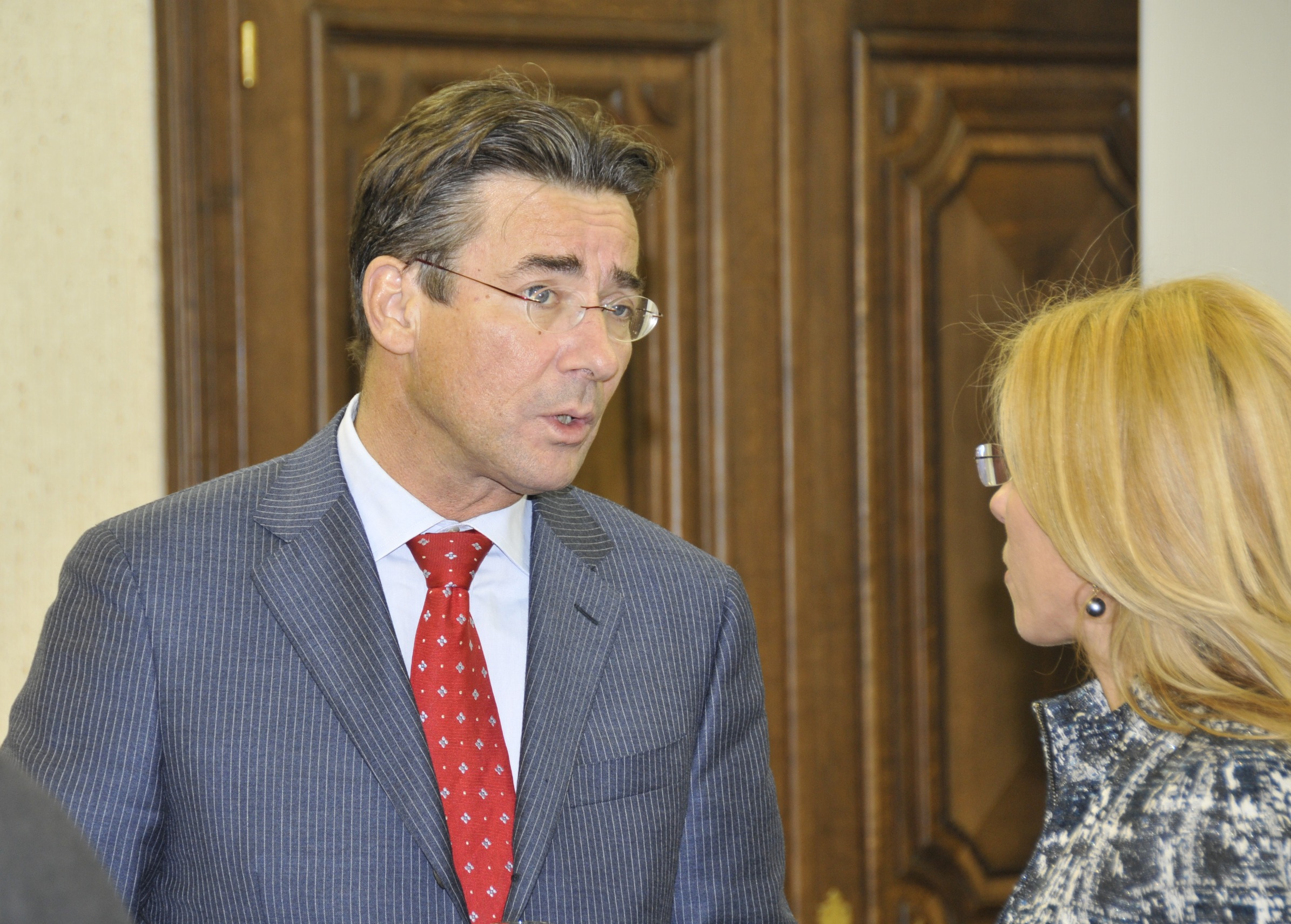
Maxime Verhagen

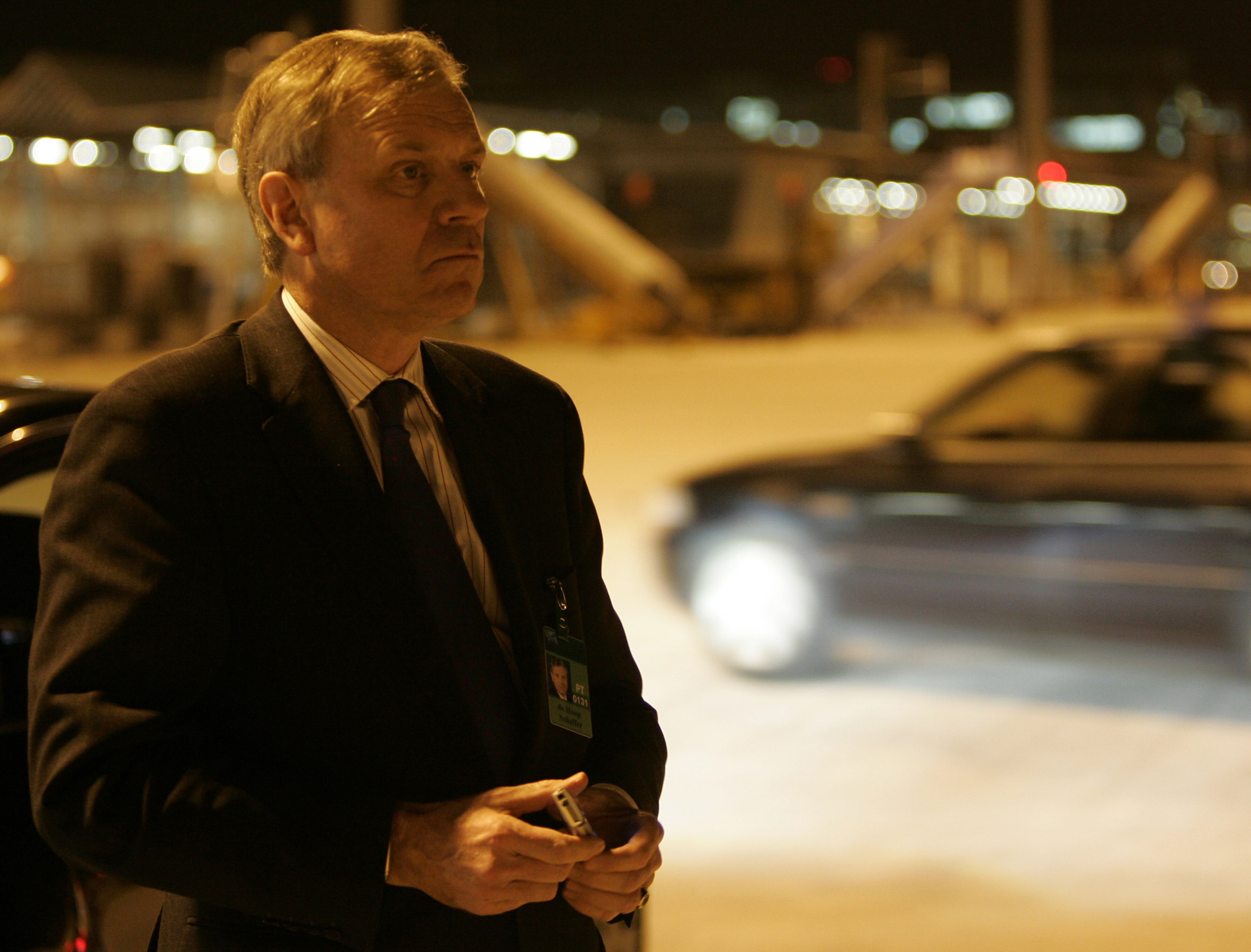
Jaap de Hoop Scheffer

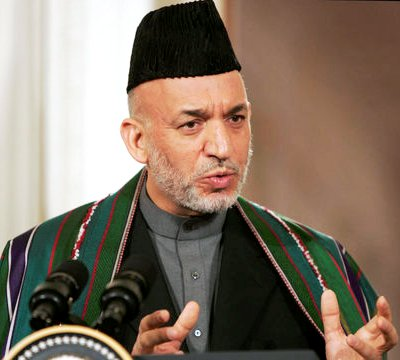
Hamid Karzai

The conference in The Hague followed a year after the NATO summit in Bucharest and little more than a year after the big donor conference for Afghanistan in Paris.

In 2010, the period in which the international community had come to agree during a conference in London to follow a mutual strategy (called the Afghanistan Compact) with the Afghan government had come to agree to follow a mutual strategy would end.

== Discussions ==
Dutch foreign minister Maxime Verhagen stated that the conference in The Hague was an opportunity to restate and intensify the engagement of the international community in Afghanistan. Therefore, all countries were invited which were involved with Afghanistan, ISAF partners, neighboring countries but also countries which were essential for logistical support of amongst others the ISAF mission. In total 73 countries of which only one (Uzbekistan) declined the invitation.

According to Verhagen the conference would look ahead to the near future in a "constructive-critical way" The discussion should focus on the fields in which the international community and the Afghan government had resulted in success and those in which success wasn't achieved and how they could be improved.

The conference also focused on the fight against international terrorism. According to U.S. Secretary of State Hillary Clinton Afghanistan and Pakistan should be seen as "a single strategic concern". The border area with Pakistan was seen as the "nerve center" of the extremists who plotted the September 11 attacks, the Madrid train bombings, the 7/7 bombings, the murder of the Benazir Bhutto and the Mumbai attacks. As a consequence of this insight the phrase "Af-Pak strategy" was used for the "theatre" on both sides of the Afghan-Pakistan border.

== Final declaration ==
In the final declaration it was pleaded that the UN would play a more active role in the development of Afghanistan, more concretely that the UN would support and aid the organization of the next elections in Afghanistan, so the trust of the Afghan people could be won and democracy could be consolidated. The attending delegates put a special emphasis on a broad as possible participation of both men and women. Also corruption should be fought intensively. Also emphasized was "promoting good governance", the acceleration of economic growth and development, improving security and the widening of regional cooperation, in which the neighbouring country of Pakistan was explicitly discussed. Minister Verhagen spoke of "Afghanisation", the transfer of security tasks to the Afghan army and police. He said: "If in a few years we see a safer Afghanistan and when the Afghans can take care of the security and development of Afghanistan, then this conference is a success."

== Results ==
The conference showed a consensus between all parties to strengthen the Afghan Army, police and other security services. This was one of the most important goals which was formulated. NATO Secretary-General Jaap de Hoop Scheffer urged the delegations to help finance a special NATO fund of 1.6 billions dollar, which would be spent on equipment, training and building an infrastructure for the Afghan army.

The growth of the police would follow after the strengthening of the armed forces. The police should grow from 76.000 partly poorly trained officers to a well-trained force of 82,000 officers.

Apart from that the country needed large-scale "civil programs" to support the government. Fighting corruption and training competent leaders and civil servants should be central.

The Afghan president Hamid Karzai acknowledged that Afghanistan suffered from corruption and poor governance and promised to change that.

Afghanistan should be helped to develop economically. Agriculture (especially alternatives for the growing of poppies), water management and energy production were seen as priorities.

The conference was seen as declaration of intent which increased the support for the new Afghanistan policies of the United States, which had announced before the conference to send 21,000 extra military personnel to Afghanistan (of which 4,000 would provide education). Almost all invited countries declared to give this initiative of the new American government a serious chance.

The conference was followed by a conference in London on January 28, 2010.

== Invited countries ==
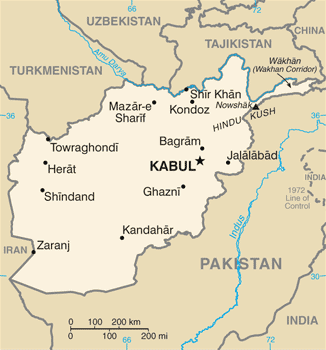
Map of Afghanistan

Afghanistan, Albania, Australia, Austria, Azerbaijan, Bahrain, Bangladesh, Belarus, Belgium, Bosnia and Herzegovina, Brazil, Brunei, Bulgaria, Canada, Chile, China, Colombia, Croatia, Cyprus, Czech Republic, Denmark, Egypt, Estonia, Finland, France, Germany, Georgia, Greece, Hungary Iceland, India, Indonesia, Ireland, Iran, Italy, Japan, Jordan, Kazakhstan, Kirghizia, Kuwait, Latvia, Libya, Lithuania, Luxembourg, Macedonia, Malaysia, Malta, Netherlands, New Zealand, Norway, Oman, Pakistan, Poland, Portugal, Qatar, Romania, Russia, Saudi Arabia, Singapore, Slovakia, Slovenia, South Korea, Spain, Tajikistan, Ukraine, Uzbekistan*, Turkey, Turkmenistan, United Arab Emirates, United Kingdom, United States, Sweden, Switzerland.

* Uzbekistan declined the invitation.

== See also ==
- List of international conferences on Afghanistan
- Politics of Afghanistan
