= International Conference on Afghanistan, London (2010) =

Aspect of Afghani history

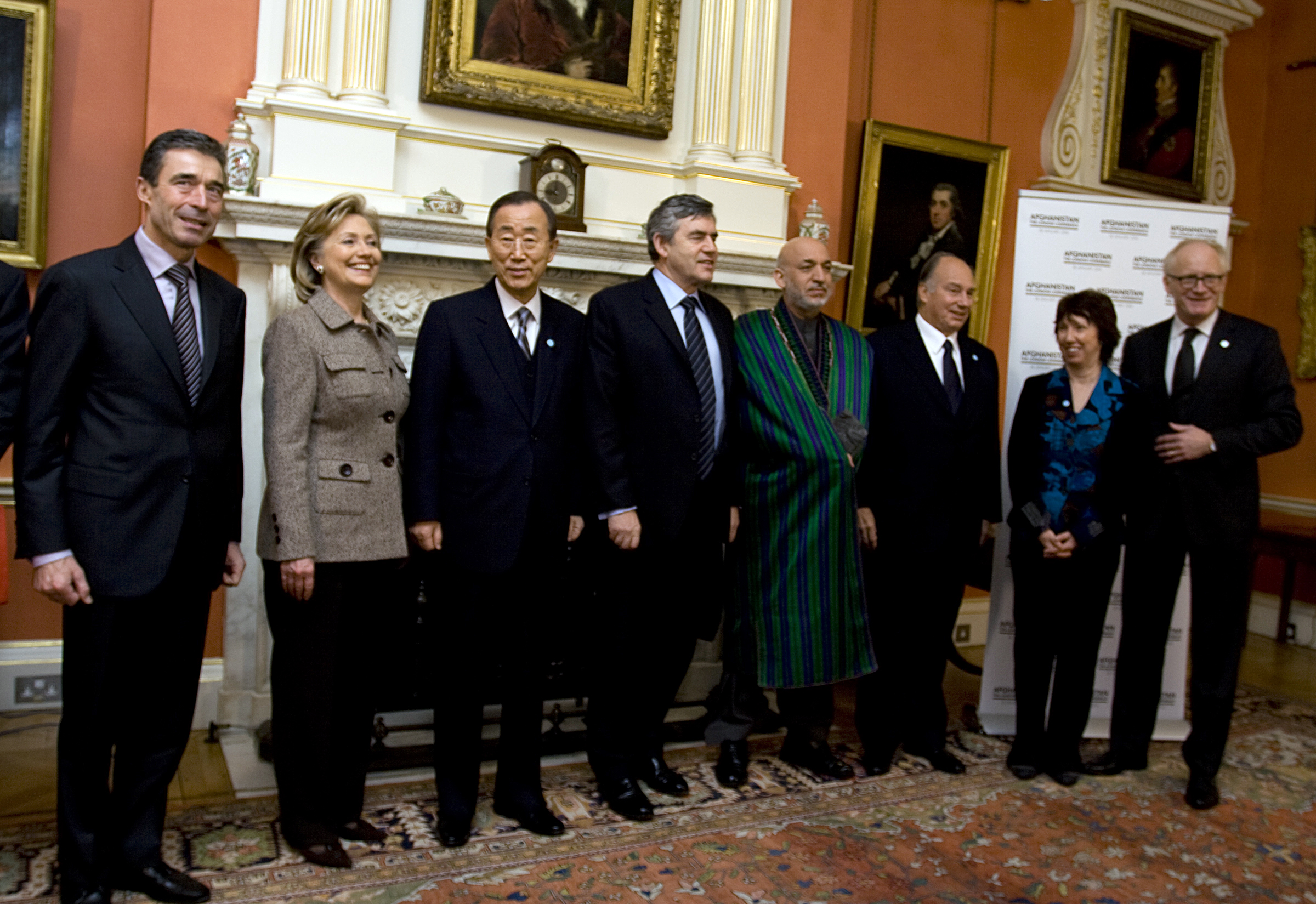
World leaders at the London Conference on Afghanistan, 28 January 2010

On 28 January 2010, an International Conference on Afghanistan was held at Lancaster House in London, where members of the international community discussed the further progress on the Petersberg agreement from 2001 on the democratization of Afghanistan after the ousting of the Taliban regime. The one-day conference, hosted by the United Kingdom, the United Nations, and the Afghan government, meant to chart a new course for the future of Afghanistan and brought together foreign ministers and senior representatives from more than 70 countries and international organizations. The conference was attended by the Afghan president Hamid Karzai, US Secretary of State Hillary Clinton, EU High Representative Catherine Ashton, President of the European Council Herman Van Rompuy, British prime minister Gordon Brown, UN Secretary-General Ban Ki-moon and NATO Secretary-General Anders Fogh Rasmussen, as seen at right. Participants also included the Afghan Minister of Foreign Affairs Rangin Dadfar Spanta, UN envoy Kai Eide and the British Foreign Secretary David Miliband, as well former Afghan minister of finance Ashraf Ghani. Afghanistan agreed to timetables to take control of certain military and police functions, and launched a program to lure Taliban insurgents back to mainstream life with financial incentives.

== Preparation ==
In early September 2009, even before the publication of the results of the 2009 Afghan presidential election, the UN Peacekeeping Department announced that it would organize an international summit in Kabul in the spring of 2010, aiming to bring the new government of Afghanistan and leaders of the international community together to discuss the further strategy for development and democracy in the near future. This announced summit would then be the first international Afghanistan conference to be held in the country itself.

Near the end of November 2009, it was decided that the conference would take place in London and not in Kabul. Additionally, a firm date for the conference was announced: 28 January 2010. The date of the conference in London was announced by the British Prime Minister together with UN Secretary-General Ban Ki-moon during a press conference at the bi-annual meeting of government leaders of the British Commonwealth in Trinidad and Tobago. The conference would be presided by the British Foreign Secretary David Miliband and supported by the UN. Ban Ki-moon would also attend the conference, as well as Afghan president Hamid Karzai and representatives of many of the 43 countries involved in the International Security Assistance Force (ISAF) in Afghanistan.

Before the conference took place, UN Secretary-General Ban Ki-moon and also the UN Security Council expressed concerns about the security threat in Afghanistan.

On 4 January 2010, Ban Ki-moon pointed to the Security Council "We are now at a critical juncture" in his report after the flawed presidential election in 2009 and the adverse effects of the increased Taliban suicide and other attacks for the Afghan government's ability to deliver basic services, as well as that of the international community to provide aid. The report cited an average of 1,244 incidents per month in the third quarter of 2009, a 65 per cent increase over 2008, with armed clashes, improvised explosive devices and stand-off attacks constituting the majority. The UN Assistance Mission in Afghanistan (UNAMA) recorded 784 conflict-related civilian casualties between August and October, up 12 per cent from the same period in 2008, with anti-government elements responsible for 78 per cent of the total, of whom 54 per cent were victims of suicide and improvised explosive device attacks. Ban noted the insurgents' intimidation of civilians in the elections, targeting community leaders and clerics in particular, as well as increased attacks against the aid community. On average nine people were assassinated per week in the third quarter, one of whom on average was a community leader.

On 6 January 2010, the Security Council discussed the situation in Afghanistan, while Ban Ki-moon stressed the need to strengthen the government's role while coordinating "broader and more effective" international civilian efforts under the UN umbrella to spur economic and social development: the conference in London would offer "an important opportunity for fresh impetus, both to the international effort as well as that of the newly established government in Kabul to provide greater stability and support to the security and developmental needs of Afghanistan". Kai Eide, the departing United Nations envoy to Afghanistan, also warned the Security Council for negative trends. An emphasis on security matters over social issues would doom international efforts to stabilize the country. Rosemary A. DiCarlo, the American envoy addressing the Security Council, noted that the United States planned to triple the number of civilians sent to help with reconstruction and economic and agricultural development; the number would grow to 1,000 experts from 320 at the present moment. Eide noted that 80 percent of the aid flowing into Afghanistan went to projects financed directly by foreign governments, thus weakening the ability of the local authorities to deliver services and speed crucial economic development. Eide and the Afghanistan ambassador Zahir Tanin talked about the need to try to reconcile with moderate elements of the Taliban.

== Goals ==
The aim was to draft plans to hand over security responsibilities from ISAF to Afghan forces and to lure Taliban members to renounce violence. The conference was held 10 months after the International Conference on Afghanistan in The Hague in 2009, where representatives of 72 countries made a commitment to further efforts in the country, pledging pledged a stronger military offensive against the Taliban insurgency, to invest in civil reconstruction, to tackle the drug trade and to stabilise neighbouring Pakistan.

During the conference, a schedule was drafted for the improvement of government in Afghanistan. A follow-up conference would then be held in Kabul with existence of Taliban's representative, to evaluate the results.

The conference laid out a plan for what was hoped to be "a new phase" in the Afghan conflict, in which the government in Kabul would take over, province by province, responsibility for security over the next five years. The Afghans would take the lead in securing the most volatile parts of the country within three years, with the first provinces probably passing to Afghan control end of 2010. Afghan forces will take control of physical security of the whole country within five years, a promise Afghan President Hamid Karzai made in his inauguration address in November. The transition would run in parallel with a two-tier peace process in which Taliban followers would be lured out of the insurgency with jobs and rural development, and Taliban leaders would be invited to peace negotiations. It is possible that NATO members sign a security agreement with Taliban that will lead NATO members efforts in the past 9 years in question and also will influence the main objectives of the war.

== Results ==
The more than 70 countries and international organisations present agreed with the government of Afghanistan:

- To develop a plan for phased transition to Afghan security lead province by province to begin, provided conditions are met, by late 2010/early 2011.
- Targets for significant increases in the Afghan Army and Police Force supported by the international community: 171,000 Afghan Army and 134,000 Afghan Police by the end of 2011, taking total security force numbers to over 300,000.
- Confirmation of a significant increase in international forces to support the training of Afghan forces. In total, the US have increased levels by 30,000 and the rest of the international community by 9,000, including the German contribution taking total force levels to around 135,000.
- Measures to tackle corruption, including the establishment of an independent Office of High Oversight and an independent Monitoring and Evaluation Mission.
- Better coordinated development assistance to be increasingly channelled through the GoA, supported by reforms to structures and budgets.
- A civilian surge to match the military surge, including new civilian leadership of the international community's programmes, with the appointment of Mark Sedwill, previously British Ambassador to Afghanistan, as NATO's Senior Civilian Representative, a new UN representative plus more civilians on the ground to support governance and economic development.
- Enhanced sub-national government to improve delivery of basic services to all Afghans.
- Support for the Afghan National Peace and Reintegration Programme, including financial support for a Peace and Reintegration Trust Fund, to offer economic alternatives to those who renounce violence, cut links to terrorism and agree to work within the democratic process.
- Support for increased regional co-operation to combat terrorism, violent extremism and the drugs trade, to increase trade and cultural exchange and to create conducive conditions for the return of Afghan refugees.
- Support more security by increasing 37,000 NATO soldiers from 36 countries of the world.
- "In the context of a comprehensive, Afghan-led approach, Conference Participants reinforced the need for an effective and enduring framework to create and consolidate a stable and secure environment in which Afghan men and women of all backgrounds and perspectives can contribute to the reconstruction of their country. In this context, Conference Participants welcomed the plans of the Government of Afghanistan to offer an honourable place in society to those willing to renounce violence, participate in the free and open society and respect the principles that are enshrined in the Afghan constitution, cut ties with Al-Qaeda and other terrorist groups, and pursue their political goals peacefully."
- "The international community welcomed the Government of Afghanistan’s commitment to implement the National Action Plan for Women of Afghanistan and to implement the Elimination of Violence Against Women Law. Conference Participants welcomed the Government of Afghanistan’s commitment to strengthen the participation of women in all Afghan governance institutions including elected and appointed bodies and the civil service."

== Military and civilian transition ==
The conference decided that in "a number of provinces" the security responsibility would be transferred from NATO to Afghan security forces, which were to be increased in strength to more than 300,000 by late 2010 or early 2011. An agreement on the criteria and mechanism to transfer the security responsibilities was left to another conference in Kabul scheduled late Spring 2010.

At the beginning of the conference, the Afghan Finance Minister Omar Zakhilwal complained that 80% of development funds for Afghanistan were disbursed without any Afghan government control. The conference agreed that, within the next two years, the Afghan government had to get control over half the total funds spent in its country. The final communique said this depended on Kabul's own progress in improving its performance, in particular in the fight against corruption.

== Reconciliation and reintegration ==
The Afghan government was to set up a "national council for peace, reconciliation and reintegration". This new institution would oversee the channelling of development funds to provide alternative livelihoods to lure insurgent fighters away from the Taliban. This programme would be financed by an international fund, to which $140m was pledged to cover the first year. At the same time, the government was to reinvigorate peace overtures to more senior Taliban members, with the help of Saudi Arabia's King Abdullah.

Karzai planned to hold a peace council, a Loya Jirga in the Spring of 2010, to which tribal elders from around the country would be invited, including those with Taliban links. Karzai pledged that peace deals would not affect basic human rights, including women's rights, which he said "shall never be compromised". At the conference, president Karzai declared: "We must reach out to all of our countrymen, especially our disenchanted brothers, who are not part of al-Qaida, or other terrorist networks, who accept the Afghan constitution." The Afghan government pledged to hold the Peace Jirga in the Spring of 2010, to which village elders from across the country, including some with Taliban ties, were to be invited. At the end of the conference, US secretary of state Hillary Clinton hinted that the US was ready to open negotiations: "The starting premise is you don't make peace with your friends. You have to be able to engage with your enemies". The same day it was revealed that Taliban commanders from the Quetta Shura early January in Dubai held secret exploratory talks with United Nations special envoy Kai Eide, to discuss peace terms. Supporters of former presidential candidate Abdullah Abdullah predicted that negotiations could fail because the Karzai government was "too weak", and other critics warned that trying to buy off insurgents created a "moral hazard" of rewarding combatants who had killed Western troops and local civilians. Taliban sources denied that there had been such a meeting and dismissed them as "baseless rumors".

== Prospectives ==
President Karzai said in a BBC interview at the occasion of the conference that even after Afghan forces would have gained control, foreign troops might be needed to continue training and equipping Afghan national troops, which could take 5 to 10 years. The international community might have to financially support the Afghan army for 10 to 15 years. And besides establish an effective connection with neighbors to minimize costs of replacement or exit strategies of forces and this will be supported by holding frequent conferences with the presence of other neighbors and active NATO members in future.

== Controversy ==
The preparations of the conference led to political disputes in Germany, about which minister would attend the conference (the Minister of Foreign Affairs Westerwelle, the Minister of Defence Guttenberg, or Chancellor Angela Merkel), and if Germany would promise the deployment of more troops.

== Iranian reaction ==
Iran, which had attended the 2009 International Afghanistan Conference in The Hague but stayed away from the conference in London, criticized the "paternalistic" decisions that were made. Foreign Ministry spokesman Ramin Mehmanparast said they would "undermine the independence and national sovereignty of nations". Iran refused to attend this conference because it was clear that there would be "behind-the-scenes scheming" and "certain countries" would make efforts to issue "an unconstructive statement" on Afghanistan's problems.

== See also ==
- List of international conferences on Afghanistan
- Politics of Afghanistan
- International Conference on Afghanistan Bonn 2001
- Bonn Agreement
- International Afghanistan Conference London 2006
- Afghan Peace Jirga 2010
