= Afghan Interim Administration =

2001–2002 administration in Afghanistan

- Provisional government of the Islamic State of Afghanistan
- Date formed: 22 December 2001
- Date dissolved: 13 June 2002

People and organisations
- Head of state: Hamid Karzai
- Head of government: Hamid Karzai
- Deputy head of government: Mohammed Fahim, Sima Samar, Muhammad Mohaqiq, Mohammad Shakir Kargar and Hedayat Amin Arsala
- No. of ministers: 30
- Total no. of members: 30

History
- Predecessor: Northern Alliance; Rabbani Council of Ministers
- Successor: Afghan Transitional Authority

The Afghan Interim Administration (AIA), also known as the Afghan Interim Authority, was the first administration of Afghanistan after the fall of the first Taliban regime and was the highest authority of the country from 22 December 2001 until 13 June 2002.

== Background ==
After the September 11 attacks, the United States launched Operation Enduring Freedom as part of its "Global War on Terrorism", to remove the Taliban regime from power in Afghanistan. Just after the commencement of the invasion of Afghanistan, the United Nations sponsored an international conference in Bonn, Germany, with Afghan anti-Taliban leaders to re-create the State of Afghanistan and form an interim government.

The Bonn Agreement established an Afghan Interim Authority which would be established upon the official transfer of power on 22 December 2001. The Interim Authority would consist of an Interim Administration, a Supreme Court of Afghanistan and a Special Independent Commission for the Convening of an Emergency Loya Jirga (Grand Council). The Emergency Loya Jirga was to be held within 6 months after the establishing of the AIA and would put in place an Afghan Transitional Authority which would replace the Afghan Interim Authority. The Afghan Interim Administration, the most important part of the Interim Authority, would be composed of a chairman, five vice chairmen and 24 other members which each head a department of the Interim Administration. Also decided was that Hamid Karzai would be the chairman of the Interim Administration.

After the 2002 loya jirga concluded, the Interim Administration was replaced by a Transitional administration.

== History ==
=== Negotiations in Bonn ===
Four delegations of anti-Taliban factions attended the Bonn Conference: the Northern Alliance or United Islamic Front; the "Cypress group," a group of exiles with ties to Iran; the "Rome group," loyal to former King Mohammad Zahir Shah, who lived in exile in Rome and did not attend the meeting; and the "Peshawar group," a group of mostly Afghan exiles based in Pakistan. At the time of the conference half of Afghanistan was in the hands of the Northern Alliance, including Kabul where Burhanuddin Rabbani had taken over the Presidential Palace and said that any talks on the future of Afghanistan should take place inside the country.

There was a lot of debate about who would lead the interim government. Rabbani did not want the Bonn Conference to decide on names for the interim government but after pressure from the United States and Russia the Northern Alliance delegation headed by younger leader Yunus Qanuni, decided to go on with the talks with or without the support of Rabbani.

At the beginning of the conference it seemed that King Zahir Shah had a lot of support, but the Northern Alliance opposed this. By the final days of the conference, it was down to two candidates: Hamid Karzai, whom the United States was promoting as a viable candidate and Abdul Satar Sirat, whose name was proposed by the Rome group. The Bonn conference agreed that Karzai would head the Interim Administration.

=== Creation of the cabinet ===
With Karzai chosen as "Chairman" of the Interim Administration, he created a 30-member cabinet. The Northern Alliance received about half of the posts in the interim cabinet, and members of the Rome group were named to eight positions. These included warlords with private militias. Among the most notable members of the interim administration were the trio Yunus Qanuni, Mohammad Fahim and Abdullah Abdullah, three of the most well-known leaders of the Northern Alliance. Afghanistan had been in a state of serious fragmentation and factionalism since the early 1990s; Karzai attempted to unify the country by working with and representing all four major ethnic groups in the cabinet. The inclusion of different warlords in the cabinet (and appointment to high provincial positions) divided opinion in Afghanistan, but many saw it as an attempt by Karzai to include everyone in a post-Taliban era of Afghanistan to prevent further conflict.

During the time in power of the administration, clashes between certain warlords did occur, notably ethnic clashes between followers of Abdul Rashid Dostum and Atta Muhammad Nur in northern Afghanistan (their rift would continue until c. 2003), and factional clashes between the militias of Pacha Khan Zadran and rivals including Taj Mohammad Wardak in Paktia and Khost provinces. Karzai's administration in Kabul did not always have power in the regions where warlords were battling.

== Composition of Afghan Interim Administration ==
Interim Ministers
Interim Administration Position	Name	Ethnicity	Notes
Chairman	Hamid Karzai	Pashtun	Independent Pashtun tribal leader in exile in Pakistan
Vice-Chair and Defense Minister	Mohammed Fahim	Tajik	Defense Minister of the United Islamic Front
Vice–Chair and Women's Affairs	Sima Samar	Hazara	Founder of the Shuhada Organization and Shuhada Clinic in Quetta, Rome Group.
Vice-Chair and Planning Minister	Muhammad Mohaqiq	Hazara	Warlord fighting against the Taliban for the People's Islamic Unity Party of Afghanistan in the United Islamic Front
Vice-Chair and Water and Energy Minister	Mohammad Shakir Kargar	Uzbek	United Islamic Front
Vice-Chair and Finance Minister	Hedayat Amin Arsala	Pashtun	Foreign Minister of the Islamic State of Afghanistan in the 90s. Rome group.
Foreign Minister	Abdullah Abdullah	Tajik	Foreign Minister of the United Islamic Front
Interior Minister	Yunus Qanuni	Tajik	Interior Minister of the United Islamic Front
Communications Minister	Abdul Rahim	Tajik	United Islamic Front
Borders Minister	Amanullah Zadran	Pashtun	Taliban leader, who defected after the American invasion, Rome Group
Refugees Minister	Enayatullah Nazari	Tajik	United Islamic Front
Small Industries Minister	Mohammad Arif Noorzai	Pashtun	United Islamic Front
Mines and Industry Minister	Mohammed Alim Razm	Uzbek	United Islamic Front
Health Minister	Suhaila Siddiq	Pashtun	Has been in the governments of king Mohammed Zahir Shah and the communist regime of the 1970s and 1980s. Independent
Commerce Minister	Sayed Mustafa Kazemi	Hazara	Spokesmen and leader of United National Front
Agriculture Minister	Sayed Hussein Anwari	Hazara	Chief military commander of the Harakat-e Islami in the United National Front
Justice Minister	Abdul Rahim Karimi	Uzbek	United Islamic Front
Information and Culture Minister	Sayed Makhdoom Raheen	Tajik	Poet and writer, Rome group
Reconstruction Minister	Mohammad Amin Farhang	Tajik	Rome Group
Haj and Mosques Minister	Mohammad Hanif Balkhi	Tajik	Independent
Urban Affairs Minister	Abdul Qadir	Pashtun	Leader in the United National Front for the Hezb-e Islami Khalis faction
Public Works Minister	Abdul Khalig Fazal	Pashtun	Rome group
Irrigation Minister	Mangal Hussain	Pashtun	Previously warlord for the Hezbi Islami Gulbuddin, Peshawar group
Martyrs and Disabled Minister	Abdullah Wardak	Pashtun	Leader in the United National Front for the Islamic Union for the Liberation of Afghanistan
Higher Education Minister	Sharif Fayez	Tajik	United Islamic Front
Civil Aviation & Tourism Minister	Abdul Rahman	Tajik	Member of United Islamic Front, but he threw his support to former king Zahir Shah and became a member of the Rome Group
Labor and Social Affairs	Mirwais Sadiq	Tajik	Son of influential warlords Ismail Khan, United Islamic Front
Transportation Minister	Sultan Hamid Sultan	Hazara	
Education Minister	Rasul Amin	Pashtun	Member of the National Islamic Front and the Rome group.
Rural Development Minister	Abdul Malik Anwar	Tajik	United Islamic Front

Preceded by Northern Alliance; Cabinet of the Islamic Emirate of Afghanistan	Afghan Interim Administration; 22 December 2001 – 13 July 2002	Succeeded by Afghan Transitional Administration
