= Ministry of Commerce and Industry (Afghanistan) =

Government ministry of Afghanistan

Ministry of Commerce and Industries
- Dari: وزارت صنعت و تجارت; Pashto: د صنعت او سوداګری وزارت
- Ministry flag

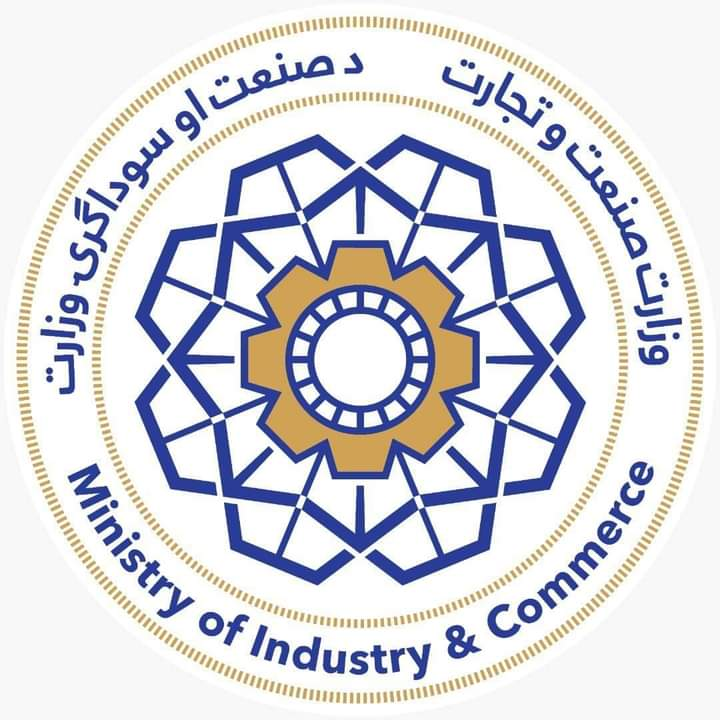
- Ministry emblem

Agency overview
- Jurisdiction: Government of Afghanistan
- Headquarters: Darul Aman Road Kabul, Afghanistan; 34.497813°N 69.142687°E
- Minister responsible: Nooruddin Azizi (acting)
- Deputy Minister responsible: Mohammad Basheer (acting) Mohammad Azim Sultanzada (acting)
- Child agency: Afghanistan National Standards Authority
- Website: https://moci.gov.af/

Current and past governments of Afghanistan have included a Minister of Commerce in the Afghan cabinet. The Ministry of Commerce and Industries (Dari: وزارت صنعت و تجارت, Pashto: د صنعت او سوداګری وزارت) creates the enabling environment for sustainable and equitable economic growth and opportunity for all Afghans by promoting private sector development in a socially responsible free market economy. The Ministry has three basic goals: to promote the establishment and implementation of a legal and regulatory framework necessary for a free market economy; to integrate Afghanistan into the regional and global economy; and to facilitate and promote the development of a dynamic, competitive private sector.

After the fall of the Taliban, the 2001 Bonn Conference formed an interim government for Afghanistan. In this Government, there was one minister for Commerce, one minister for mines and industries and one minister for small industries. In 2004, when the newly elected President Hamid Karzai formed his first official government, the post of small industries was deleted. After 2006, when there was a major cabinet reshuffle, the minister of Commerce became more and more referred to as the minister of Commerce and Industries. The formal portfolio of the minister of mines is now without that of industries, although he still is sometimes referred to as minister of Mines and Industries.

After the reelection of President Karzai he formed a second administration. in January 2010 both of the candidates that Karzai nominated for the post, first Ghulam Mohammad Eylaghi and later Zahir Waheed, were voted down by the National Assembly, Eylaghi functioned for some time as acting minister of Commerce. Only in June 2010, when Karzai nominated Dr. Anwar-Ul-Haq Ahady as the new minister of Commerce, the ministry was led again by someone who was confirmed by the National Assembly.

== Ministers ==
Afghanistan's Minister of Commerce
Portfolio	Name	Term	Appointed by	Notes
Commerce	Abdul Razak	1999-December 2001	Mullah Omar	Abdul Razak was a Guantanamo captive, who faced the allegation during his 2004 Combatant Status Review Tribunal that he had served as the Taliban's Commerce Minister.; Abdul Razak acknowledged serving as Commerce Minister, but only from 1999 to 2001.
Commerce	Fazal Mohammad		Mullah Omar	Deputy minister under Islamic Emirate of Afghanistan
Commerce	Sayed Mustafa Kazemi	December 2001 - December 2004	Bonn Conference, 2002 Loya Jirga	Served as Minister during both the Afghan Interim Administration and the Afghan Transitional Administration.
Small Industries	Aref Noozari	December 2001 - June 2002	Bonn Conference,	Served as Minister during both the Afghan Interim Administration and the Afghan Transitional Administration. After that, in the First Karzai administration, the portfolio of Small Industries was added to that of the minister of Commerce.
Small Industries	Mohammed Alim Razm	June 2002 - December 2004	2002 Loya Jirga	
Commerce	Hedaayat Ameen Arsala	December 2004- March 2006	Hamid Karzai	Was in 2006 promoted to the position of Senior Minister
Commerce and Industries	Mohammad Haidar Reza	March 2006-January 2010	Hamid Karzai	Previously served as the nation's Deputy Minister of Foreign Affairs.
Commerce and Industries	Ghulam Mohammad Eylaghi	January 2010 - June 2010	Hamid Karzai	Served only as acting minister
Commerce and Industries	Anwar ul-Haq Ahady	June 2010 – November 2013	Hamid Karzai	Previously served as the nation's Finance Minister.
Commerce and Industries	Ajmal Ahmady	6 February 2019 - 3 June 2020	Ashraf Ghani	Served as Senior Economic Adviser to the President
Commerce and Industries	Nisar Ahmad Ghoryani	31 August 2020 - 15 August 2021	Ashraf Ghani	Last commerce and industries minister of the Islamic Republic of Afghanistan.
Commerce and Industries	Nooruddin Azizi (acting)	21 September 2021 - present	Hibatullah Akhundzada	First commerce minister of the restored Islamic Emirate of Afghanistan.

=== All Ministers ===
Ministers of Commerce and Trade Minister of Industry and Commerce Ministry of Industry and Commerce

- Haji Nooruddin Azizi (20210921, 2022030, 20240313)) acting

First Deputy Minister of Commerce:

- Haji Mohammad Bashir, resident of Baghlan (202100921)

Second Deputy Minister:

- Mohammad Azim Sultanzada (20210921)

== See also ==
- List of company registers
