= International Conference on Afghanistan, Bonn (2011) =

2nd Bonn conference

On 5 December 2011, an International Conference on Afghanistan was held at the Hotel Petersberg in Bonn, Germany. The conference was hosted by Germany and chaired by Afghanistan.

At the NATO Summit in Lisbon in November 2010, Afghanistan’s President Hamid Karzai had asked Federal Chancellor Angela Merkel to host a follow-up conference ten years after the 2001 Bonn Conference. In order to prepare the second Bonn Conference, the Afghan Government worked in collaboration with the International Contact Group on Afghanistan, which consists of the Special Representatives on Afghanistan of 50 states. The Contact Group was headed by the German Special Representative Michael Steiner, and the German diplomat Holger Ziegeler was appointed conference coordinator.

The conference, which was attended by 85 states, 15 international organizations and the United Nations, focused on three main issues involving the conclusion of the Afghan War and the transition of security responsibility to the Afghan Government, scheduled to occur in 2014. These were: civil aspects of the transition process, the role of international community in Afghanistan after the handover, and long-term political stabilization of the country. The conference concluded by issuing a statement affirming continued international support for Afghanistan for the next decade. Progress was hindered by Pakistan's boycott of the conference following the 2011 NATO attack in Pakistan.

== Participants ==
Delegations from 85 states, 15 international organizations and the United Nations attended the conference. Pakistan withdrew from participation Bonn Conference due to a NATO airstrike with its territory on November 26, 2011 that resulted in the deaths of 26 Pakistani soldiers. Prior to the conference, Afghanistan had said that the purpose of conference would be hampered if Pakistan did not attend the conference and encouraged the United States to do everything it could to assure the Pakistani participation. In June 2011 there were speculations that the conference could mark formal start of Afghan peace process and that representatives of the Taliban might be invited to attend the conference. However, the Taliban said they would not be represented at the upcoming Bonn Conference; Taliban Leader Mullah Mohammad Omar said in an Eid message that the conference was symbolic and the Taliban would not participate in it. Ultimately, the speculated invitation was not extended.

== Proceedings ==
At the 66th UN General Assembly President Hamid Karzai's statement delivered by Foreign Minister Dr. Zalmai Rassoul said that the conference would also be an opportunity for Afghanistan to "share our vision for the next ten years – the vision of developing Afghanistan into a stable country, a functioning democracy, and a prospering economy". The conference focused on three main areas:

- Civil aspects of the transition process, the transfer of responsibility for security to the Afghan Government by 2014
- Long-term engagement of the international community and further international commitment to Afghanistan after the handover
- Political process that should lead to a long-term stabilization of the country, i.e. national reconciliation and the integration of former Taliban fighters

According to Miriam Safi of the Kabul-based Centre for Conflict and Peace Studies, Afghanistan's goal for the conference was to ensure donor support for Afghanistan beyond 2014. Afghanistan had originally intended the conference to serve as a showcase for diplomatic efforts at achieving Afghan-Taliban reconciliation, but negotiations broke down before the conference, and no Taliban delegate was present. Pakistan's withdrawal from the conference also hindered discussion of the Taliban issue, since Pakistan's support is considered to be vital for any Afghan-Taliban agreement.

Hamid Karzai began the conference with an opening speech in which he stressed the need for regional cooperation, international aid, and military training. Following this, discussion concentrated on the issue of international aid, with Afghanistan indicating that it would require $10 billion per year for the next ten years in order to sustain security and reconstruction efforts. US Secretary of State Hillary Clinton pledged continued US support but cited economic difficulties at home as a possible limiting factor and urged Afghanistan to reduce corruption in order avoid repelling potential foreign aid donors. Karzai promised to fight corruption by reforming Afghan institutions and the electoral process and extending the rule of law.

The conference ended by releasing a set of Conference Conclusions affirming the commitment of the international community to continued support for Afghanistan after 2014. Reactions to the document were mixed, with some ridiculing their overly vague nature, although the conference was hailed by the Tehran Times as "a very good opportunity to help create a brighter future for Afghanistan."

== See also ==
- Bonn conference 2001
- Bonn Agreement (Afghanistan)
- Politics of Afghanistan
- List of international conferences on Afghanistan
