= Abdolkarimi =

Abdolkarimi may refer to:

- Bijan Abdolkarimi, Iranian philosopher

== See also ==
- Abdolkarim, a personal name (including a list of people with the name)
- Abdul Rahim Karimi, politician of Afghanistan
