= Mohammad Hanif Balkhi =

Mohammad Hanif Balkhi was Minister of Hajj (Pilgrimage) in the Afghan Interim Authority, that was put in place by the Bonn Conference, after the fall of the Islam. Balkhi was not a member of the Northern Alliance or the Rome Group that dominated the interim administration, but was an independent shiite.
