= Afghan Constitution Commission =

The Afghan Constitution Commission (or Afghan Constitutional Commission) was established October 5, 2002, as required by the Bonn Agreement, which stipulated that a new Afghan constitution be adopted by a loya jirga. The loya jirga was required to convene within eighteen months of the establishment of Afghan Transitional Administration, which was established by the Emergency Loya Jirga in June 2002. After some delay, the proposed Afghan Constitution was presented to President Hamid Karzai on November 3, 2003. A loya jirga began December 14, 2003 (four days after schedule), in Kabul and was endorsed January 4, 2004.

== Make up of the commission ==
The initial Commission was made up of nine members and started work on October 5, 2002. After its work was completed (although no draft was released), the initial Commission was replaced on May 7, 2003 by a 35-member Reviewing Commission, referred to as the Constitution Commission. The 35 members were all appointed by president Karzai. Seven of the members were women.

The commission set up eight regional offices in Jalalabad, Herat, Kunduz, Kabul, Gardez, Kandahar, Mazar and Bamyan as well as in the Pakistani cities of Peshawar and Quetta, and in the Iranian cities of Tehran and Mashhad.

The process was being monitored by the United Nations Assistance Mission in Afghanistan and was funded by the United Nations Development Programme.

== Consultation process ==
Consultations with the Afghan public started June 10, 2003. Commission teams from Kabul and regional offices made trips through Afghanistan, Iran and Pakistan. Afghan refugees in the United States were also said to be consulted. The commission also distributed posters and leaflets, and a monthly newsletter. Radio and television announcements were also made.

== Delays and final release ==
The initial goal was for the commission to present the draft constitution by September 1, 2003, but in August commission members asked for a two-month delay to allow more time to gather reactions. On August 28 Ghulam Farooq Wardak announced that the loya jirga had been postponed until December 10. The commission wanted more time to consult with Afghans. Ghulam Farooq Wardak, the director of the commission's secretariat, said the delay would give Afghans more time to decide if they wanted a republic, a parliamentary system, or a return to a monarchy. Other issues, he said, included the degree of centralization in Kabul and the role of Islam. He said 100,000 questionnaires from all provinces of Afghanistan had been completed and sent to the commission.

The Commission presented its proposed constitution on November 3, 2003. The ceremony was attended by president Karzai, former king Mohammad Zaihr Shah, and United Nations special envoy Lakhdar Brahimi.

The draft was distributed throughout the country to Provincial Governors and Wuluswals for distribution to political leaders. It was also widely distributed via the Regional Offices of Secretariat of the Constitutional Commission to ELJ district representatives, to the media, including magazines Kellid and Morsal.

== Opposition to the proposed constitution ==
Pacha Khan Zadran, a Pashtun warlord in Paktia province, criticized the proposed constitution for abolishing the hereditary monarchy.

Mahbuba Hoquqmal, the Afghan Minister of Women's Affairs, said the constitution did not grant protection to women's property rights, did not prevent women being forced to marry without their consent, and did not offer better guarantees of equal treatment by Afghanistan's courts.

Some Uzbeks, Turkmens and Baluch said that the proposed constitution alienated their cultures. For example, the draft stated that Pashto and Dari would be the two official languages, and that the national anthem would be sung in Pashto.

Other issues raised by some loya jirga delegates included whether former king Mohammad Zahir Shah should maintain the title "father of the nation," whether Afghanistan should be a free market economy, and whether higher education should be free.
