= Nooruddin Azizi =

Afghan politician

Haji Nooruddin Azizi
- نورالله عزیزی
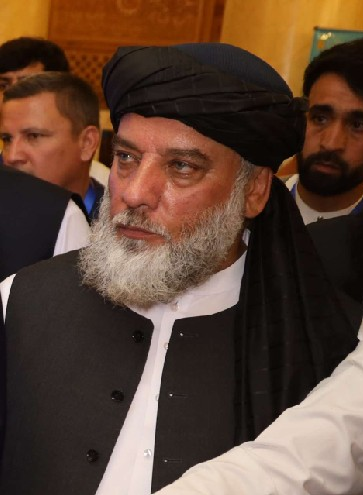
- Azizi in 2026

Minister of Commerce and Industry of Afghanistan
- Incumbent
- Assumed office 21 September 2021 (Note: Acting: 21 September 2021 – 15 August 2025)
- Prime Minister: Mohammad Hassan Akhund
- Deputy: Qudra Ullah Jamal
- Leader: Hibatullah Akhundzada
- Preceded by: Nisar Ahmad Ghoryani

Personal details
- Born: Dasht-e Rewat, Khenj District, Panjshir

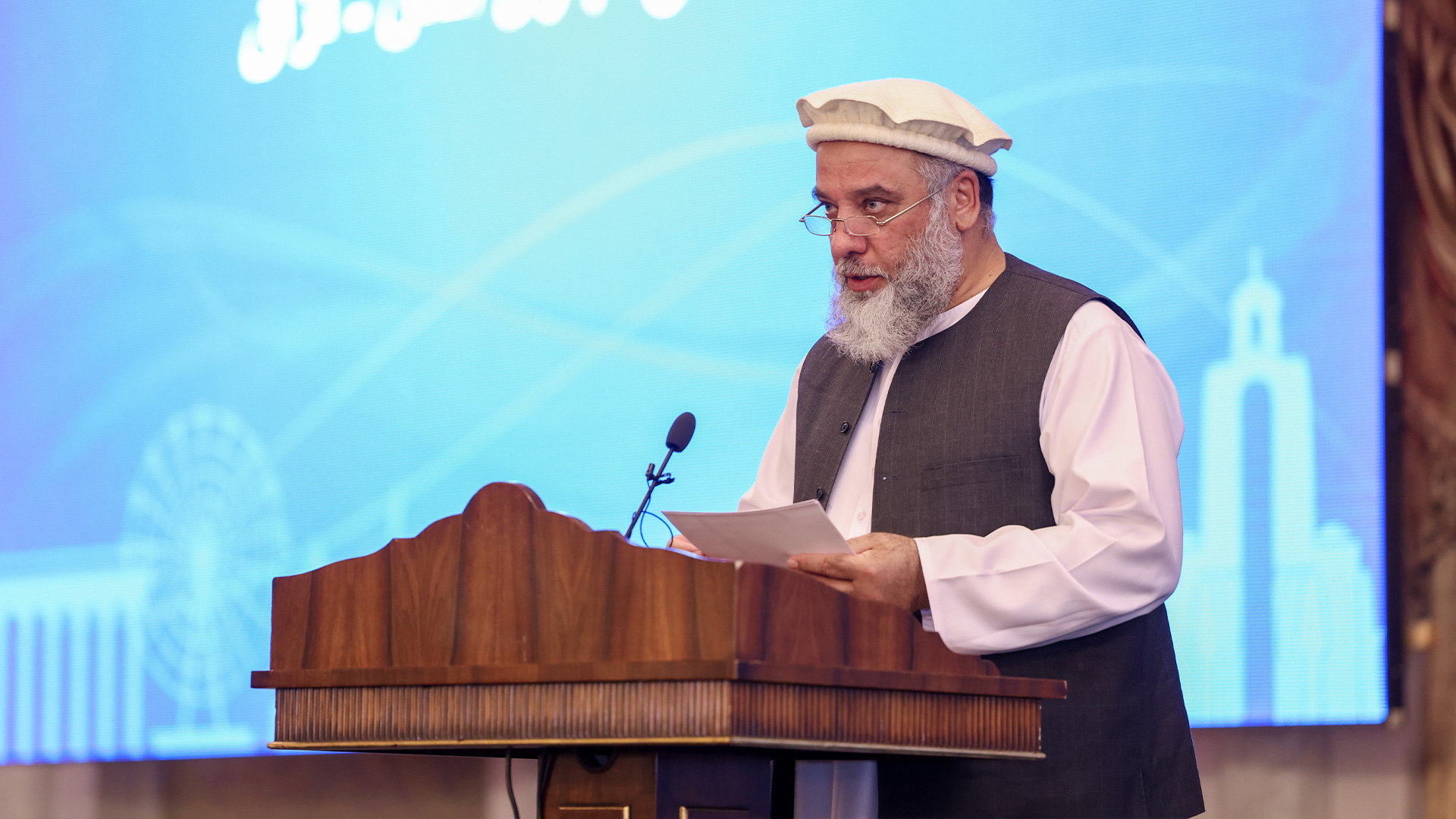
Azizi at the 2025 Third Kazakh-Afghan Business-Forum

Nooruddin Azizi (Dari: نورالدین عزیزي) is an Afghan politician who is serving as minister of Commerce and Industry since 2025, previously serving as acting minister from 2021 to 2025. He is considered one of the leading Tajik members of the Taliban.

== Early life ==
Nooruddin Azizi was born in Dasht-e Rewat, Khenj District in Panjshir Province to an ethnic Tajik family. His father Gulbuddin Azizi was an Islamic cleric.

Nooruddin Azizi was formerly a Hezb-e Islami member. He did not join the Taliban before the reconstruction of the Islamic Emirate.

== Career ==
On 21 September 2021, after the Taliban takeover of Afghanistan, Azizi was appointed as the acting Minister of Commerce and Industry.

On 17 October 2023, Azizi arrived in Beijing to attend the 3rd Belt and Road Forum, amongst the highest-level international forums the Taliban government has been invited to.

On 22 October 2024, Azizi went to Kazan, Russia, to take part of the 16th BRICS summit.

On 24 November 2025, he led an Afghan business delegation visited India. Speaking at a press conference in Delhi, Azizi thanked India’s External Affairs Ministry and Afghanistan’s Foreign Ministry for facilitating the trip. He said technical teams and private-sector representatives from both countries have been in constant touch to explore practical areas of cooperation.
