= Afghan Peace Jirga 2010 =

Afghan President Hamid Karzai announced the holding of a consultative grand council called the Afghanistan's National Consultative Peace Jirga (NCPJ) or Peace Jirga in his inauguration speech on 19 November 2009, after winning elections for a second term, to end the ongoing Taliban insurgency. At the International Afghanistan Conference in London on 28 January 2010, he announced that the government would hold the event in April or May 2010, intended to bring together tribal elders, officials and local power brokers from around the country, to discuss peace and the end of the insurgency. "Jirga" is a word in the Pashto language that means "large assembly" or "council". It is a traditional method in parts of Afghanistan and Pakistan of resolving disputes between tribes or discussing problems affecting whole communities.

President Karzai organized the event on 2–4 June 2010, that was presided by the former Afghan president Burhanuddin Rabbani, despite the Taliban rejecting any overtures. However, after a nine-year U.S.-led war with no clear victory in sight, there were signs many Afghans, including victims of the Taliban's 1996-2001 rule, would be increasingly tempted by the idea of negotiations with the hardline islamists. The event was billed as an attempt to gain consensus on how to approach peace talks with insurgents, but had already met skepticism and even a boycott from some Afghan leaders. About 1,600 delegates, including 300 women, tribal elders, religious leaders and members of parliament from all over the country attended the NCPJ. The three-day assembly represented the first major public debate in Afghanistan on how to end the war. The jirga was meant to be a consultative forum, aimed at the building of a national consensus on a peace plan, likely to be presented to the Kabul Conference on July 20, a gathering of the ministers of foreign affairs of over 70 partner countries of Afghanistan, international and regional organizations and financial institutions.

The NCPJ was expected to be comparable to the two loya jirgas that had been held in Kabul since the collapse of the Taliban regime end of 2001; the first one to confirm Hamid Karzai as a transitional leader and the second in 2003/2004 to approve the constitution of the newly founded Islamic Republic of Afghanistan after the ousting of the Taliban regime. The event was hoped to become a start of a new chapter in Afghanistan’s political life, bringing the country together and strengthening the position of President Karzai.

== Background ==
Article 110, Chapter Six, of Afghanistan's constitution recognises the Loya jirga as "the highest manifestation of the will of the people of Afghanistan". The constitution also lays down the composition of jirga in general. The Afghans trace the history of jirga to time immemorial, while historically the term "Loya jirga" has never been used before the second decade of 20th century.

On the celebrations of Nowruz, New Year's Day, of 1389 (21 March 2010, Western calendar) in Mazar-i-Sharif in Northern Afghanistan, the Afghan Vice President Mohammad Qasim Fahim reached out to militants. He declared that, with their input, the coming national conference would lay the foundations for a peace that would end the Taliban insurgency. He called on resistance forces to participate in a jirga, or assembly, planned for late April or early May. He pledged that the Afghan government "will try to find a peaceful life for those Afghans who are unhappy," a euphemism for militants, though he didn't mention the Taliban by name. Afghans had travelled from across the country to Mazar-i-Sharif united behind the wish that the advent of a new year would bring them peace. According to the police, up to half a million people are in the city to mark the spring equinox and the first day of the traditional Persian new year and celebrated across Central Asia and Iran. Mazar is at the heart of one of the most peaceful regions of the country. City police chief Abdul Rauf Taj said that 4,000 security personnel had been deployed against insurgent attacks and that all visitors were being screened at seven check points around the city perimeter.

Harun Zarghun, chief spokesman for Afghanistan's second largest insurgent group Hezb-e-Islami led by Gulbuddin Hekmatyar, said that a five-member delegation was in Kabul to meet with government officials and that there were also plans to meet with Taliban leaders somewhere in Afghanistan. Khalid Farooqi, a member of the parliament from Paktika province, confirmed that two delegations from Hizb-i-Islami had shown up. Zarghun, the group's spokesman in Pakistan, said that the delegation had a 15-point plan that called for the retreat of foreign forces in July 2010 - a full year ahead of President Barack Obama's intended withdrawal. The plan also called for the replacement of the current Afghan parliament in December 2010 by an interim government, or shura, which then would hold local and national elections within a year. Zarghun said that a new Afghan constitution would be written, merging the current version with ones used earlier.

The event would bring together lawmakers, provincial council chiefs, tribal and religious leaders, and members of civil society—a total of some 1,600 Afghans—to talk about a political resolution to the insurgency.

Many Afghans said their hopes for the NCPJ were low, while organizers played down its aims by emphasizing that it is just one step in a long process. Critics said that the list of invited delegates was stacked with Karzai backers who were not representative of Afghanistan. They also said that the purpose was not clear and that talk of peacemaking means nothing if the Taliban were not present.

The main political opposition bloc, the National Front, complained that its members were intentionally left off the list of invitees. "This sounds like a PR exercise to show that we are making an effort to achieve peace in this country", said Abdullah Abdullah, the bloc's candidate in the 2009 presidential election.

== Postponement ==
The NCPJ was originally scheduled to start in early May. It was pushed back until late May to allow Karzai to visit Washington and speak with U.S. President Barack Obama about the event. During May 2010, the Afghan government said "technicalities" forced it to delay the gathering again, this time until June 2. According to a spokesman for the jirga, Gul Agha Ahmadi Wardak, it was difficult trying to arrange the logistics for bringing so many local and regional delegates to Kabul from across the whole country.

A minority of about 45 of the 249 members of the Wolesi Jirga (Lower House) threatened to boycott the NCPJ unless Karzai responded to their demand to submit names of new cabinet nominees to replace those rejected by the parliament in January 2010. The president submitted his list of cabinet nominees to the parliament twice, but many of the proposed ministers did not receive a vote of confidence from the parliament. The Parliament had refused to confirm 11 of Karzai's 25 nominees.

Although no senior members of the Taliban were expected to attend the NCPJ, the gathering was meant to include some other supporters of the insurgency, including delegates with ties to extremist leader Gulbuddin Hekmatyar.

== Absence of Taliban and Hezb-i-Islami ==
The Taliban publicly rejected the NCPJ, terming it a phony reconciliation process aimed at securing the interests of foreign powers. They reiterated their stance of not holding peace talks until foreign troops left Afghanistan (in May 2010 NATO had 130,000 troops in the country, likely to rise to 150,000 by August 2010) and announced the launch of a new offensive against foreign and Afghan troops, diplomats, and government workers. In spite of previous openings, not only the Taliban but also the Hezb-i-Islami led by warlord Gulbuddin Hekmatyar, as well as several other insurgent leaders, dismissed the jirga. Hekmatyar announced to open talks with the Afghan government after US President Barack Obama and other Western leaders mentioned the possibility of troop withdrawal as early as July 2011. Some of Hekmatyar's demands – such as foreign troop starting to withdraw already by July 2010 and early elections – were unlikely to be accepted by the US and the Afghan government. The 15-point peace plan that his organization delivered in March included several controversial demands. The government would keep its current form after the troops left and the newly elected parliament would review the Constitution. The group hinted a promise to prevent Al Qaeda from operating in the country.

== Attack ==
Some 12,000 security personnel were on guard against attack from the Taliban, but could not prevent that attacks launched by the Taliban targeted the opening session of the NCPJ on June 2. President Hamid Karzai's speech was interrupted by gunfire and nearby rocket explosions. The first rocket attack struck near the jirga site during his opening address. A gunfight then ensued as police attacked suspected suicide bombers attempting to detonate explosives near the tent where the assembly was held, and a second rocket was later launched. There were no reported casualties among the approximately 1,600 delegates who attended the NCPJ. The Afghan police said they had shot and killed two suspected suicide bombers and taken a third into custody. The Taliban claimed responsibility for the attack. A Taliban spokesman claimed they had sent four suicide bombers to target the assembly, and said they were shooting rockets into the tent from the roof of a nearby building. The attack marked a major failure of the security effort for the meeting. Given the presence of the country's top leaders and foreign diplomats at the venue, the attacks on the NCPJ were seen as a major security failure.

Nevertheless, Karzai called on the insurgents to give up their arms. In his speech he called the Taliban “brothers” and “dear Talibs”. He described their flight to Pakistan and their fighting as an understandable reaction to injustices done by local Afghans who had “disturbed them“ and by foreign troops. “To those Taliban compelled to flee by the government’s and foreign troops’ mistakes, they are welcome and can come and join us” he said. Not welcome were those connected to Al Qaeda and those who have harmed innocent Afghans.

== The meeting ==
When the NCPJ actually took place, on 2–4 June 2010, the three-day meeting's ending was marked by debate on the plan of the Afghan government to end the country's long civil war and a bombing attempt in the streets of Kabul. There was little indication that the Taliban were inclined to negotiate. Their key demand, expressed outside the jirga, is that all foreign forces withdraw from Afghanistan before any negotiations can begin.

President Karzai wanted to use the conference to enlist support for his plan to offer economic incentives to reformed militants. He has proposed offering amnesty and reintegration incentives to people who leave the organization. He also offered to negotiate the removal of some individual Taliban members from a U.N. blacklist and to give certain leaders asylum in another Islamic country to enable peace talks. Participants of the NCPJ pressed for the release of some detainees in U.S. custody.

The jirga said that insurgent prisoners should be released, as a goodwill gesture that would precede peace talks with the Taliban. It also emphasized that insurgents who want to participate in the peace process had to cut their ties with foreign terrorist groups, such as al-Qaeda.

Karzai's plan to seek a truce with the Taliban drew support of the Afghan leaders present at the NCPJ, but no solid negotiation blueprint emerged. The delegates also called for the international force to take greater steps to avoid civilian casualties.

== Results ==
After the NCPJ, President Karzai ordered a review of all cases of Taliban suspects being held in Afghan jails and said that those being detained on doubtful evidence should be released. This step was his first official response to the council, that had recommended that Taliban prisoners being held in Afghan custody and by the U.S. military should be released if they were being held on "inaccurate statements or unsubstantiated allegations." At the moment of the jirga, hundreds of Taliban and other militant suspects were being held in Afghan jails across the country. Hundreds more, including al-Qaeda operatives suspected of involvement in terrorism, were being held in U.S. military jails in Afghanistan and Cuba.

Karzai ordered the formation of a special delegation including officials from the Afghan Supreme Court, a government-backed reconciliation commission, the Justice Ministry and other judicial officers. The delegation had to "identify those prisoners who are in jails with not enough evidence".

Since October 15, 1999, UN Security Council Resolution 1267 had blacklisted 142 Taliban figures as well as 360 others with ties to Al Qaeda, ordering their bank accounts seized and prohibiting them from crossing international borders. On 27 January 2010, five Taliban insurgents were de-listed before the London Conference on Afghanistan, leaving 137 still blacklisted. Since then, President Karzai had been arguing to remove all Taliban names from the blacklist. He suggested that de-listing should include even the Taliban leader, Mullah Muhammad Omar and the warlord Gulbuddin Hekmatyar.

On 12 June 2010, at a news conference, Staffan di Mistura, the secretary general’s special representative to Afghanistan, said the United Nations was responding to the call to remove the names of Taliban leaders from the international terrorist blacklist, A delegation from the Security Council’s Al Qaeda and Taliban Sanctions Committee would study the composition of the terrorist blacklist and make recommendations to the Security Council about possible changes.

American officials had argued for removal from the blacklist on a case-by-case basis; Russia and China had objected as well to a broad de-listing of the Taliban.

In July 2010, Richard Barrett, since March 2004 the coordinator of the monitoring team of the so-called 1267 Committee on al-Qaida and the Taliban, said that removing former Taliban members from the sanction list was a key issue for both the Afghan government and the Taliban. There was a list of 10 candidates to be removed.

Already in June, several Taliban suspects were actually released. A new commission was formed to release suspected Taliban prisoners. This commission set free 14 detainees primarily from U.S. custody, two of them boys, and more than two dozen more releases became imminent. The five-member committee had no representation from the intelligence service or any other security agency. Thousands could be freed under the deal, with the warden of Afghanistan's notorious Pul-e-Charkhi prison saying 1,000 Taliban could now be freed from his jail alone.

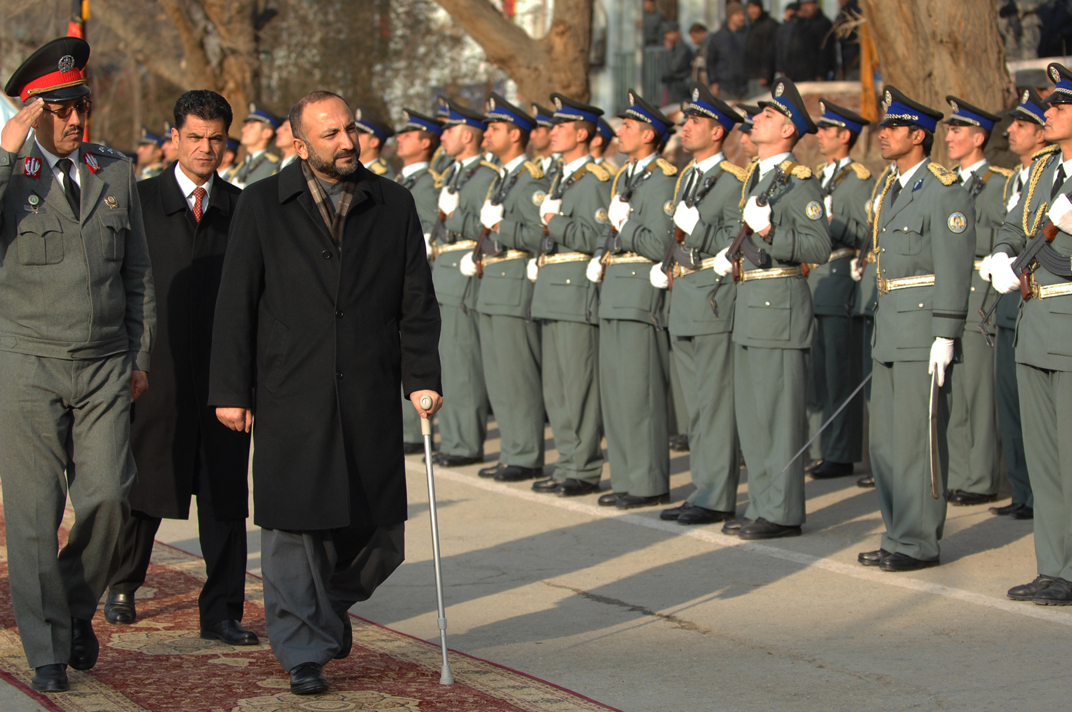
Interior Minister Mohammad Hanif Atmar passing by Afghan National Police honor guards shortly before he stepped down after the NCPJ

On the same day that the review of cases of detained insurgents had been ordered, the chief of the National Directorate of Security Amrullah Saleh and interior minister Hanif Atmar resigned, to take responsibility for their failure in the security of the event, as militants had been able to launch an attack during the opening speech of Karzai. Saleh, considered as a hardliner who has railed against Karzai’s desire for reconciliation efforts to bring the Taliban to the table, was temporarily replaced by Engineer Ibrahim Spinzada. The Interior Ministry revealed that the Taliban had been planning a much larger attack against the NCPJ, that entailed 14 suicide bombers and three other militants. Nine militants equipped with suicide bomb vests and other weapons were arrested before they could enter Kabul. Before the jirga started, police also arrested three other insurgents, one of whom was from Tajikistan and another from Russia, who allegedly were planning suicide attacks.

A few days after the jirga, Karzai summoned Hanif Atmar and Amrullah Saleh to explain why they were not able to prevent the attacks but Saleh and Atmar could not come out with a good answer so they decided to resign.

I accept my failure for not being able to stop terrorists from sabotaging the event and thus resign on moral grounds... My resignation was associated with some other reasons and sensitivities as well.

— Amrullah Saleh

He said later that the main reason for his disagreement was Karzai's ordering of the remission of Taliban prisoners.

== Discussion on women's rights ==
Before the event, gender activists pressed the administration of President Karzai for a part in any deal-making with Taliban fighters and leaders. "We have not been approached by the government," said Samira Hamidi, director of the Afghan Women's Network. The Taliban's repression of women helped galvanize international opposition in the 1990s, and by some measures democracy had revolutionized Afghan women's lives. They feared that behind closed doors and desperate for a peace settlement, the Afghan government might not be able to force Taliban leaders to accept women's rights.

== See also ==
- Politics of Afghanistan
- Karzai administration
- Operation Moshtarak
