= International Conference on Afghanistan, London (2006) =

The Afghanistan Compact was the outcome of the London Conference on Afghanistan in 2006. It was the result of consultations of the government of Afghanistan with the United Nations and the international community and established the framework for international cooperation with Afghanistan for the following five years. The Afghanistan Compact is a political commitment of the participants and not an actionable treaty.

== Introduction ==
On January 31 and February 1, 2006, 66 states and 15 international organizations participated in the London Conference on Afghanistan, which was chaired by British Prime Minister Tony Blair, Afghanistan's President Hamid Karzai and UN Secretary-General Kofi Annan. The government of Afghanistan provided an overview of developments in the country and of its strategies, priorities and plans for economic and political development in the following five years. At the end of the conference, the delegates adopted the Afghanistan Compact, a political agreement between the international community and the government of Afghanistan.

The agreement confirms the commitment of both the government of Afghanistan and the international community to cooperate in creating conditions allowing the people of Afghanistan to live in peace and security under the rule of law, with a strong government which protects human rights and supports economic and social development in the country.

The compact followed the formal conclusion of the Bonn process, which had launched the reconstruction process in 2001 and reached its goal in the parliamentary and provincial elections in 2005. It serves as a basis for the next stage of reconstruction, which is to rely more strongly on the country's own institutions. The donor countries and institutions promised to support this process with a total of 10.5 billion US dollars.

== Individual measures (selection) ==
=== Goal: Increased security ===
- A professional and ethnically balanced Afghan National Army with up to 70.000 soldiers is to be established and fully functional by 2010.
- The police being formed is to provide reliable security in the country and at the borders.
- Reduction of existing mine fields by 70%.
- Disarmament of all illegal militias by 2007 at the latest.

=== Goal: Drug reduction ===
The government of Afghanistan increases its measures to curb drugs, with the goal of completely ending the cultivation of opium poppy in Afghanistan and cutting off the supply of raw opium from Afghanistan to hinder the production of and trade in heroin.

=== Goal: Efficient executive ===
- Government personnel is to be reduced to provide an efficient public administration.
- The National Action Plan for Women in Afghanistan is to increase women's chances of working in government and public service.

=== Goal: Economic and social development ===
- The government's revenues are to be nearly doubled to approximately 8% of the gross domestic product by 2010.
- 66% of households in major urban areas and 25% in rural areas are to be provided with electricity.
- 50% of households in the capital Kabul and 30% of households in other major urban areas are to have access to piped water.
- At least 60% of girls and at least 75% of boys are to be enrolled in primary schools.
- At least 90% of the population are to have access to basic health services.
- The proportion of people living on less than 1 US dollar a day is to decrease by 3% each year.
- The proportion of people who suffer from hunger is to be reduced by 5% each year.

=== Monitoring ===
A Joint Coordination and Monitoring Board, co-chaired by a senior Afghan official and the Special Representative of the UN Secretary-General for Afghanistan, ensures implementation and monitoring of the steps of this five-year plan.

== Participating Countries ==
- Afghanistan (co-Chair)
- Australia
- Austria
- Bahrain
- Belgium
- Brazil
- Brunei
- Bulgaria
- Canada
- China
- Czech Republic
- Denmark
- Egypt
- Finland
- France
- Germany
- Greece
- Hungary
- Iceland
- India
- Iran
- Italy
- Japan
- Jordan
- Kazakhstan
- Kuwait
- Kyrgyzstan
- Lithuania
- Luxembourg
- Malaysia
- Netherlands
- New Zealand
- Norway
- Pakistan
- Poland
- Portugal
- Qatar
- Romania
- Russia
- Saudi Arabia
- South Korea
- Spain
- Sweden
- Switzerland
- Tajikistan
- Turkey
- Turkmenistan
- United Arab Emirates
- United Kingdom (co-Chair)
- United States of America
- Uzbekistan

== Participating Organisations ==
- Aga Khan Foundation
- Asian Development Bank
- European Commission
- European Union
- Islamic Development Bank
- International Monetary Fund
- North Atlantic Treaty Organization
- Organisation of the Islamic Conference
- United Nations (co-chair)
- World Bank

== Observers ==
- Argentina
- Chile
- Croatia
- Cyprus
- Estonia
- Ireland
- Latvia
- Macedonia
- Malta
- Oman
- Organization for Security and Co-operation in Europe
- Singapore
- Slovakia
- Slovenia

== See also ==
- International Conference on Afghanistan London 2010
- List of international conferences on Afghanistan
- Politics of Afghanistan
