= Mohammad Shakir Kargar =

Afghan politician (born 1967)

Mohammad Shaker Kargar
- Dari: محمد شاکر کارگر
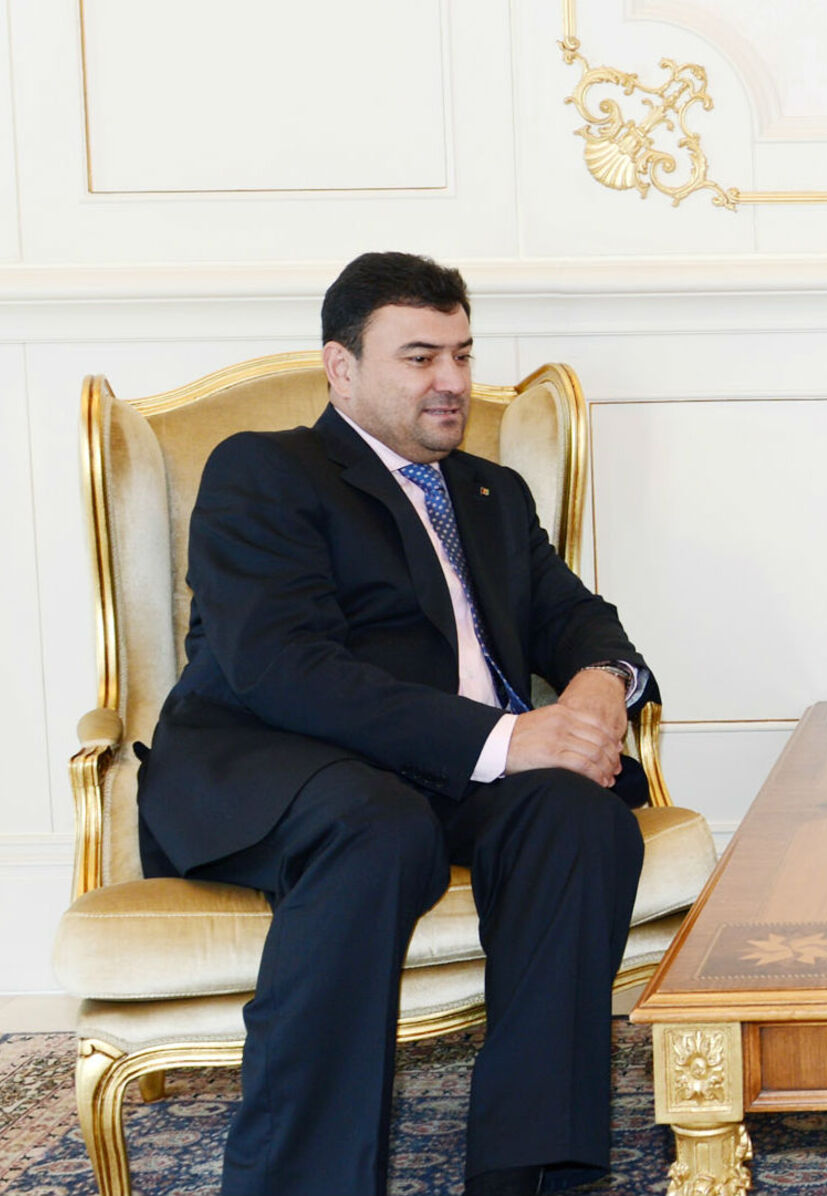

Head the administration of the President of the Islamic Republic of Afghanistan
- In office 31 March 2020 – 15 August 2021

The special representative of the President of Afghanistan for cooperation with Russia and the CIS countries
- In office 2015–2019

Minister of Trade and Industry of Afghanistan
- In office 2013–2015

Minister of Energy and Water of Afghanistan
- In office 2004–2005

Vice president of Afghan Transitional Authority of Afghanistan
- In office 2002–2004

Head The Ministry of Energy and Water Resources of Afghanistan
- In office 2001–2002

Personal details
- Born: Mohammad Shaker Kargar; 2 February 1967 (age 59) Andkhoy District, Faryab Province, Kingdom of Afghanistan
- Spouse: Ella Kargar
- Children: Alp-Arsalan Kargar; Lala Kargar
- Education: Herzen University

Mohammad Shaker Kargar (Dari: محمد شاکر کارگر, born 2 February 1967) is an Afghan politician, who has served as the chief of staff to President Ashraf Ghani of the Islamic Republic of Afghanistan.

== Early life and education ==
Shaker Kargar was born on 2 February 1967 in Andkhoy District, Faryab province (Afghanistan). His father - Abdul Rasul Kargar - is a famous teacher and a mayor of the city Andkhoy.

Mohammad Shaker started his primary education in 1973 at Andkhoy central school, and then continued his secondary education at Shah Shahid School in Kabul province and finally ended a high school at Abu Muslim Andkhoy with honour.

For the higher education, he enrolled at the Kabul University in 1984. Then he received a scholarship for continued study at master level in the field of Rights and History at Governmental University of Hertsen Petersburg in 1991. Finally, M. Shaker received a doctorate in philosophical sciences.

In 2011 Mohammad Shaker Kargar has received an Honorary doctorate in international law from The Herzen State Pedagogical University of Russia.

== Career ==
Educated in 1993, Mohammad Shaker has started working as CEO of international business companies. For peace and stability in Afghanistan, he also participates in many national and international peaceful and political meetings in different countries, such as the United States, Canada, the Netherlands, Turkey, Italy and The Commonwealth of Independent States.

In 2001 he participated in the Bonn conference as the First Deputy President of Afghanistan and representative of Abdul Rashid Dostum, after that he was commissioned to head The Ministry of Energy and Water Resources as part of the interim government of the Islamic Republic of Afghanistan.

In 2002 following the results of the Bonn conference, Shaker became one of the 5 vice presidents of Afghan Transitional Authority.

2003 - 2005. He served as Minister of Energy and Water. As minister, he actively participated in the development of infrastructure of Afghanistan.

In 2005 Mohammad Shaker Kargar was elected as a deputy of the Wolesi Jirga from the Northern province of Faryab and was appointed to the Parliamentary Commission on International Relations.

In 2012 Mohammad Kargar was named Afghanistan's ambassador to the Republic of Azerbaijan. He made a great contribution to the development of relations between countries.

In 2013 he was appointed Minister of Trade and Industry.

Since 2015, he named the special representative of the President of Afghanistan for cooperation with Russia and the CIS countries. In 2019 he resigned from this post.

In 2020 Mohammad Shaker was appointed to head the administration of the President of the Islamic Republic of Afghanistan.

== Personal life ==
Mohammad Shaker Kargar is married, has two children, a son and a daughter.

== See also ==
- Politics of Afghanistan
- Economy of Afghanistan
- Ashraf Ghani
