= 2023 Belt and Road Forum =

International summit during 17–18 October 2023

3rd Belt and Road Forum for International Cooperation
- Host country: China
- Date: 17–18 October 2023
- Cities: Beijing
- Precedes: Second BRI Forum

The 3rd Belt and Road Forum for International Cooperation was held between 17 and 18 October 2023 in Beijing, China. It marked the 10th anniversary of the Belt and Road Initiative (BRI).

== Background ==
The BRI is a global infrastructure and investment project announced by Chinese paramount leader Xi Jinping in 2013. The Belt and Road Forum for International Cooperation was previously held in 2017 and 2019.

== Agreements ==
At the Third Belt and Road International Forum in October 2023, China signed hundreds of BRI-related agreements, with a focus on green technology (as well as digital commerce).

== Participants and representatives ==
=== Heads of state and government ===
- China (Host):
- CCP General Secretary & President Xi Jinping
- Premier Li Qiang

The forum is attended by foreign heads of state and government and their respective delegations:

- Argentina: President Alberto Fernández
- Cambodia: Prime Minister Hun Manet
- Chile: President Gabriel Boric
- Congo: President Denis Sassou Nguesso
- Egypt: Prime Minister Mostafa Madbouly
- Ethiopia: Prime Minister Abiy Ahmed
- Hungary: Prime Minister Viktor Orbán
- Indonesia: President Joko Widodo
- Kazakhstan: President Kassym-Jomart Tokayev
- Kenya: President William Ruto
- Laos: President Thongloun Sisoulith
- Mongolia: President Ukhnaagiin Khürelsükh
- Mozambique: Prime Minister Adriano Maleiane
- Pakistan: Prime Minister Anwaar ul Haq Kakar
- Papua New Guinea: Prime Minister James Marape
- Russia: President Vladimir Putin
- Serbia: President Aleksandar Vučić
- Sri Lanka: President Ranil Wickremesinghe
- Thailand: Prime Minister Srettha Thavisin
- Uzbekistan: President Shavkat Mirziyoyev
- Vietnam: President Võ Văn Thưởng

=== Heads of international organizations ===
- ASEAN: Secretary-General Kao Kim Hourn
- New Development Bank: President Dilma Rousseff
- United Nations: Secretary-General António Guterres

=== Other attendees ===
- Afghanistan: Acting Minister of Commerce and Industry Nooruddin Azizi
- Nepal: Deputy Prime Minister and Minister of Home Affairs Narayan Kaji Shrestha
- Nigeria: Vice President Kashim Shettima
- Turkmenistan: Chairman of the People's Council of Turkmenistan Gurbanguly Berdimuhamedow, Deputy Prime Minister and Foreign Minister Raşit Meredow
- United Arab Emirates: Member of the Federal Supreme Council and Ruler of the Emirate of Ras Al Khaimah Saud bin Saqr Al Qasimi
