= Afghanistan National Standards Authority =

Standards organization of Afghanistan

ANSA
- Afghanistan National Standards Authority
- Abbreviation: ANSA
- Location: Afghanistan
- Acting head: Faizullah Akhund
- Technical Assistant: Mufti Mohammad Hamid
- Parent organization: Minister of Commerce and Industry
- Affiliations: Minister of Commerce and Industry
- Website: www.ansa.gov.af/index.php/en

Afghanistan National Standards Authority (ANSA) is an authority under the framework of the Ministry of Commerce and Industry. Mullah Faizullah Akhund is the current acting head of the authority.
