= Mohammed Alim Razm =

Ethnic-Uzbek Afghan politician

Mohammed Alim Razm, an ethnic Uzbek, is key political advisor to Abdul Rashid Dostum and a former minister in the Afghan government. Between December 2001 and July 2002 he was Minister of Mines and Industries in the Afghan Interim Authority. Subsequently, he was Minister of Light Industries in the Afghan Transitional Administration until October 2004.
