= Holger Ziegeler =

German physicist and diplomat (born 1961)

Holger G. Ziegeler (born June 20, 1961, in Regensburg) is a German physicist and diplomat.

He studied mathematics, physics and general linguistics at the University of Regensburg, the University of Vienna, and as a Fulbright scholar at the Ohio State University in Columbus (Ohio), obtaining his Master of Science degree in 1984 and the title of Diplom-Physiker in 1987. After initial research in particle physics, he turned to artificial intelligence (neural networks, knowledge engineering, hypertext) in the course of his work for Siemens Austria (1987-1992).

After joining the German diplomatic service in 1992, Ziegeler held different positions in Germany, Paraguay, the United States, and Ethiopia. Between 2007 and 2011, he focused on multilateral development policy with the World Bank Group. He was instrumental in the creation of the IFC Infrastructure Crisis Facility and initiated the German Federal Government‘s concept on powers shaping globalization.

During 2011 Ziegeler served as Coordinator of the International Afghanistan-Conference in Bonn.

In 2012, he was appointed Director of the German Information Center USA in Washington, D.C. He joined the Federation of German Industries in Berlin in 2013 as Special Representative for International Economic Partnerships and Alliances and returned in 2014 to the Federal Foreign Office as Head of International Economic Promotion in Countries and Regions.

In 2016, he was appointed as German Consul General in Jeddah, Saudi Arabia, and (effective 2018) Special Representative for the Organisation of Islamic Cooperation (OIC). In July 2020, he received a new commission as Consul General in Karachi, Pakistan, where he served until October 2022 before assuming responsibility for the digitalization strategy and national digitalization policy in the Foreign Office. Based on his earlier professional background, he initiated the AI Charter ("KI Charta") of the Federal Foreign Office, which published guiding principles for the responsible and effective use of AI in February 2025. He retired in 2025.
