= Faizullah Akhund =

Afghan Taliban politician

Faizullah Akhund فیض الله آخوند

Director of the Afghanistan National Standards Authority
- Incumbent
- Assumed office 14 March 2022 (Note: Acting: 14 March 2022 – 15 August 2025)
- Prime Minister: Mohammad Hassan Akhund
- Leader: Hibatullah Akhundzada

Deputy Minister of Information and Culture for Youth Affairs
- In office 23 November 2021 – 14 March 2022
- Leader: Hibatullah Akhundzada
- Succeeded by: Abdul Rahim Saqib

Personal details
- Party: Taliban
- Profession: Politician

Mullah Faizullah Akhund is an Afghan Taliban politician who is serving as head of the Afghanistan National Standards Authority since 14 March 2022. Akhund has also served as Deputy Minister of youth affairs at Information and Culture Ministry from 23 November 2021 to 14 March 2022.
