= List of international conferences on Afghanistan =

After the ousting of the Taliban in 2001, repeatedly international conferences on the future of Afghanistan were held at several places. the first conference took place from 27 November to 5 December 2001 on the Petersberg in Königswinter near Bonn.

The major conferences were:

- International Conference on Afghanistan Bonn 2001
- International Conference on Afghanistan Berlin 2004
- International Conference on Afghanistan London 2006
- International Conference on the Rule of Law in Afghanistan Rome 2007
- International Conference on Afghanistan Paris 2008
- International Conference on Afghanistan Moscow 2009
- International Conference on Afghanistan The Hague 2009
- International Conference on Afghanistan London 2010
- International Conference on Afghanistan Bonn 2011
- International Conference on Afghanistan London 2014
- International Conference on Afghanistan Geneva 2020

== See also ==
- United Nations
- Politics of Afghanistan
- Summit (meeting)
