= Abdul Rahim Karimi =

Abdul Rahim Karimi was Minister of Justice of Afghanistan between December 2001 and October 2004 in the Afghan Interim Authority and the Afghan Transitional Administration. He was replaced by Sarwar Danish when Karzai reshuffled his cabinet when he was elected president in 2004.

Karimi, an ethnic Uzbek Islamic law professor from Takhar who lacked an independent power base as he was aligned with the Shura-e Nazar, the Jamiat-e Islami and the Northern Alliance, was installed as minister by the Bonn Conference, following the defeat of the Taliban government.

== Warlords ==
As a minister with a background United Islamic Front he is reported to have said that all Afghan refugees were welcome to return after the Taliban-era, except for communists, indicating that he still saw the world through the lens of the Cold War. He also took a stance against the Islamic warlords however. In November 2002 he said that government laws could not be enforced in parts of the country were warlords were still in power. A judge could not make fair decisions in areas ruled by Mujahideen commanders, and as a consequence, in much of Afghanistan, the rule of the gun continues to prevailed over the rule of law.

== Sharia ==
Islamists wanted that the legal system of Afghanistan would be drawn solely from Sharia law. But Karimi intended for the new legal code to be based no more than 20 percent on Islamic jurisprudence. He claimed that the Islam of his government is different from the Islam of the Taliban, but defended the fact that Sharia law remained in place: "people would not understand if we would get rid of it" completely. Under his leadership, Afghanistan signed up as a member of the International Criminal Court. He was also responsible for the new electoral law, providing for presidential and parliamentary elections.
