= Samoon Jirga =

Afghan organization

- سمون جرګه
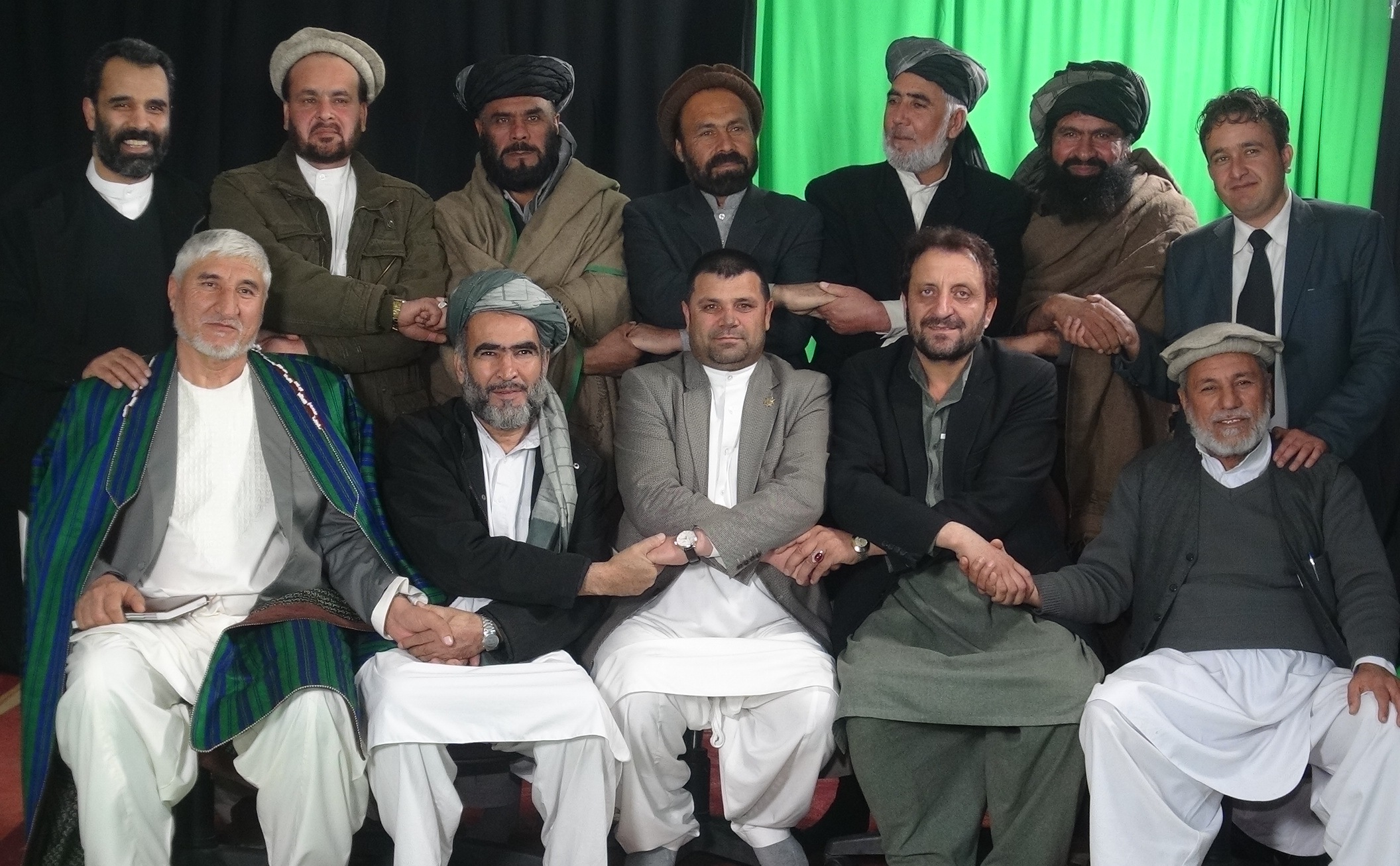
- 7th Samoon Jirga, February 2013
- Headquarters: Kabul, Afghanistan
- Website: www.samoon.org

The Samoon Jirga (Reforms Assembly) is an Afghan pressure group, a political think tank, a research & policy organization, that is voluntarily formed by elites, thinkers, businessman, leading professionals, political leaders, provincial, Wolesi Jirga and Meshrano Jirga members, tribal elders and leaders.

Members are reformist and as founding members of the assembly, voluntarily work to reform, debate, research and recommend means for a favorable social, political and economic environment where responsible citizenship and governments can be formed, sustained and transferred in Afghanistan. Membership is based on acceptance, guarantee and recommendation of existing members and is open only to the leading members of any structure of Afghan society.

The principles are traditional Jirga values, and conduct is progressing based on the declarations of the Jirga members consensus.

Samoon Jirga does not have any appointed or elected leaders; chairmanship during meetings and activities is rotational or professional among the leading members.

== Issues under discussion ==
- Fair and Free Election Using Modern Technologies and Approaches
- Census in Afghanistan Using Modern Technologies and Approaches
- Electronic National Identity Cards
