= Mangal Hussain =

Afghan politician

Mangal Hussain is an Afghan who has held a variety of political and military offices.

According to the Asia Times he was one of the most powerful leaders in the Hezbi Islami Gulbuddin, prior to the emergence of the Taliban. Hamid Karzai appointed Mangal Hussain to his cabinet.
