= Kai Eide =

Norwegian diplomat & writer (born 1949)

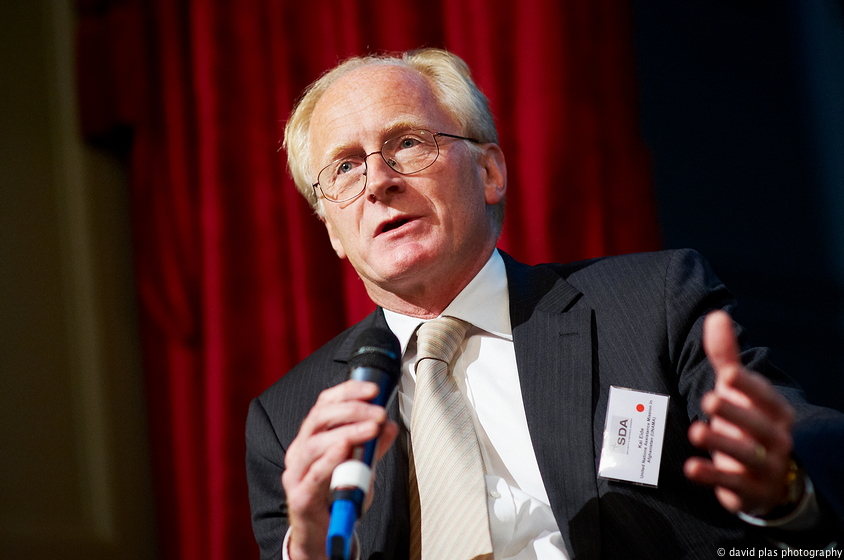
- Eide in 2010.
- Born: Kai Aage Eide; 28 February 1949 (age 77); Sarpsborg, Norway
- Occupations: Diplomat and writer
- Spouse: Gro Holm

Kai Aage Eide (born 28 February 1949 in Sarpsborg) is a Norwegian diplomat and writer. He was appointed the United Nations Special Representative to Afghanistan and Head of the United Nations Assistance Mission in Afghanistan (UNAMA) on 7 March 2008, a position he held until March 2010 when Staffan de Mistura took over.

Eide has previously served as the Special Envoy of the United Nations Secretary-General in Kosovo in 2005. His report to the Secretary General of the United Nations on the political situation in former Serbian province of Kosovo resulted in the launching of the negotiations that ultimately brought about a controversial and disputed unilateral declaration of independence of Kosovo in 2008. Eide has also Special Representative of the Secretary-General in Bosnia and Herzegovina in 1997–1998.

He has been a member of the Norwegian Foreign Service since 1975. He was the Norwegian ambassador to North Atlantic Treaty Organization (NATO) from 2002 to 2006, and to the Organization for Security and Cooperation in Europe (OSCE) from 1998 to 2002. He has also been posted as Special Adviser on the Balkans at the Norwegian Ministry of Foreign Affairs and as Norway's ambassador at the International Conference for the former Yugoslavia.

While being a member of the Labour Party today, he has been active in national politics; for the Conservative Party. In the Syse government (1989–90), he was appointed State Secretary in the Office of the Prime Minister. He later served as a deputy representative to the Norwegian Parliament from Akershus during the 1993–97 term.

Eide holds a cand.mag. degree from the University of Oslo in 1975, where he studied political science, international law, French and literature.

== Firing of Peter Galbraith ==
UN deputy special representative in Afghanistan Peter Galbraith, Eide's subordinate, was fired by United Nations Secretary-General Ban Ki-moon after he urged UNAMA to take actions to prevent fraud in the 2009 Afghan presidential elections and to take action, consistent with its mandate to support "free, fair and transparent" elections once the fraud took place. After being informed of his dismissal, Galbraith wrote Ban Ki-moon a letter accusing Eide of helping to cover up electoral fraud and favoring Hamid Karzai.

On 11 December 2009 Kai Eide, announced that he would step down from his post in March. He said he was not resigning but simply fulfilling a commitment he made to his family in March 2008 to spend only two years in Kabul. De Mistura, a Swedish-Italian diplomat who earlier headed the UN mission in Baghdad, was appointed as his successor.

Eide proposed the appointment of a senior civilian representative to coordinate relief efforts by the U.S.-led forces in Afghanistan. He also urged the UN leadership to allow his successor to hire more staff from the United States and other Western countries, saying it would increase their confidence that their money is being properly spent.

Peter Galbraith, in an interview with Foreign Policy, maintains that Eide did not resign voluntarily as he claimed, but was forcibly removed: "Kai's problem was that he valued his relationship with Karzai above all else, including having honest elections...He was so discredited by the way he handed the election and the fallout from engineering my ouster. He cut his own throat." Galbraith predicted that Eide would be replaced by Swedish diplomat De Mistura.

Shortly after this comment by Galbraith, Kai Eide accused Galbraith of proposing to enlist the White House in a plan to force the Afghan president Hamid Karzai to resign, and ultimately install a more Western-friendly figure as president, like former finance minister Ashraf Ghani or former interior minister Ali Ahmad Jalali. Galbraith explained that he was merely trying to address a constitutional crisis precipitated by Karzai's maneuvering to stay in office a full year beyond the end of his term. In September 2009, the Karzai-appointed Independent Election Commission (IEC) voted 6 to 1 to override its own rules and include enough obviously fraudulent Karzai ballots so as to put Karzai above the 50% needed to avoid a runoff. The IEC then explained that, even if the Electoral Complaints Commission, a separate, independently appointed body empowered to investigate electoral irregularities, threw out enough of these fraudulent ballots so as require a runoff (which was indeed the case), it was not technically possible to have a runoff before May 2010. Since Karzai's term had ended on 21 May 2009, he would illegally be in office a full year after his term ended in circumstances that could provoke unrest and even civil war.

Nonetheless, Eide said that he told Galbraith that the plan was "unconstitutional" and "interference of the worst sort", which, if pursued, would provoke not only a strong international reaction" but also civil insurrection. Eide did not address the issue of Karzai's effort to unconstitutionally extend his term. It was during this conversation that Galbraith proposed taking a leave to the United States, and Eide accepted. Galbraith denied he had pursued the plan and both Vice President Joe Biden and Special Representative Richard Holbrooke, two close Galbraith allies, confirmed that the matter had never been raised with them.

== Negotiations with Taliban ==
In early 2010, Kai Eide put out the word that he had secret exploratory talks with Taliban commanders to discuss peace terms, as emerged end of that month during the International Conference on Afghanistan in London. According to Eide, he met with regional commanders on the Quetta Shura, the Taliban's leadership council, in Dubai on 8 January 2010. This would have been the first such meeting between the UN and alleged senior members of the Taliban, suggesting that peace talks had revived since 2009 exploratory contacts in Saudi Arabia between emissaries of the Afghan government and the Taliban had broken down. It was not clear how significant a faction had shown up in Dubai or how serious they were. A western official confirmed that there were "indications of splits in the Taliban over the prospect of a settlement". Supporters of former presidential candidate Abdullah Abdullah predicted that negotiations could fail because the Karzai government was "too weak", and other critics warned that trying to buy off insurgents created a "moral hazard" of rewarding combatants who had killed Western troops and local civilians. Taliban sources denied that there had been such a meeting and dismissed them as "baseless rumors".

== Oskar Kokoschka Painting ==
While serving as Chairman in Office of the OSCE, Kai Eide arranged for the Norwegian Government to rent a very expensive villa for his use. His landlord subsequently gave him a painting by the German Expressionist artist Oskar Kokoschka which he did not declare to the Norwegian tax authorities. During the subsequent investigation, Kai Eide took a leave from the Norwegian Ministry of Foreign Affairs.

Preceded by Hans Jacob Biørn Lian	Norwegian Permanent Representative to NATO; 2002–2006	Succeeded by Kim Traavik
