= Khenj District =

Khenj خنج
- District
- Location within Afghanistan
- Coordinates: 35.4297°N 69.7844°E
- Country: Afghanistan
- Province: Panjshir

Population
  - Total: 110'000
- Time zone: UTC+04:30 (AST)

Khenj District (Dari: ولسوالی خنج) is the largest district in Panjshir Province with a population of more than 110,000 people. It has roughly 154 villages, including Jungal Aab Village, Mata Village, Ishkesho Village, Pawat Village and Peshghoor. Khenj District is famous for its mining of emeralds. Many people in the district work as farmers and miners.

== See also ==
- Districts of Afghanistan
