= Bonn Agreement (Afghanistan) =

2001 plan on the future government of Afghanistan following the U.S. invasion

The Bonn Agreement (officially the Agreement on Provisional Arrangements in Afghanistan Pending the Re-Establishment of Permanent Government Institutions) was the initial series of agreements passed on December 5, 2001, during an international conference on Afghanistan held in Bonn. It was intended to re-create the Islamic State of Afghanistan following the U.S. invasion of Afghanistan that followed the September 11, 2001, terrorist attacks. Since no nationally agreed-upon government had existed in Afghanistan since 1979, it was felt necessary to have a transition period before a permanent government was established. A nationally agreed-upon government would require at least one loya jirga to be convened; however, in the absence of law and order in the wake of the rapid victory of American and Afghan Northern Alliance forces, immediate steps were felt to be required.

== Overview ==
In December 2001, 25 prominent Afghans met under UN auspices in Bonn, Germany, to decide on a plan for governing the country (see list of signatories at International Conference on Afghanistan, Bonn (2001)). By inviting warlords capable enough to disrupt the state building process, a "big tent" strategy was enacted in order to incorporate, rather than alienate, these non-state actors in Afghan state centralization. As a result, the Afghan Interim Authority (AIA)—made up of 30 members, headed by a chairman—was inaugurated on 22 December 2001 with a six-month mandate to be followed by a two-year Transitional Authority (TA), after which elections were to be held.

One of the sections of the Bonn Agreement envisaged the establishment of the International Security Assistance Force (ISAF). Resolution 1386 of the United Nations Security Council subsequently established ISAF.

== State building in Afghanistan ==
Following the fall of the Taliban in 2001, the Bonn Agreement laid the foundation for U.S. and NATO-backed state-building efforts in Afghanistan. The agreement sought to establish a new constitution, an independent judiciary, free and fair elections, a centralized security sector, and the protection of rights of women and also minorities, such as religious and ethnic groups. This model for state-building in Afghanistan was based on a ‘maximalist model of post-conflict reconstruction’ that surfaced in the 1990s, following international interventions in the Balkans, sub-Saharan Africa and East Timor.

The Bonn Agreement provided a framework for the later constitution that was established in 2004 and the presidential and parliamentary elections that followed. It emphasized the need for strong, centralized government institutions and failed to account for the state's cultural and political history, as the country had previously relied on informal, regional power structures to deliver security and services.

The state-building roadmap that was created by the Bonn Agreement was an inappropriate model for the Afghan case, and later led to a range of issues, including government corruption and incompetency. Since the Bonn Agreement failed to provide shared powers within the Afghanistan government, it spurred an internal war between two of the country's “elite networks”, the North Alliance and the Pashtun Faction. As a result, the North Alliance held most of the cabinet positions in Afghanistan’s government and had large decision-making capabilities. This skew in political power and abundant intra-cabinet rivalries was noted in an early World Bank report that stated, “even within central government, current political divisions and rivalries render impossible any meaningful consensus on even the key policy elements of a comprehensive administrative reform program…” The subsequent failures of the Afghan state, including the inability to provide basic security and social services, stemmed from the ‘overambitious reconstruction model’ that was created by the Bonn Agreement, as well as practical challenges on the ground. Following this event, the Afghan government took on a more informal style in public affairs of pact-making and brokerage. As a result, the Bonn Agreement can be seen as a large setback in the development of Afghanistan as a state and its coexisting political climates.

== Constitution of Afghanistan ==
Under the Bonn Agreement the Afghan Constitution Commission was established to draft a new constitution in consultation with the public. The Bonn Agreement called for a loya jirga to be convened within 18 months of the establishment of the Transitional Authority and for the use of the 1964 constitution as the basis for a new constitution. The constitution had been adopted by the loya Jirga on January 4, 2004.

== Legal system ==
The Bonn Agreement calls for a judicial commission to rebuild the justice system in accordance with Islamic principles, international standards, the rule of law, and Afghan legal traditions.

== Judicial branch ==
The Bonn Agreement called for the establishment of a Supreme Court of Afghanistan.

== See also ==
- Bonn Conference
- International Conference on Afghanistan, London (2010)
- List of international conferences on Afghanistan
