= International Conference on Afghanistan, Bonn (2001) =

Treaty to determine gov't of Afghanistan

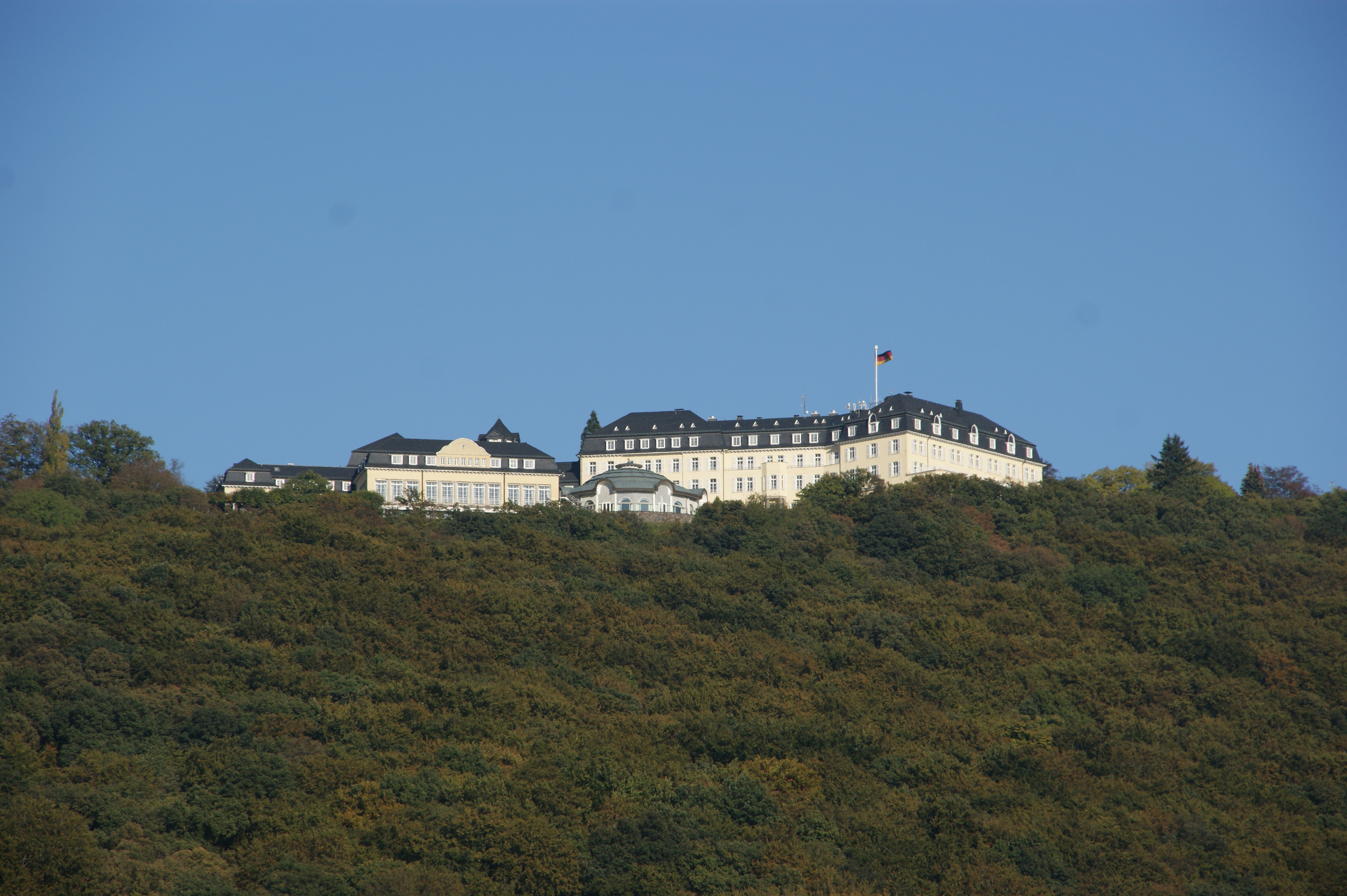
Hotel Petersberg, site of the 2001 International Conference on Afghanistan

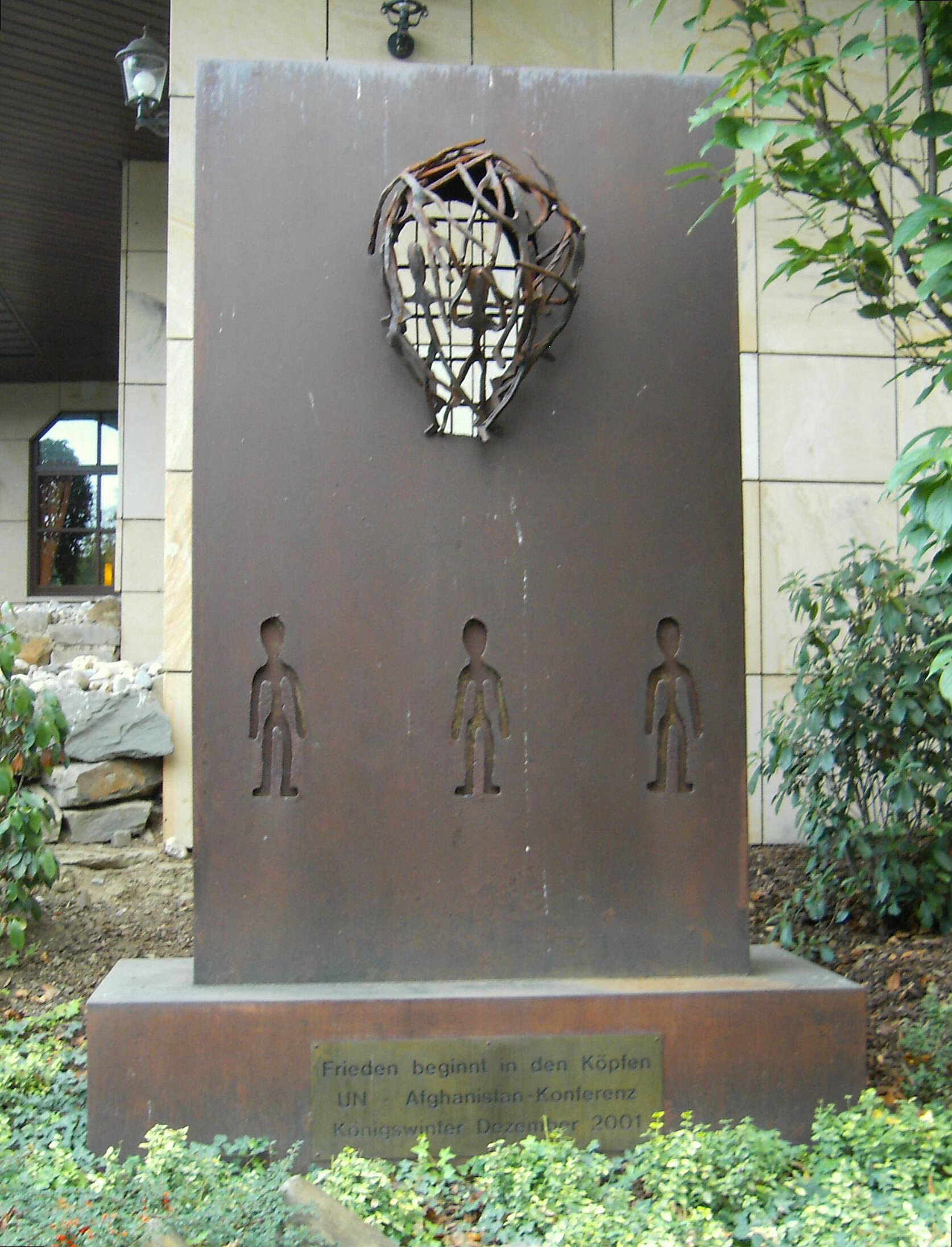
Memorial of the conference in Königswinter

In December 2001, after Operation Enduring Freedom had toppled the Taliban regime of Afghanistan, the German city of Bonn hosted a conference—widely known as the Bonn Conference—of Afghan leaders at the Hotel Petersberg, to choose the leader of an Afghan Interim Authority and establish an initial political agreement for reorganising the governmental institutions of Afghanistan. The conference chose Hamid Karzai, who was subsequently elected president in 2004. Karzai subsequently appointed many anti-Taliban allies and regional leaders to senior posts within the interim government and to senior posts in the Provincial governments. The conference set up the Bonn Agreement for institutional reorganisation.

== Substance ==
The conference opened on November 27, 2001 brought together many adversaries with a common enemy: the Taliban. The US, Russia, and Iran, fervent enemies, all sat down together and cooperated against the Taliban. So too did rivals India and Pakistan. Also included were representatives of the Northern Alliance (the main Taliban adversary within Afghanistan), and various Afghan ethnic and interest groups. Not included were the Taliban themselves, which seemed like an obvious choice at the time since they appeared defeated, but in hindsight their absence may have greatly prolonged the Afghan conflict. The conference was organized by US Secretary of State Colin Powell at the behest of President George W. Bush.

The conference was borne out of necessity: with the Taliban toppled, there was no obvious government in Afghanistan. The country risked sliding back into the anarchical warlord period of the Afghan Civil War (1992–1996), which had seen widespread atrocities and given rise to the Taliban. The conference determined that an interim government would rule for 6 months, followed by a loya jirga (grand assembly) which would create an 18 month transitional government. The transitional government's job would be to create a constitution and organize elections for a permanent government. Who would lead the interim government was the thorniest question. King Mohammed Zahir Shah, in exile in Italy since 1973, had good support but he lacked practical experience in fighting mujahedeen style and was now an elderly 87. Burhanuddin Rabbani, leader of the Jamiat-e Islami, was nominally the current president but needed the backing of the conference if he was to stay in power any longer. Into the fray came Hamid Karzai.

Karzai was a charismatic Pashtun who had gained notice after staging a revolution against the Taliban in the south. He was well liked by the US CIA, who had already had their eyes on him as a potential leader. Pakistan preferred Karzai over the old King, who would have been more anti-Pakistan. A deal was proposed that the King would have a ceremonial role but Karzai would take the lead. Eventually the King himself turned down the idea that he should have a hand in a government, suggesting that Karzai was like a son to him and should lead. This did not sit well with the supporters of Rabbani, but skillful diplomatic maneuvering by Russia, Iran, and the US negotiator James Dobbins gave Karzai the role over Rabbani. In exchange, ethnic Tajiks from the Northern Alliance won half of the cabinet seats. Karzai was informed of his elevation to the presidency on December 5, 2001, only minutes after a US air strike mistakenly targeted him; he had escaped with minor injuries, but 13 others including top advisors were killed. Karzai now had the difficult task of unifying the country after 23 years of constant war—a war that was still not over.

== Signatories to the Bonn Conference ==
Signatories to the Bonn Conference
signatory	appointment	notes
Mr. Sayed Hussein Anwari	Minister of Agriculture, Irrigation and Livestock 2001-2004	
Mr. Hedayat Amin Arsala	Vice President 2001–2004	Member of the Pashtun ethnic group.; Attended University in the United States, and worked at the World Bank.
Mr. Sayed Hamed Gailani		
Mr. Rahmatullah Mousa Ghazi		
Engineer Abdul Hakim	Ministry of Communications (Afghanistan) 2001–2002	Tajik ethnic group.
Mr. Houmayoun Jareer		
Abbas Karimi		
Mr. Sayed Mustafa Kazemi	Minister of Commerce 2001-2004?	
Dr. Azizullah Ludin		
Mr. Ahmad Wali Massoud		
Mr. Hafizullah Asif Mohseni		Son of Muhammad Asif Muhsini
Prof. Mohammad Ishaq Nadiri	Senior Economic Advisor to President Karzai	Currently Jay Gould Professor of Economics at New York University.
Mr. Mohammad Natiqi		Former Afghanistan Commerce Minister.
Mr. Aref Noorzay		
Mr. Yunus Qanuni	Interior Minister	A member of Afghanistan's Tajik ethnic group.
Dr. Zalmai Rassoul	Minister of Civil Aviation 2002-? Minister of Foreign Affairs 2010-2013	
Mr. Mirwais Sadiq		
Dr. Mohammad Jalil Shams	Economic minister 2006-2009	
Professor Abdul Satar Sirat		
Mr. Humayun Tandar		
General Abdul Rahim Wardak	Deputy Minister of Defense	Minister of Defense following the election of 2004 until 2012.
Mr. Azizullah Wasifi	Served under Zahir Shah and Sardar Daud as governor of Nangarhar province and agriculture minister respectively.	
Mr. Pacha Khan Zadran	Governor of Paktia	Fought with other regional militia leaders, replaced in early 2002.; Became a wanted man in 2003.; Currently a member of the National Assembly.
Mr. Lakhdar Brahimi		Special Representative of the Secretary-General for Afghanistan: The United Nations witness to the document

== See also ==
- Bonn Agreement (Afghanistan)
- List of international conferences on Afghanistan
- Politics of Afghanistan
- International Conference on Afghanistan, Bonn (2011)
