= Politics of Afghanistan =

Afghanistan is a unitary theocratic emirate with a totalitarian regime ruled by the Taliban, a political and militant Islamist movement adhering to the Deobandi jihadist ideology with Pashtunwali influences, which holds a monopoly on power. Dissent is not permitted, and politics are mostly limited to internal Taliban policy debates and power struggles. There is no constitution or other basis for the rule of law. The structure is centralised and autocratic, with all power concentrated in the hands of the supreme leader and his clerical advisors. According to the V-Dem Democracy indices Afghanistan was as of 2023 the 4th least electoral democratic country in the world.

Afghanistan has been unstable for decades, with frequent coups, civil wars, and violent transfers of power. Most recently, the Taliban seized power in 2021 from the Western-backed Islamic Republic, and re-formed the government to implement a far stricter interpretation of Sharia law according to the Hanafi school.

== History ==
Government operations in Afghanistan historically have consisted of power struggles, coups and unstable transfers of power. The country has been governed by various systems of government, including a monarchy, republic, theocracy, dictatorship, and a pro-communist state.

- 1709 – Mirwais Hotak founds the Hotaki dynasty at Kandahar and declares Afghanistan (lit. 'land of the Afghans') an independent state.
- 1747 – Ahmad Shah Durrani establishes the Durrani Empire and adds to it new territories.
- 1818 – Execution of Fateh Khan Barakzai, collapse of the Durrani Empire over the next few years.
- 1826 – Rise of Dost Mohammad Khan in Kabul.
- 1838 – British India invades the land during the First Anglo-Afghan War in an attempt to restore Shah Shuja Durrani to the throne of Afghanistan. This would be the beginning of foreign influence in the politics of Afghanistan. The Great Game (rivalry between the British Empire and the Russian Empire over Afghanistan) begins.
- 1842 – The British are defeated and the Barakzais are restored to the throne under Dost Mohammad Khan.
- 1855 – Dost Mohammad Khan adds Kandahar to his realm following the Conquest of Kandahar.
- 1863 – Dost Mohammad Khan completes the re-unification of most of Afghanistan following the Herat campaign of 1862–1863.
- 1863 – Death of Dost Mohammad Khan, the beginning of the Third Afghan Civil War over the succession of Dost Mohammad.
- 1869 – Sher Ali Khan comes up victorious in the Afghan civil war.
- 1878 – Beginning of the Second Anglo-Afghan War, with the British seeking to expel Russian influence in the country.
- 1880 – End of the Second Anglo-Afghan War, with Abdur Rahman Khan installed as the ruler of Afghanistan.
- 1919 – Amanullah Khan takes the throne after the Third Anglo-Afghan War, British influence ends.
- 1973 – Mohammad Daoud Khan, Prime Minister and a member of the royal family, seizes power while King Mohammad Zahir Shah is visiting Italy.
- 1978 – Daoud Khan and his family are assassinated during the Saur Revolution, the communist People's Democratic Party of Afghanistan (PDPA) seizes power.
- 1979 – Nur Muhammad Taraki, General Secretary of PDPA, is assassinated and replaced by Hafizullah Amin. Amin is then assassinated and the Soviet Union invades. Babrak Karmal is installed as the new leader.
- 1987 – PDPA General Secretary and President Mohammad Najibullah replaces Karmal and the country begins to see some stability.
- 1989 – The Soviet army withdraws all troops from the country. The U.S. embassy is closed.
- 1992 – PDPA leader Najibullah resigns and Kabul falls to mujahideen factions. Burhanuddin Rabbani becomes leader of the new Islamic State of Afghanistan and a civil war starts.
- 1996 – Mullah Omar, founder of the Islamic Emirate of Afghanistan, is declared Supreme Leader at Kandahar and his Taliban forces begin conquering the northern parts of the country.
- 2001 – United States and coalition forces invade Afghanistan. The main purpose of the invasion is to capture or kill Osama bin Laden and all of his al-Qaeda members. In the process the Taliban regime collapses. Hamid Karzai becomes leader of the Afghan Interim Administration at the International Conference on Afghanistan in Germany.
- 2004 – Loya Jirga adopts new constitution, restructuring the government as an Islamic republic.
- 2004 – Hamid Karzai is elected President of Afghanistan.
- 2014 – Ashraf Ghani is elected President of Afghanistan, Abdullah Abdullah becomes the country's Chief Executive Officer (CEO).
- 2021 – President Ghani escapes to the UAE after Taliban fighters reach Kabul. Hibatullah Akhundzada becomes Supreme Leader of Afghanistan.

== Constitution ==
Afghanistan currently functions without a clear constitution or any basis for the rule of law. The government is self-described as "interim", as it was during the first Taliban government from 1996–2001. Taliban leadership rules by decree; judges and Taliban fighters decide how to apply the law on the spot based on their interpretation of Sharia. However, some guidelines have been put forth and there is a history of constitutional discourse within the Taliban that provides insight into their current governance.

The Taliban has historically viewed the Quran as its constitution. An ulema (scholars) council drafted a dastur (basic law), which was approved by the Supreme Court in 1998 and re-authorized for the insurgency in July 2005 in response to the promulgation of the 2004 Constitution of the Islamic Republic. The dastur is vague; it named Mullah Omar Supreme Leader and places the highest authority in that position but does not outline a selection process or the constraints of the office. Regarding the so-called supreme leader, it only states that the supreme leader must be a male Sunni Muslim and an adherent of the Hanafi school of Islamic jurisprudence. The dastur also establishes a unicameral shura council as the highest legislative body, with all members appointed by the supreme leader, and allows for a Council of Ministers, headed by a Chairman, whose role is to implement policy. Following the Taliban's return to power, the group announced the enactment of parts of the 1964 monarchy constitution that are "not in conflict with Sharia" to govern the country in the interim. Observers have noted that the dastur is being followed, though there are few conflicts between it and the 1964 Constitution, which granted immense powers to the King. In August 2022, Parwan Governor Obaidullah Aminzada stated that Supreme Leader Hibatullah Akhundzada had declared the 2004 Constitution abolished and ordered the government not to use the 1964 Constitution as a replacement, ruling neither is compatible with Sharia.

=== Taliban views on a new constitution ===
Influential Taliban interviewees, including members of the Political Commission, have suggested that the dastur was never intended to be a permanent constitution, but rather a document outlining the Taliban's vision for a transitional state. Around 2010 the dastur appeared to fade from Taliban discourse, and interviewees in the Political Commission suggested there would be room for drafting a new political framework post-U.S. withdrawal. They have consistently stated that a new constitution would be drafted only through an open consultative process rather than being imposed on the country unilaterally. However, they have invariably stated it would outline an Islamic state and the constituent assembly would in large part be made up of ulema knowledgeable in Sharia law. Some interviewees stated the 2004 Constitution was sufficiently Islamic, and that the Islamic Republic suffered political—rather than religious— illegitimacy, due to the influence of foreign powers. Therefore, they left the door open to a constitution substantially similar to the 2004 Constitution.

An exploratory committee on the drafting of a constitution was formed in early 2022, however, no updates have since been given. In September 2022, Acting Deputy Minister of Justice Maulvi Abdul Karim stated that the Quran essentially functions as the constitution and all issues can be handled through the application of Hanafi law without a written constitution. However, he added that the ministry would prepare a constitution based on the Quran and Hanafi law if the supreme leader directs it.

== Institutions ==
=== Supreme Leader ===
Hibatullah Akhundzada is the supreme leader of Afghanistan, having authority on all political, military, and religious decisions, and government appointments. As supreme leader, much of his work is done alongside the Rahbari Shura (Leadership Council) which oversees the Cabinet and Prime Minister of Afghanistan. The Rahbari Shura in conjunction with Akhundzada appoints individuals to key positions within the cabinet; which includes the positions of Prime Minister, Deputy Prime Minister, Minister of Foreign Affairs, and Minister of the Interior.

Currently, the supreme leader is also responsible for determining the overall aims of the Cabinet of Afghanistan, serving as a point of unity and leadership among the various factions of the Taliban. Because of Hibatullah Akhundzada's credentials as Mawlawi and knowledge of Fiqh, he is broadly respected among the Taliban and thus seen as a unifying figure.

=== Leadership Council ===
The Rahbari Shura (Leadership Council) is a 26-member council assisting the supreme leader with the governance of Afghanistan. According to now-Deputy Minister of Information and government spokesperson; Zabiullah Mujahid, the Rahbari Shura will oversee the Council of Ministers and determine key governmental decisions. The council was also responsible for appointing a new supreme leader after the death of their predecessor, however, it is not yet known if the council will exercise this power after the Fall of Kabul in 2021.

This setup is reminiscent of how the Islamic Emirate of Afghanistan was governed from 1996 to 2001 with Mohammad Omar being Head of the Supreme Council. However, the system has also been compared to the Supreme Leader of Iran and its clerical system of rule. The council itself was also the executive body of the Taliban during the War in Afghanistan, determining the overall direction of the group as an insurgency.

According to an Al Jazeera report, the Council of Ministers is powerless in practice, with all political power actually being vested with Akhundzada and the Rahbari Shura, which is based out of Kandahar.

=== Cabinet ===
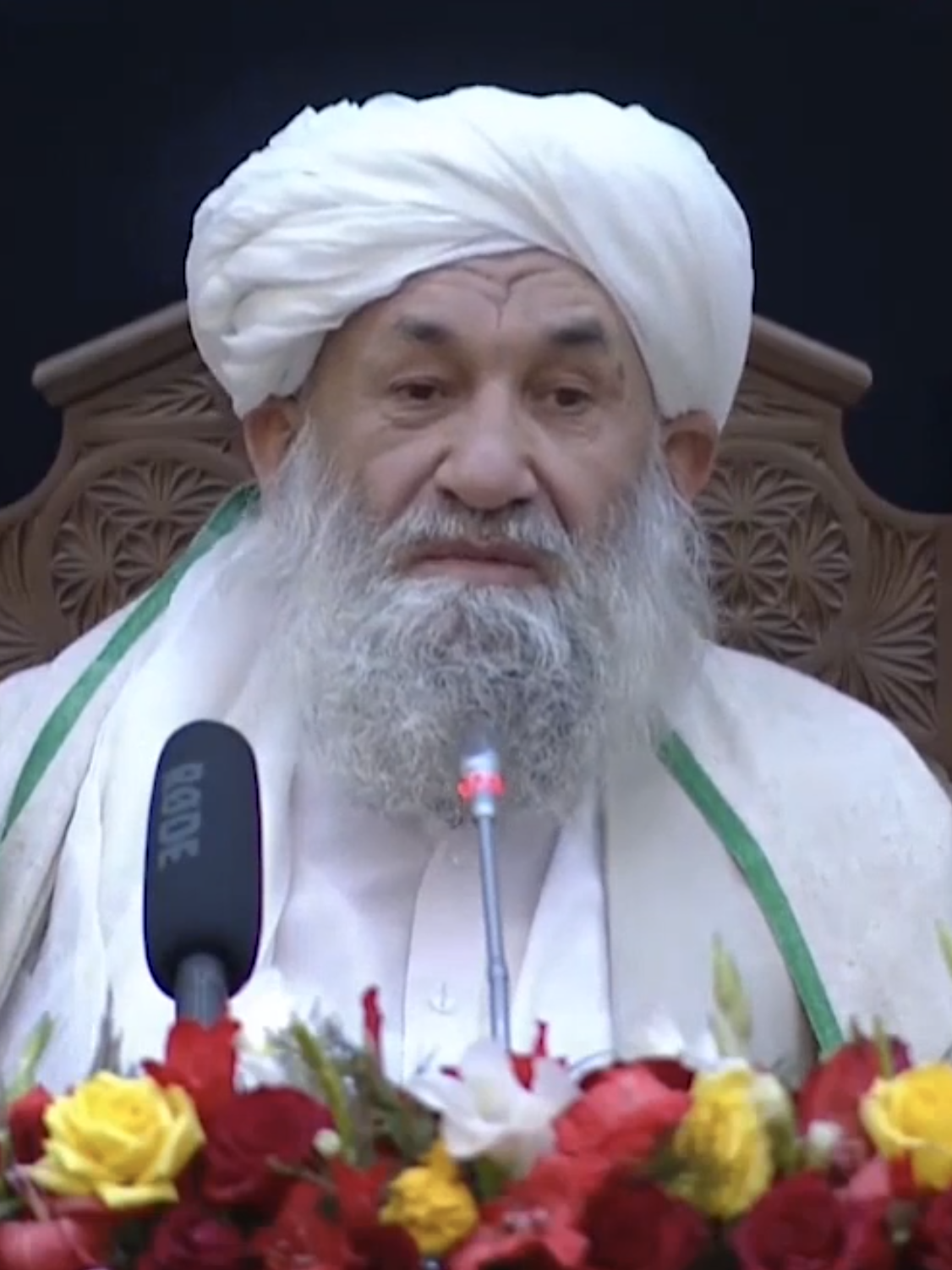
Prime Minister Hasan Akhund

The current caretaker cabinet was presented in an announcement on 7 September 2021. The country as a whole is headed by Hibatullah Akhundzada, who became head of the Taliban in 2016. The Prime Minister, Mohammad Hassan Akhund, was selected as a compromise candidate between moderate and hardline factions of the Taliban. There are two Deputy Prime Ministers, Abdul Ghani Baradar and Abdul Salam Hanafi.

In total, the cabinet (not including Hibatulla Akhundzada) included 33 ministers. All of the ministers named were men. Two ministers were Tajik, and one (Abdul Salam Hanafi) was Uzbek. All other ministers, as well as Hibatullah Akhundzada, are from the Pashtun ethnic group. As the country's largest ethnicity, Pashtuns have long dominated both the Taliban and non-Taliban politics. Some members of the government served as ministers during the previous period of Taliban rule which lasted from 1996 to 2001.

The government was announced by the Taliban's chief spokesman, Zabihullah Mujahid, who stated that this cabinet was not complete, with further appointments intended to be made. While the Taliban had previously stated that they wanted to form an inclusive government, all ministers were long-standing members of the Taliban.

On 21 September 2021, Mujahid announced the expansion of the Taliban's interim cabinet by naming deputy ministers. Mujdahid defended the all-male additional members, saying it included members of ethnic minorities, such as the Hazaras, and women might be added later. The appointment included figures from Panjshir and Baghlan.

== Policies ==
The full name of the state is the Islamic Emirate of Afghanistan. As an Islamic state, Taliban policy is to implement Sharia law.

Unapproved protests were banned on 9 September 2021 following large-scale women-led protests. The policies regarding women include a ban on participation in sports.

=== Education ===
In September 2021, the government ordered primary schools to reopen for both sexes and announced plans to reopen secondary schools for male students, without committing to do the same for female students. While the Taliban states that female college students will be able to resume higher education provided that they are segregated from male students (and professors, when possible), The Guardian notes that "if the high schools do not reopen for girls, the commitments to allow university education would become meaningless once the current cohort of students graduated." Higher Education Minister Abdul Baqi Haqqani said that female university students will be required to observe proper hijab, but did not specify if this required covering the face.

Kabul University reopened in February 2022, with female students attending in the morning and males in the afternoon. Other than the closure of the music department, few changes to the curriculum were reported. Female students were officially required to wear an abaya and a hijab to attend, although some wore a shawl instead. Attendance was reportedly low on the first day.

In March 2022, the Taliban abruptly reversed plans to allow girls to resume secondary school education (defined as grade seven and up in Afghanistan). Except for the current cohort of university students, this decision leaves graduating from sixth grade as the highest level of educational attainment possible for Afghan women. Secondary schools for boys reopened on schedule. A statement from the ministry of education cited the lack of an acceptable school uniform for female high school students.

=== Recognition and relations ===
Afghanistan's envoy to the United Nations has requested that the international community not recognise the new government. The Taliban seeks such recognition, and it has not yet received this, other governments are engaging with it to an extent.

== Factionalism ==
Since coming to power, there have been reports of factionalism and infighting among various camps of the Taliban concerning areas such as spoils of war, contributions to the Taliban insurgency, and political appointments in the new government. Factions involved include both political moderates, religious fundamentalists, jihadists, and the Haqqani network.

== See also ==
- Samoon Jirga
