= First Karzai cabinet =

Cabinet of Hamid Karzai

- Date formed: 7 December 2004
- Date dissolved: 19 November 2009

People and organisations
- Head of state: Hamid Karzai
- Head of government: Hamid Karzai
- No. of ministers: 27
- Total no. of members: 27

History
- Predecessor: Afghan Transitional Administration
- Successor: Second Karzai cabinet

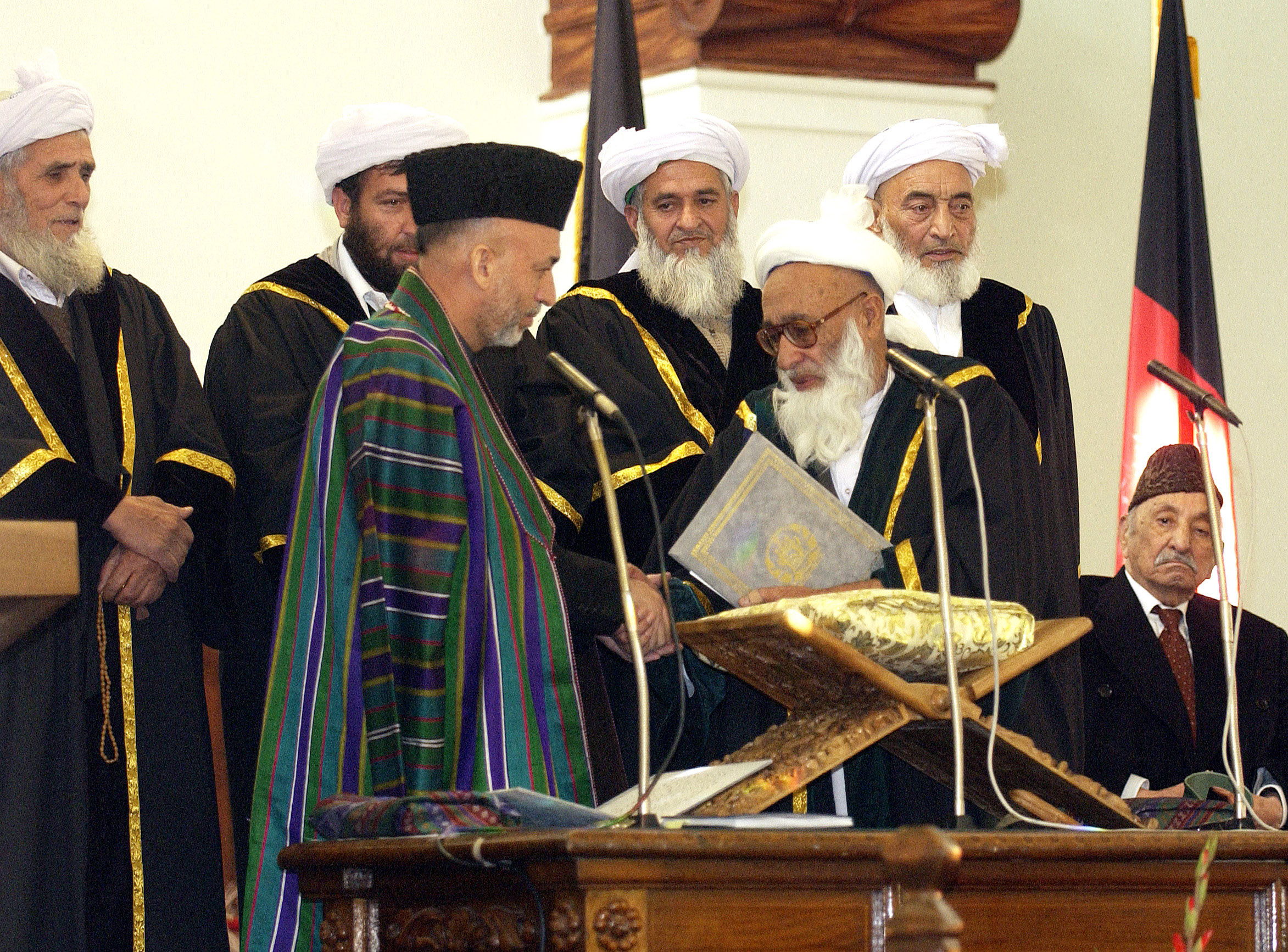
Afghanistan President Karzai (left), congratulated by Supreme Court Chief Justice Shinwari (right) after he was administered the oath of office during the Presidential Inauguration at Salaam Khana in Kabul, Afghanistan, on Dec. 7, 2004.

The First Karzai cabinet lead the administration of Afghanistan between 2004, the year Hamid Karzai won the first Afghan presidential election and 2009 when the second presidential election took place. In 2006 there was a major cabinet reshuffle. The first Karzai cabinet followed the Afghan Transitional Administration which was put in place by the 2002 loya jirga. Karzai announced the names of the cabinet on 23 December 2004. The cabinet was sworn in on 24 December 2002 and held its first cabinet meeting on 27 December. This cabinet consisted of 27 ministers, including two women.

== Initial cabinet (2004−2006) ==
=== More technocrats, fewer warlords ===
While composing the transitional administration, Karzai had to balance between different powerful groups who all wanted to be represented in the government. After Karzai was chosen by the people he was able to form a more independent government. Warlords like Gul Agha Sherzai, Yunus Qanuni and Sayed Hussain Anwari didn't return to the cabinet and were replaced by technocrats with work experience relevant to their assigned portfolios. However, prominent warlord Ismail Khan, who had been represented in earlier cabinets by his son Mir Wais Saddiq was named Water and Energy Minister

Defense Minister Muhammad Fahim was replaced by his deputy Abdur Rahim Wardak, a Pashtun leader who fought the Soviet occupation during the 1980s. The key post of finance minister will also be changed hands. Current Central Bank Governor Anwar ul-Haq Ahadi will replace current Finance Minister Ashraf Ghani, who refused to take a second term, finding the Karzai government corrupt. Ghani alienated many of his colleagues, but was popular by western allies of Afghanistan and became chief of Kabul University. Other ministers who were popular by western allies, Foreign Minister Abdullah Abdullah and Interior Minister Ali Ahmad Jalali, kept their posts in the new Cabinet. Karzai chose Massouda Jalal, his only female opponent in the 9 October presidential election and an outspoken critic of Karzai's reliance on warlords, to serve as minister of women's affairs. He also created a new Counternarcotics Ministry to confront Afghanistan's burgeoning opium industry and appointed the relatively unknown Habibullah Qadari to its helm.

The constitution of Afghanistan requires the Afghan Parliament to approve or disapprove the cabinet ministers which the Afghan President proposes. Because there was no Afghan Parliament when the administration was installed it was scheduled to be approved after the parliamentary election of 2005.

=== Composition ===
The first Karzai cabinet is, as the constitution requires, headed by a president and two vice-presidents, two less than the four vice-presidents of the Transitional Administration. Furthermore, the positions of Planning Minister, Reconstruction Minister, Civil Aviation & Tourism and Irrigation & Environment Minister were deleted. The position of minister of mines and light industries minister were merged to the post of mines and industries minister. Also three ministerial position were added, a minister for Youth, an Economic minister and a minister for counternarcotics, to fight the drug trade, making the total number of ministers from 29 to 27.

In September 2005 Interior Minister Ali Ahmad Jalali resigned. On 28 September Karzai appointed his deputy, Ahmad Moqbel Zarar as acting minister.

Ministers First Karzai Cabinet
Portfolio	Name	Previous	Studies
President	Hamid Karzai	President	Dr. of Literature Himachal Pradesh Univ
First Vice-President	Ahmad Zia Masood	Ambassador to the Russian Federation	3 years study at the Polytechnical University of Kabul
Foreign Minister	Abdullah Abdullah	Foreign Minister	Dr. Optometry Kabul University
Finance Minister	Anwar ul-Haq Ahadi	Governor Afghan Central Bank	Dr. Economics Providence University, PhD Political Science
Interior Minister	Ali Ahmad Jalali; Ahmad Moqbel Zarar	Interior Minister; Deputy Minister	Afghan Army; 3 years studies of Civil Engineering Faculty of Poly Technique University of Kabul
Communications Minister	Amirzai Sangeen	CEO of Afghan Telecom	Electronic Engineer South London Univ.
Borders Minister	Mohammed Karim Brahoye	Governor of Nimroz	Weapon Specialist Afghan Army
Refugees Minister	Azam Dadfar	Member Afghan Human Rights Commission	Dr. Medicine Kabul university
Mines and Industries Minister	Mir Mohammad Sediq	Engineer	PhD in engineering
Health Minister	Sayed Mohammad Amin Fatemi	Former member of the executive board of the WHO	Dr. Medicine Boston University US
Commerce Minister	Hedayat Amin Arsala	Vice-President	PhD Economics American University
Agriculture Minister	Obaidullah Ramin	Director in Promoting Bank	CBS Agriculture Kabul University
Justice Minister	Sarwar Danish	Governor of Daykundi	Theology (Islamic Sharia) Tehran University
Information and Culture Minister	Sayed Makhdum Rahin	Information and Culture Minister	Dr. Dari Tehran University
Haj and Islamic Affair Minister	Nematullah Shahrani	Vice-President	Master Theogoly AlHazr Univ. Egypt
Urban Development Minister	Yusuf Pashtun	Urban Development Minister	BS. Engineering
Public Works Minister	Suhrab Ali Safari	German Citizen, Resident of the US	Dr. Engineering and construction Poland University
Martyrs and Disabled Minister	Sediqa Balkhi	One of the three female participants of the Bonn Conference	BS. Humanities Balkh University
Higher Education Minister	Amir Shah Hasanyar	Member of Educational Council of Kabul University	Dr. Agriculture Colorado State Univ.
Transportation Minister	Sayed Mohammad Ali Jawid	Minister of Planning under President Rabbani	PhD in Religious Studies from Najaf, Iraq
Rural Development Minister	Mohammad Hanif Atmar	Rural Development Minister	Masters Intn't Studies York Univ. UK
Labor and Social Affairs Minister	Sayed Ekramuddin Agha	Governor of Badakhshan	BS Science Kabul University
Woman's Affairs Minister	Masooda Jalal	Presidential Candidate	Dr. Medicine Kabul University
Counternarcotics Minister	Habibullah Qaderi	Senior advisor to the Ministry of Refugees and Repatriation	BS. Engineering New Delhi India
Defense Minister	Abdul Rahim Wardak	Deputy Defense Minister	Ground Force U.S. Army
Economic Minister	Mohammad Amin Farhang	Reconstruction Minister	Dr. Economics Koln University Ger
Education Minister	Noor Mohammad Qarqeen	Social Affairs Minister and Director Presidential Campaign Karzai	BS. Politics Kabul University
Youth Affairs Minister	Amina Afzali	Member of the Afghanistan Independent Human Rights Commission	BS. Science Kabul University
Water and Energy Minister	Ismail Khan	Former Governor of Herat	General Afghan Army
Chair of the Human Rights Commission	Sima Samar	Former Woman's Affairs Minister	degree in medicine in February 1982 from Kabul University
Supreme Court Chief Justice	Faisal Ahmad Shinwari	Chief Justice	Islamic Studies, Kabul
National Security Adviser	Zalmay Rassoul	National Security Adviser	Doctorate in Medical in Paris, France.
Governor of the Afghan Central Bank	Noorullah Delwari	Senior Advisor to the Minister of Finance	B.S. Business/Economics from University of California
Afghan Permanent Representative to the UN	Ravan A.G. Farhadi	Permanent Representative to the UN	PhD at the Sorbonne, in Indo-Iranian Studies

== Approved cabinet (2006−2008) ==
=== Reshuffle ===
After the election of the Afghan Parliament in 2005 the cabinet picked by Karzai had to be approved, as is required by the Afghan Constitution. At the time the cabinet started in 2004 there was no parliament in session, so the parliamentary approval could only take place after the 2005 elections. Karzai took this opportunity to make some changes in the composition of his cabinet. Some cabinet members got another portfolio, other cabinet members were replaced by new ministers. The most notable change was the replacement of Foreign Minister Abdullah Abdullah by Rangeen Dadfar Spanta. Abdullah was offered several lesser posts but refused them. With the resignation of Abdullah Abdullah, the last of the powerful trio of the Shura-e Nazar faction, consisting of Abdullah Abdullah, Yunus Qanuni and Mohammad Fahim left the government, making Ismail Khan the only warlord left in the cabinet.

Apart from changes in the composition also minor changes in the portfolios of the ministers were made. Karzai created a new position of 'Senior Minister' for former vice-president Amin Arsala and merged the ministers of information and culture and Youth Affairs to a new minister of Youth and Culture. The Ministry of Disabled and Martyrs was merged with the Ministry of Social Affairs. The new Mines minister lost the portfolio of industries, instead Arsala's successor now became minister of commerce and industries.

On 22 March 2006 Karzai announced the following changes would be made in the cabinet he would send to the Wolesi Jirga for approval.

22 March 2006 announced cabinet changes
Position	Former Minister	New Minister	Former Position
Senior Minister		Hedayat Amin Arsala	Commerce Minister
Foreign Minister	Abdullah Abdullah	Rangeen Dadfar Spanta	Presidential Advisor on International Affairs
Interior Minister	Ahmad Moqbel Zarar (Acting Minister)	Ahmad Moqbel Zarar	Acting Interior Minister
Education Minister	Noor Mohammad Qarqeen	Mohammad Hanif Atmar	Rural Development Minister
Higher Education Minister	Amir Shah Hasanyar	Mohammad Azam Dadfar	Refugees Minister
Youth Affairs Minister	Amina Afzali	Sayed Makhdoum Raheem as Minister of Youth and Culture	
Mines Minister	Mir Mohammad Sediq	Ibrahim Adel	Deputy Minister of Mines
Commerce and Industry Minister	Hedayat Amin Arsala	Mohammad Haidar Reza	Deputy Minister of Foreign Affairs for Administration
Rehabilitation and Rural Development Minister	Mohammad Hanif Atmar	Mohammed Ehsan Zia	Deputy Rural Rehabilitation and Development Minister of Programs
Martyrs and Disabled Minister; Labor and Social Affairs Minister	Sediqa Balkhi; Sayed Ekramuddin Agha	Noor Mohammad Qarqin	Education Minister
Transportation Minister	Enayatullah Qasemi	Gul Hussein Ahmadi	Afghan Consul General in Mumbai
Woman's Affairs Minister	Masooda Jalal	Soraya Rahim Sobhrang	Advisor for the women's rights protection and development unit of Afghanistan Independent Human Rights Commission
Refugees Minister	Azam Dadfar	Ustad Akbar Akbar	Akbar was a refugee in Pakistan and his family still lives there.

=== Rejection of five minister by Parliament ===
In order to expedite the approval of the Cabinet, the Wolesi Jirga has decided to have each Minister deliver a 20-minute speech to the entire house, then answer one question from each of the 18 committees in the Wolesi Jirga. The Wolesi Jirga will vote to confirm each Minister individually by secret ballot.

After voting on the candidates in April 2006, 20 out of the 25 ministers were approved by the Wolesi Jirga. The approvals on Thursday came after strong lobbying by members of the presidential staff and the ministers themselves and an appeal from the chairman of Parliament, Muhammad Yunus Qanooni, to place the national interest above ethnic and personal divisions.

The five rejected minister were Muhammad Amin Farhang, Sayed Makhdum Raheen, Soraya Rahim Sobhrang, Gul Hussein Ahmadi and Muhammad Haidar Reza. Especially the rejection of close Karzai ally Muhammad Amin Farhang was a blow for the president. Legislators said after the vote that his rejection was largely based on what they said was his poor performance as minister of reconstruction for three years and as minister of economy for the past year. The rejection of Raheen and Rabarnag were indications of the strong conservative Islamic element in the Parliament. According to analysts many legislators regard themselves as part of a united front to guard and interpret Afghanistan's Islamic identity. Raheen was widely criticized in his hearing for allowing films and videos that were considered offensive to strict Muslims to be broadcast on cable and national channels. Sobhrang was the only female candidate and did not find favor with conservative religious members of Parliament. Rumors circulated about her political background, and she did little campaigning or entertaining of legislators, as other ministers had done. The rejection of Ahmadi and Reza was due to poor performances in the hearings, the New York Times reported.

The approval procedure of parliament was mainly seen by analyst as a success for President Karzai, having been able to get 20 of his 25 minister approved, including the 4 key ministers of Foreign Affairs, Defense, Interior and Finance. The 20 ministers were sworn in by Karzai on 3 May 2006.

=== Approval of five new ministers ===
In August 2006 Karzai named 5 ministers who were to replace the rejected ministers in his cabinet. All five ministers were subsequently approved by the Wolesi Jirga The five new minister were.

8 August 2006 additional approved ministers
Position	Former Minister	New Minister	Former Position
Economic and Labor Minister	Mohammad Amin Farhang	Mohammad Jalil Shams	Deputy Minister of Energy and Water
Woman's Affairs Minister	Masooda Jalal	Hosn Banu Ghazanfar	Head of the Literature Faculty
Commerce Minister	Hedayat Amin Arsala	Mohammad Amin Farhang	Minister Economic Affairs
Transportation and Aviation Minister	Enayatullah Qasemi	Nimatullah Ehsan Jawed	
Culture and Youth Affairs Minister	Sayed Makhdum Raheen	Abdul Karim Khoram	

=== 2008 Replacements ===
In March 2008, Karzai replaced the minister of counternarcotics by his deputy, General Khodaidad.

Half a year later, Karzai sacked his interior minister Zarar Ahmed Moqbel. Moqbel was widely accused of corruption and incompetence, and i.a. Britain had lobbied for his sacking. He was replaced by Education Minister Mohammad Hanif Atmar. Atmar was appointed by president Karzai on 11 October 2008, and approved by Parliament on 20 October 2008. The same day the Afghan Parliament approved the appointment of Ghulam Farooq Wardak to the old portfolio of Atmar. Wardak was previously as minister of Parliamentary Affairs the liaison between the Afghan legislature and the executive. Also Muhammad Asif Rahimi was named as new minister of Agriculture.

At the same time, Karzai appointed Zarar Ahmad Muqbal as new Minister of Refugees and Repatriation, and named Assadullah Khalid as Wardak's successor as ministry of Parliamentary Affairs. However, both rejected their positions. Therefore, as few days later Karzai decided to name the incumbent minister of Border and Tribal Affairs, Abdul Karim Barahwy as minister of Refugees made Assadullah Khalid his successor.

In late 2008 Karzai replaced his Commerce minister, naming deputy Finance Minister Wahidullah Shahrani for the post. Karzai also replaced the minister of transport around this time. In a 10 November 2008 cabinet meeting, President Karzai abruptly dismissed Minister of Transport and Civil Aviation Hamidullah Qaderi on the charge that Qaderi had mishandled preparations for 2008 Hajj travel. Hajj flights from Afghan cities were to begin 8 November. However, the Saudi- Malaysian joint venture NAS/Global charter airline with which Minister Qaderi contracted for flights said it could not provide planes to transport Afghan pilgrims to Saudi Arabia, perhaps because of a late Afghan contract payment. President Karzai has asked the Attorney General to investigate Qaderi for corruption and appointed his chief economic advisor Omar Zakhilwal as acting Minister of Transport and Civil Aviation and head of the Hajj committee.

After Finance Minister Anwar AlHaq Ahadi resigned his post in 2009 to make a run for the next presidential elections, Karzai named Zakhilwal as the new minister of Finance, and made Hamidullah Faruqi the new minister of Transport. Zakhilwal was named as the new finance minister on 7 February 2009 and was approved by the Parliament on 3 March 2009.

Additional Replacements
Position	Former Minister	New Minister	Former Position
Counternarcotics Ministry	Habibullah Qaderi	General Khodaydad	Deputy Minister of Counternarcotics
Refugees Minister	Azam Dadfar	Abdul Karim Barahawi	Minister of Border Affairs and Tribal Affairs
Interior Minister	Zarar Ahmad Moqbal	Mohammad Hanif Atmar	Minister of Education
Education Minister	Mohammad Hanif Atmar	Ghulam Farooq Wardak	Parliamentary Affairs Minister
Agriculture Minister	Obaidullah Ramin	Mohammad Asef Rahimi	Deputy Minister for Programs at the Ministry of Rural Rehabilitation and Development
Borders Minister	Abdul Karim Brahui	Asadullah Khalid	Governor of Kandahar
Commerce Minister	Mohammad Haidar Reza	Wahidullah Shahrani	Deputy Minister for Finance
Transportation Minister	Hamidullah Qaderi	Hamidullah Faruqi	Professors and Lecturer Faculty of Economics, Kabul University
Finance Minister	Anwar ul-Haq Ahadi	Omar Zakhilwal	Acting Minister of Transportation (November 2008) and as President & CEO of Afghanistan Investment Support Agency (AISA)

Preceded by Afghan Transitional Administration	First Karzai cabinet 2004–2009	Succeeded by Second Karzai cabinet
