= Transitional Islamic State of Afghanistan =

2002–2004 administration in Afghanistan

Afghan Transitional Administration
- Date formed: 19 June 2002
- Date dissolved: 7 December 2004

People and organisations
- Head of state: Hamid Karzai
- Head of government: Hamid Karzai
- No. of ministers: 28
- Total no. of members: 28

History
- Predecessor: Afghan Interim Administration
- Successor: Cabinet: First Karzai cabinet Country: Islamic Republic of Afghanistan

The Transitional Islamic State of Afghanistan (TISA), also known as the Afghan Transitional Authority, was the temporary transitional government in Afghanistan established by the loya jirga in June 2002. The Transitional Authority succeeded the original Islamic State of Afghanistan and preceded the Islamic Republic of Afghanistan.

== Background ==
Following the 2001 invasion of Afghanistan, a United Nations-sponsored conference of Afghan political figures in Bonn, Germany, led to the creation of the Afghan Interim Administration under the chairmanship of Hamid Karzai. However, this Interim Administration, which was not broadly representative, was scheduled to last only six months before being replaced by a Transitional Administration. The move to this second stage would require the convening of a traditional Afghan "grand assembly", called a Loya Jirga. This Emergency Loya Jirga would elect a new Head of State and appoint the Transitional Administration, which, in turn, would run the country for a maximum of two more years until a "fully representative government" could be elected through free and fair elections.

== History ==
=== Electing a head of state ===
The most important task for the Loya Jirga was to choose a president for the Transitional Administration who would lead the country until official presidential elections could be held in 2004. Initially, two candidates who had declared to run: former president of Afghanistan and Northern Alliance leader Burhanuddin Rabbani, and the American-backed chairman of the Afghan Interim Administration Hamid Karzai. Karzai was also supported by Abdullah Abdullah and Mohammad Fahim, two important leaders of the Northern Alliance. A third possible candidate was Zahir Shah, former king of Afghanistan until 1973. He had spent years living in Rome but returned to Afghanistan after the fall of the Taliban regime. Already at the Bonn Conference, which installed the interim administration there was a group of supporters of Zahir Shah, called the Rome-group, advocated for the former king to take up the position of head of state.

Upon arrival in Kabul, more than 800 delegates signed a petition urging the nomination of Zahir Shah as Head of State, if only as a figurehead. In view of the speculation aroused by the petition, United States and United Nations representatives pressed the former king to withdraw. The start of the Loya Jirga was delayed from 10 to 11 June because of "logistical and preparatory problems." On June 10, the American representative Zalmay Khalilzad gave a press conference in which he declared that Zahir Shah was not a candidate. The same day, in a press conference, Zahir Shah confirmed this and said "I have no intention of restoring the monarchy. I am not a candidate for any position in the Loya Jirga." Hamid Karzai, who sat next to Zahir Shah at the press conference called Zahir Shah the "father of the nation" and thanked him for the "confidence His Majesty has put in me." The next day former President Burhanuddin Rabbani withdrew his candidacy for Head of State in favour of Hamid Karzai "for the sake of national unity"

So it looked like Karzai would go into the race for head of government uncontested, but two other candidates emerged. To be on the ballot at the Loya Jirga, a candidate had to submit 150 signatures for his candidacy. Glam Fareq Majidi gathered only 101 signatures, so he was disqualified as a candidate. Former mujahedeen fighter Mohammed Asef Mohsoni submitted a list with 1,050 names for Karzai. And also Masooda Jalal, a woman doctor working with the World Food Programme, and Mahfoz Nadai, an Uzbek army officer, poet, and deputy government minister, gathered enough signatures to be on the ballot.

The election for president of the transitional administration was held by secret ballot on June 13, 2002, with black-and-white photos of the candidates adjacent to their names. Hamid Karzai was chosen with an overwhelming majority of 83% and remained in office as President.

Elections for President of Transitional Administration, by the 2002 Loya Jirga
Candidates	Votes	%
Hamid Karzai	1,295	83%
Masooda Jalal	171	11%
Mahfoz Nadai	89	6%
Total Votes	1555	100%

=== Appointing the government ministers ===
On June 18, the day Karzai was to present his cabinet to the Loya Jirga, he informed the assembly that he needed one more day to finalize his list.

On June 19, the last day of the Loya Jirga, Karzai announced the names of 14 ministers for the future Afghan transitional administration, including three Vice-Presidents. He also named a Chief Justice. "Do you accept this Cabinet?" Karzai asked the Loya Jirga. After hands went up in support, he said, "All have accepted it, and I am happy about it." This led to some controversy, as delegates stated that there had not been a proper vote and that the cabinet had not been democratically selected but was the result of political negotiations parallel to the Loya jirga.

All three vice-presidential posts named by Karzai were given to commanders of the Northern Alliance, though Karzai ensured that none of the vice-presidents came from the same ethnic background. After the Loya Jirga, there was some controversy about the government Karzai had named, and several names were added to the list before the actual cabinet was sworn in on June 24, to appease certain factions within Afghanistan. On June 22, Karzai presented more cabinet members, bringing the total number of ministers to 29. This cabinet was installed on June 24, 2002. However, due to controversy around the post of Minister of Women's Affairs, this position remained vacant. Before the end of June, Karzai named a State adviser to the Women's Affairs Ministry and later also appointed a formal Minister of Women's Affairs. In the last days of June, Karzai also added two more vice-presidents and another National Security Adviser.

=== More Pashtun representation ===
The interim government, led by a Pashtun, had 12 Tajiks and 9 Pashtuns in its cabinet of ministers. Therefore, Pashtuns wanted the subsequent transitional administration to be more representative. In the new administration, there were 13 Pashtun ministers among the 30 ministers. The rest of the cabinet comprised 7 Tajiks, 3 Uzbeks, 2 Hazaras, 2 non-Hazara Shi'ites, and 1 Turkmen.

=== Cabinet of warlords ===
The Pashtun element in the transitional administration was stronger than in the interim administration, and the Loya Jirga was meant, in part, to increase civilian influence in the government. However, in many ways, Afghanistan's military factions and warlords increased and further legitimized their power during the Loya Jirga. During and after the Loya Jirga, army and police officials threatened, imprisoned, and even killed candidates to stop them from running for the Loya Jirga or to intimidate them from acting independently. The Northern Alliance still dominated the government. The three vice-presidents Karzai announced at the Loya Jirga—Khalili, Qadir and Fahim—were all Northern Alliance commanders, although none of them had the same ethnic background. The powerful Tajik Jamiat-e Islami trio of Fahim, Qanuni, and Abdullah kept important positions in the new cabinet.

The powerful warlord Ismail Khan was not part of the administration, but he was represented by his son, Mir Wais Saddiq. However, Saddiq was assassinated in 2004 while serving as minister. Another powerful warlord, the Uzbek Abdul Rashid Dostum, was also not part of the cabinet; however, there was one more Uzbek in the transitional administration than in the interim administration.

In the years after the government was established, President Karzai made efforts to limit the worst effects of warlord dominance. For example, he replaced the relatively weak Pashtun who led the Ministry of Interior with the more reform-minded Ali Ahmad Jalali.

=== Adding royalists ===
At the Loya Jirga, Karzai named former King Zahir Shah the Father of the Nation. However, some of the king's supporters thought that an honorary title wasn't enough and would have preferred to see him in an official position as president, with Karzai as prime minister. Additionally, two of the king's loyalists, Hedayat Amin Arsala and Abdul Rassoul Amin, had lost their positions in the interim government. Because the members loyal to Zahir Shah, united in the 'Rome group,' felt they had too little influence, Karzai added Zalmay Rassoul as Security Adviser and Amin Arsala as a fifth vice-president at the end of June.

=== Western-schooled intellectuals ===
Karzai was also under pressure to include highly educated Afghans in the administration who had become refugees during the Communist or Taliban rule of Afghanistan and had been educated at Western universities. The most remarkable person Karzai appointed was Ashraf Ghani, who worked at the World Bank, as Finance Minister. Juma Mohammedi, who became Mines Minister, was also a World Bank employee. The new Interior Minister, Taj Mohammad , held American citizenship, as did Ali Ahmad Jalali, who replaced him as Interior Minister in January 2003.

=== Opposition from Yunus Qanuni ===
Because of the issue of Pashtun underrepresentation, Yunus Qanuni, one of the important Northern Alliance leaders, told the opening session he would be resigning as Minister of the interior so Karzai could strengthen the national government by broadening its ethnic mix. Yunus Qanuni, the former Interior Minister, was unhappy with the post of Education Minister he had been assigned, as he had expected to become something like a prime minister. Qanuni said he considered not joining the government at all. The rank-and-file Panjshiri troops who dominate the Interior Ministry temporarily blocked off the roads around the Interior Ministry complex in Kabul on June 20 and 21 and brandished weapons to demonstrate that their loyalties remained with Qanuni. They denied the new Interior Minister, the 80-year-old Taj Mohammad , access to the Interior Ministry After Karzai appointed Qanuni as special adviser on security, through which he retained unofficial control over the Afghan intelligence apparatus and became the de facto supervisor of , he decided to join the administration anyway. However, he also formed a party outside of the government and ran for president in the next elections.

=== Women's affairs ===
There was also controversy around the post of Minister for Women's Affairs: Interim Women's Affairs Minister Sima Samar had been very outspoken and she had received threats. Complaints against her were filed by the Supreme Court, which eventually decided not to charge her with blasphemy. Because Samar wasn't on the list at the Loya Jirga, there was initially no minister appointed for Women's Affairs. Karzai later appointed Mahbuba Huquqmal as State Representative in the Women's Affairs Ministry, and afterward, Habiba Sarabi as formal Minister of Women's Affairs.

=== The killing of Abdul Qadir ===
The Pashtun vice-president was Haji Abdul Qadeer, one of the few Northern Alliance commanders of Pashtun ethnic origin. On July 6, 2002, Qadir and his son-in-law were killed by gunmen in a surprise attack with an unknown motive. In 2004, one man was sentenced to death and two others to prison sentences for the killing.

== Composition ==
Transitional Afghan Ministers
Transitional Authority Position	Name	Ethnicity	Incumbent/New
President	Hamid Karzai	Pashtun	Incumbent (before chairman)
Vice-President and Defense Minister	Mohammed Fahim	Tajik	Incumbent
Vice-President	Karim Khalili	Hazara	New
Vice-President	Hedayat Amin Arsala	Pashtun	New (was Finance Minister)
Vice-President and Public Works Minister	Abdul Qadir; Abdul Ali	Pashtun	New (was Urban Affairs Minister) (killed on July 6, 2002); New (Ali only took over the Public Works portfolio after July 6, 2002
Vice-President and head of the Afghan Constitution Commission	Nematullah Shahrani	Uzbek	New
Special Advisor on Security and Education Minister	Yunus Qanooni	Tajik	Incumbent (Special Advisor on Security is new post)
Foreign Minister	Abdullah Abdullah	Tajik	Incumbent
Finance Minister	Ashraf Ghani	Pashtun	New
Interior Minister	Taj Mohammed; Ali Ahmad Jalali	Pashtun; Pashtun	New; New (Jalali replaced in Januari 2003)
Planning Minister	Mohammed Mohaqqeq	Hazara	Incumbent (but lost role as vice-chair)
Communications Minister	Masoom Stanakzai	Pashtun	New
Borders Minister	Arif Nurzai	Pashtun	New (was Small Industries Minister)
Refugees Minister	Intayatullah Nazeri	Tajik	Incumbent
Mines Minister	Juma Muhammad Muhammadi	Pashtun	New
Light Industries Minister	Mohammed Alim Razm	Uzbek	Incumbent
Health Minister	Sohaila Siddiqi	Pashtun	Incumbent
Commerce Minister	Sayed Mustafa Kasemi	Shiite Muslim	Incumbent
Agriculture Minister	Sayed Hussain Anwari	Hazara	Incumbent
Justice Minister	Abdul Rahim Karimi	Uzbek	Incumbent
Information and Culture Minister	Saeed Makhdoom Rahim	Tajik	Incumbent
Reconstruction Minister	Mohammed Fahim Farhang	Pashtun	Incumbent
Haj and Mosques Minister	Mohammed Amin Naziryar	Pashtun	New
Urban Affairs Minister	Yusuf Pashtun; Gul Agha Sherzai	Pashtun; Pashtun	New; New (Sherzai took over on August 16, 2003)
Water and Power Minister	Ahmed Shakar Karkar	Uzbek	Incumbent (but los role as Vice-chair)
Irrigation & Environment Minister	Ahmed Yusuf Nuristani	Pashtun	New
Martyrs and Disabled Minister	Abdullah	Pashtun	Incumbent
Higher Education Minister	Sharif Faez	Tajik	Incumbent
Civil Aviation & Tourism Minister	Mir Wais Saddiq	Tajik	New (was Labor and Social Affairs Minister)
Transportation Minister	Said Mohammad Ali Jawid	Shiite Muslim	New (previously served as Minister of Planning under President Burhanuddin Rabbani)
Rural Development Minister	Hanif Asmar	Pashtun	New
Labor and Social Affairs Minister	Noor Mohammad Qarqin	Turkmen	
Woman's Affairs Minister	Habiba Sarabi	Hazara	New
Supreme Court Chief Justice	Hadi Shinwari	Pashtun	
Security Advisor	Zalmay Rassoul	Pashtun	
State or Advisor-Minister for Women's Affairs	Mahbooba Hoquqmal	Pashtun	
Governor of the Afghan Central Bank	Anwar ul-Haq Ahadi	Pashtun	

Preceded by Afghan Interim Administration	Afghan Transitional Administration; 2002 – 2004	Succeeded by First Karzai cabinet
