= Human trafficking in Afghanistan =

Afghanistan is one of the source, transit, and destination country for men, women, and children who are subjected to trafficking in persons, specifically forced labor and forced prostitution. Trafficking within Afghanistan is more prevalent than transnational trafficking, and the majority of victims are children. In 2005 the Afghan Independent Human Rights Commission (AIHRC) reported 150 child trafficking cases to other states. Afghan boys and girls are trafficked within the country and into Iran, Pakistan and India as well as Persian gulf Arab states, where they live as slaves and are forced to prostitution and forced labor in brick kilns, carpet-making factories, and domestic service. In some cases the boys and girls were used for organ trafficking. Forced begging is a growing problem in Afghanistan; Mafia groups organize professional begging rings. Afghan boys are subjected to forced prostitution and forced labor in the drug smuggling industry in Pakistan and Iran. Afghan women and girls are subjected to forced prostitution, arranged and forced marriages—including those in which husbands force their wives into prostitution—and involuntary domestic servitude in Pakistan and Iran, and possibly India. Non-governmental organizations (NGOs) report in 2008 that over the past year, increasing numbers of boys were trafficked internally. Some families knowingly sell their children for forced prostitution, including for bacha bazi - a practice combining sexual slavery and child prostitution, through which wealthy men use harems of young boys for social and sexual entertainment. Other families send their children with brokers to gain employment. Many of these children end up in forced labor, particularly in Pakistani carpet factories. NGOs indicate that families sometimes make cost-benefit analyses regarding how much debt they can incur based on their tradable family members.

Afghan men are subjected to forced labor and debt bondage in the agriculture and construction sectors in Iran, Pakistan, Greece, the Arab states of the Persian Gulf, and possibly Southeast Asian countries. Under the pretense of high-paying employment opportunities, traffickers lure foreign workers to Afghanistan, and lure Afghan villagers to Afghan cities or to India or Pakistan, then sometimes subject them to forced labor or forced prostitution at the destination. At the end of 2009 and beginning of 2010, an increasing number of male migrants from Sri Lanka, Nepal, and India, who had migrated willingly to Afghanistan, were then subjected to forced labor.

Women and girls from Pakistan, Tajikistan, and possibly Uganda and China are forced into prostitution in Afghanistan. Some international security contractors may have been involved in the sex trafficking of these women. Brothels and prostitution rings are sometimes run by foreigners, sometimes with links to larger criminal networks. Tajik women are also believed to be trafficked through Afghanistan to other countries for prostitution. Trafficked Iranian women transit Afghanistan en route to Pakistan.

The United Nations reported that children were associated with the Afghan National Police (ANP) during the year. The government is taking measures to improve the age verification systems of the ANP. Children from ages 12 to 16 years are used as suicide bombers by the Taliban. Some children have been tricked or forced to become suicide bombers. Others are heavily indoctrinated or are not aware that they are carrying explosives, which are then set off remotely without their knowledge. Some child soldiers used by insurgent groups were sexually exploited. Boys are sometimes promised enrollment in Islamic schools in Pakistan and Iran, but instead are trafficked to camps for paramilitary training by extremist groups.

There are also women and girls markets in eastern Afghanistan, around the regions of Nangarhar and Paktia, where the females are sold openly. Locals have said that some women are sold several times and the victims are usually widows, wives of poor men or wives that are no longer loved by the husband. Some of the victims are said to be trafficked into Pakistan where they are sold for less than a mule. The Shinwar tribe is famous for this tradition.

The then Government of Afghanistan made significant efforts to combat trafficking, such as the continued referral of identified trafficking victims to care facilities. However, the government did not show evidence of increasing efforts . Specifically, the Afghan government did not prosecute or convict trafficking offenders under its 2008 law, and punished victims of sex trafficking with imprisonment for adultery or prostitution.

U.S. State Department's Office to Monitor and Combat Trafficking in Persons placed the country in "Tier 3" in 2021.

== Protection ==
The Government of Afghanistan made minimal progress in protecting victims of trafficking. Afghanistan did not have a formal procedure to identify victims of trafficking. The government continued to run two referral centers in Parwan and Jalalabad. Under a formalized referral agreement established in late 2007, Afghan police continued to refer women victimized by violence to the Ministry of Women's Affairs (MOWA), UNIFEM, IOM, and NGOs. The government lacked resources to provide victims with protective services directly; NGOs operated the country's shelters and provided the vast majority of victim assistance, but some faced hardships due to threats from the local community, particularly when assisting in cases that involved perceived “honor” crimes, such as rape.

One NGO-run shelter in Kabul is reserved specifically for trafficking victims. Some NGOs running care facilities for trafficking victims reported generally adequate coordination with government officials. The Ministry of Labor and Social Affairs, Martyrs and Disabled (MOLSAMD) provided some job training to street children and children in care facilities, and MOWA provided free legal services to victims of violence; it is unclear how many people served were victims of trafficking. There are no facilities in Afghanistan to provide shelter or specific protective services to male trafficking victims, although an NGO-run shelter for boy victims was scheduled to open in 2010. During the reporting period, some trafficked boys were placed in government-run orphanages and a facility for juvenile criminals while their cases were being investigated, while adult men are kept in detention centers during investigation. Living conditions in government-run orphanages are extremely poor and some corrupt officials may have sexually abused children and forced them into prostitution. The anti-trafficking law permits foreign victims to remain in Afghanistan for at least six months; there were no reports of foreign victims making use of this provision of immigration relief.

Serious concerns remain regarding government officials who punish victims of trafficking for acts they may have committed as a direct result of being trafficked. In some cases, trafficking victims were jailed pending resolution of their legal cases, despite their recognized victim status. Female trafficking victims continued to be arrested and imprisoned or otherwise punished for prostitution and fleeing forced marriages for trafficking purposes. Heather Barr of Humans Rights Watch´s Asia Division (HRW) reported that many women are forced into prostitution by their husbands and in-laws, because they were seen as a source of money. In some cases, women who fled their homes to escape these types of forced marriages reported being raped by police or treated by police as criminals simply for not being chaperoned. Victimized women who could not find place in a shelter often ended up in prison; some women chose to go to prison for protection from male family members. There is no evidence that the government encouraged victims to assist in investigations of their traffickers during the reporting period. Attempts to seek redress are impeded in part because an Afghan victim would be in grave danger for simply identifying his or her assailant.

== Prevention ==
During the reporting period, the Government of Afghanistan made no discernible progress in preventing human trafficking. In 2007, a new department for the fight against human trafficking was established within the Criminal Investigation Directorate as a coordinating unit. The MOWA Initiative to Strengthen Policy and Advocacy through Communications and Institution Building launched and partially funded a public information campaign with foreign donor support. The campaign consisted of billboards, radio spots, and a short radio drama series on trafficking, and targeted all 34 provinces. Monitoring reports confirmed increased awareness of trafficking issues. The ANP worked to improve its age verification procedures in order to eliminate child soldiers from its ranks. While the government issued some birth certificates and marriage certificates, many citizens in rural areas do not request or obtain these documents; fewer than ten percent of children are registered at birth. The government did not take steps to reduce the demand for commercial sex acts or forced labor during the reporting period. In December 2009, the Monitoring, Reporting and Response Steering Committee was formed to write an action plan for the government's work with UN Task Forces on Trafficking and Children in Armed Conflict; this action plan has not been completed to date. Afghanistan is not a party to the 2000 UN TIP Protocol.

In 2008, the Afghan government passed a law to combat kidnapping and human trafficking, which provides for life imprisonment for sex trafficking and 8–15 years for labor trafficking. In 2017, the Afghan president signed a new penal code that bans and punishes Baja-Bazi.

In 2018, a referral network of NGO's and media (ANCTIP) was founded to combat human trafficking and migrant smuggling in Afghanistan. The aim is to support the 2017 law against human trafficking.

== See also ==
- Slavery in Afghanistan
- Child slavery
- Commercial sexual exploitation of children
- Exploitation of labour
- Slavery
- Sexual slavery
- Hate crime
- Human rights
- Human trafficking
- War economy
- Women in Islam
- Islam and children
- War in Afghanistan (2001–2021)
