= 6th Corps (Afghanistan) =

The 6th Corps was a corps (a military formation) of the Afghan Army, seemingly active from 1990 to around 2003–2004. Created as a military formation of the PDPA's standing army, it degraded into a grouping of militias by its last years.

Abdul Rashid Dostum had previously commanded the Jozjani militia, which later became the 53rd Infantry Division. Numbering 40,000 men drawn from the Uzbek minority, it took its orders directly from Mohammad Najibullah. It was later termed as the 'only real mobile reserve' available to the regime. After 1989, this force was the only one capable of carrying out offensive operations.

The 80th Division was reportedly formed during the Soviet–Afghan War, after 1988. It was originally an Isma'ili-sponsored tribal Sarandoy (Interior Ministry) regiment/brigade. In 1989 it was the major formation in Baghlan Province, under the command of Sayed Jafar Naderi, known as Warlord of Kayan, the then 25-year-old son of Sayed Mansoor Naderi, 53, the religious leader of the minor Isma`ili Islamic sect in Afghanistan whose main base is Kayan. Inhabiting the areas along or adjacent to the main road leading north from the Salang Tunnel, the cooperation of the Isma'ilis became indispensable to the PDPA regime so as to guarantee the security of convoys moving southwards to Kabul.

The corps was reportedly formed in 1990. General Khodaidad reportedly became chief of staff of the corps and commander of the 54th Division that year. On 18 April 1992, Kunduz, the corps headquarters, was surrendered to the Mujahideen. The corps consisted at the time of the 20th Division, 54th Division, and 80th Division (Kiligai?), and the city hosted the corps headquarters and the 54th Division headquarters. The divisional commander of 54th Division, an ethnic Pashtun, handed over the divisional base complete to the Ittehad-e-Islami leader in the Kunduz area, commander Amir Chughay. Most of the units of the corps came under the sway of Abdul Rashid Dostum's Juneshi-i-Mili Islami, or National Islamic Movement of Afghanistan.

Junbesh-i-Islami soon had a force of five divisions (the corps' three plus the 19th and 53rd Division) several independent brigades (including the 510th and 511th) and militia formations, plus police and armed units belonging to the national security (WAD). The force was theoretically 120,000 men strong, equipped with large amounts of armour and artillery, spread across seven of Afghanistan's provinces, from Maimana, to Sheberghan, home of the 53rd Division, to Pul-i-Khumri in the east. The actual total of full-time troops probably stood at around half that number.

By mid-1994 there were two parallel 6th Corps operating in the north. Dostum's 6th Corps was based at Pul-i-Khumri and had three divisions: the 20th Division (Bagh-i-Momtaz, south of Baghlan), the 54th Division (Samangan), and the 80th Division (Qilagai/Kiligai), controlled by the Naderi clan that presides over the Ismaeli. The Defence Ministry of the Kabul government's 6th Corps was based at Kunduz and also had three divisions, two sharing numbers with formations in Dostum's corps. Davis in JIR 1994 lists the 20th, 54th, 55th and Bakakhstan Divisions.

The 29th AMF Division was reported as responsible for the nine eastern districts of Badakhshan and was a part of Dostum's 6th Corps in Kunduz.

Brigadier General Mohammed Daoud Andrabi Khan became corps commander and was reportedly the most powerful man in Kunduz province. Daoud was a former deputy to Masoud, is Tajik, and was a member of Jamiat-i-Islami.

An arms collection effort was initiated in late November and early December 2001 by General Atiqullah Bariyalai, who briefly headed the 6th Army Corps before becoming deputy defence minister in 2002. The International Crisis Group describes this effort as 'coordinated and partially successful,' implemented by 'a commission composed of the deputies of the corps commander, division chiefs, police chiefs, and governors in all four northeastern provinces'.

Daoud was made deputy interior minister of narcotics affairs on August 16, 2004.

One report has the corps disbanding in 2003.

== See also ==
- Civil war in Afghanistan (1992–1996)
