= Ismael Balkhi =

Afghan Ayatollah (1918-1968)

Allama Sayed Isma'el Balkhi علامه سید اسماعیل بلخی
- Allama Balkhi
- Born: Sayed Ismael; 1918; Balkhab, Sar-e Pol Province, Emirate of Afghanistan
- Died: 14 July 1968 (aged 49–50); Kabul, Kingdom of Afghanistan
- Burial place: Kabul
- Occupations: Writer, poet, intellectual, politician
- Political party: حذب ارشاد Guidance Party

Sayed Isma'el Balkhi (Dari: سید اسماعیل بلخی) (1918 –14 July 1968) was one of the most prominent reformist leaders in 20th-century Afghanistan. As a poet, mystic and a political leader, Balkhi is considered the figurehead of modern Afghan history.

== Life ==
=== Early life ===
Sayed Ismael Balkhi was born in 1918 in Balkhab district, Sar-e Pol province in Northern Afghanistan, into a local Husaynid Sayyid family. He received early education in Afghanistan after which he traveled to Iraq for further studies in Islamic theology and jurisprudence. At the time when Balkhi left the country, the Afghan government did not have standards of higher education that other Muslim countries had. Balkhi was a Shia by religion and thus associated with the greater Hazara community. Balkhi was introduced to reformist movements popular at that time in the Middle East. He imported these intellectual enhancements back to his home region in Afghanistan and became a preacher.

=== Career ===
A religious activist, Balkhi was concerned during the liberal late 1940s period in Afghanistan, eventually becoming a political radical. In 1949, Balkhi plotted with at least five associates a coup d'etat against King Mohammad Zahir Shah (or, more specifically, an assassination attempt on Prime Minister Shah Mahmud Khan). The plan was foiled, and Balkhi spent some years in prison under the charges of conspiring to overthrow the monarchy and establish a republic. The dynamism of Balkhi's personality is that he got his education in an environment (i.e. Iraq) where clerics were either turned into radical revolutionaries like Ruhollah Khomeini and Ali Khamenei or into self-absorbed mystics or study-oriented scholars. He was an exception among all such individuals. Ismael Balkhi was a mystic; he was heavily influenced by Mawlana Jalaluddin Balkhi but in the meantime, he was not unaware of his society. Similarly, Balkhi believed in political change but he never embraced any terrorist ideology or even internationalist approach. He wrote several nationalistic poems whilst in prison.

=== Family ===
His daughter, Sediqa Balkhi, was a minister in Hamid Karzais post-Taliban government from 2004 to 2009.

== See also ==
- List of Hazara people
