= Hasina Jalal =

Afghan activist

- حسینه جلال
- Born: Kabul, Afghanistan
- Occupation: Human Rights Advocate
- Parent(s): Massouda Jalal (mother); Faizullah Jalal (father)
- Website: hasinajalal.com

Hasina Jalal (Dari: حسینه جلال) is a women's rights and pro-democracy advocate, and an exiled scholar from Afghanistan, with over a decade and a half of experience in policy advocacy, civil society engagement, and academic scholarship. In 2014, Jalal was elected by public vote to receive the "N-Peace Award" from the UN Secretary General's Special Advisor on the University for Peace and UNDP Asia Pacific Regional Office. Hasina is a member of the New University in Exile Consortium (NUIEC) and Scholars at Risk (SAR), and a Fellow of the Pittsburgh Network for Threatened Scholars. She has taught political science, economics, and human rights-related courses at political science departments as well as business schools in both the US and Afghanistan. She held several senior positions within the Government of Afghanistan, including serving as the Research Team Lead and Policy Expert at the Presidential Palace and Policy Advisor to the Minister and Director of the Program Design and Donor Coordination Directorate at the Ministry of Mines and Petroleum.

She co-founded and served as the executive director of the National Association of Afghanistan Civil Society (NAACS), and played a key role in establishing the first South Asian alliance focused on women's economic, social, and cultural rights (SAFA) in Sri Lanka. In addition, she has held leadership roles in local and national political campaigns and has led grassroots mobilization efforts in Afghanistan.

== Personal life ==
Hasina comes from a family invested in state of democracy, human rights, and equality in Afghanistan and beyond. Her mother, Masouda Jalal, Afghanistan's first female Presidential candidate, former Minister of Women's Affairs, and former UN high-level national staff, was imprisoned by the Taliban regime in 1990s for promoting education and employment for women. She was detained after trying to hire 3,000 women for bakery jobs and was released following intervention by the United Nations Headquarters. During her tenure as Minister of Women's Affairs, she traveled extensively across Afghanistan. On an official trip to Takhar province, her convoy was targeted and bombed, resulting in two of her guards being severely injured. In 2010, gunmen attacked two Jalal Foundation women's rights activists in Helmand province when they were on an official trip, killing one and putting the other in a coma. During her third run for the Office of President in 2019, Jalal boldly critiqued extremism and the violations of human rights and women's rights in the national and international media. This resulted in several attempted attacks on her and her family members, including her house and office were bombed by the enemies of peace and democracy.

Her father, Faizullah Jalal's, former professor of Law and Political Science and Vice-Chancellor of Kabul University, political commentator and a long-time activist against authoritarian regimes in Afghanistan. First arrested in 1978 for his role in protests against the communist coup in Afghanistan and was held and tortured in Pul-e-Charkhi prison for 18 months. After his release, he was a lecturer at Kabul University. In 1993, he was appointed vice-chancellor of the university, a position he held until 1996, when the Taliban seized Kabul. In 2001, after the fall of the Taliban, he was appointed deputy minister of education, before returning to academia. By the time he got married, he had lost almost his entire family, making him and his elder sister last surviving members of their family. His father, who was a farmer and eldest brother died of tuberculosis at a young age due to poverty and lack of medical care. Three of his brothers, a cousin and a nephew were killed during the Afghan civil war of the 1970s and by the USSR-backed communist regime.

Hasina sought asylum in the United States following the Taliban takeover of Afghanistan, while her family, including her parents and siblings, was evacuated to Europe and sought asylum there. Separated from her family and unable to return to Afghanistan she continued to advocate for Afghan women's rights and democracy, using her platform to amplify their voices and influence international policy and discourse. She is a affiliated with the New University in Exile Consortium and Scholars at Risk as an exiled and endangered scholar.

She is fluent in Persian, Pashto, English, Turkish, Hindi/Urdu, and has proficiency in Dutch, Arabic, Punjabi, and Uzbek languages.

== Education ==
Hasina Jalal has pursued graduate studies at the School of Foreign Service at Georgetown University and is pursuing a PhD in Public and International Affairs at the University of Pittsburgh. She holds an MBA from the American University of Afghanistan as a USAID merit-based scholar and a MA in Women and Gender Studies from the University of Northern Iowa as a Fulbright scholar.

She has obtained her undergraduate degree in economics with a minor in political science from the Jamia Millia Islamia (JMI)—a central university located in Delhi, India— where she was an ICCR scholar. Prior to attending JMI, she completed one academic year of a Bachelor of Arts in Economics program at Kabul University.

== Career ==
Hasina Jalal has served in the government of Afghanistan as a Research Team Lead and Policy Expert at the Presidential Palace/Administrative Office of the President of Afghanistan where she led a team of researchers, conducted policy-oriented research, and presented findings and recommendations to the former President of Afghanistan. She also worked as a Policy Advisor and Director of Program Design and Donor Coordination Directorate at the Ministry of Mines and Petroleum of the Government of Afghanistan. In this role, she managed the initiatives and programs funded by foreign aid to the oil, gas, and mining sectors of Afghanistan, and provided policy advice to the Minister of Mines and Petroleum. Additionally, Hasina has taught economics, human rights, and political science-related courses at business schools as well as political science departments in both the US and Afghanistan.

Hasina has established, managed, and co-founded several civil society organizations in Afghanistan and at the South Asian regional level. Since 2012, she has been the co-founder and executive director of the National Association of Afghanistan Civil Society (NAACS) and the first alliance of South Asian women on Women's Economic, Social, and Cultural Rights (SAFA) in Sri Lanka.

Hasina has been selected for several prestigious fellowships and academic appointments at institutions including Cornell University, the University of Pittsburgh, the Mercatus Center at George Mason University, and Georgetown University’s School of Foreign Service. She is also affiliated with the New University in Exile Consortium, Scholars at Risk, and the Pittsburgh Network for Threatened Scholars initiative..

Hasina's work in gender equality, human rights, women's empowerment, and democracy has been recognized by several regional and international awards and honors: In 2012, Asian Rural Women's Coalitions (ARWC) awarded her with the "Honoring 100 Asian Women Award". In 2014, she was elected by public vote to receive the "N-Peace Award" from the UNDP Asia Pacific Regional Office and the UN Secretary General's Special Advisor on the University for Peace. In 2016, she was awarded the "Global Women Leadership Award" by the World-CSR, and in 2017, she received the "World Super Achiever Award" by World Human Rights Congress. Hasina was awarded the "Iconic Women Creating a Better World for All Award" from the Women's Economic Forum in 2020, and in 2021, the Afghan public voted for her to be elected as one of the "45 Most Influential Afghan Women".

For more details, see her website: hasinajalal.com
