= Habibullah Qaderi =

Afghan politician (born 1961)

Engineer Habibullah Qaderi (born 1961 in Kandahar province, Afghanistan) is a former Minister of Counter Narcotics in Afghanistan, serving between January 2004 and July 2007. Qaderi resigned in July 2007 to take up post as Afghan Counsul General in Ottawa, Ontario, Canada. He was succeeded as Minister of Counter Narcotics by General Khodaidad.

== Professional life ==
Qaderi left Afghanistan at the outbreak of war with the Soviet Union, spending time in Pakistan and India. Following the conclusion of his education, Qaderi worked with the United Nations High Commission for Refugees in the Chaman, Loralai and Dalbandin refugee camps. He also served as an English tutor in Quetta, Pakistan, as part of a programme established by the University of Nebraska–Lincoln.

He returned to Afghanistan following the establishment of the interim Afghan Administration under President Hamid Karzai, initially as the senior advisor to the Ministry of Refugees and Repatriation. Qaderi was appointed as the head of the Afghan Ministry of Counter Narcotics in January 2004, following the establishment of that Ministry in December 2003.
