= Mahboba Hoqooqmal =

Afghan politician

- Born: 1944; Kabul Province, Afghanistan
- Died: 30 October 2020 (aged 75–76)
- Occupation: politician
- Known for: Served on the Constitutional Loya Jirga

Mahboba Hoqooqmal was an Afghan politician.

She was a Law Professor at Kabul University. She was appointed to the Emergency Loya Jirga of 2002, serving as its Vice-President. She also served on the Constitutional Loya Jirga, which sat from 2002 through 2004. She served on the sixth of its ten committees, chaired by Maulowi Gul Muhammad. Her committee drafted 22 articles.

During the 2002-2004 period she also served as Minister of State and Presidential Advisor for Women's Affairs for the Afghan Transitional Administration. In 2005 she was appointed to the Meshrano Jirga, the upper house of the Afghani legislature.

Hoquqmal died in October 2020.
