= Faizullah Jalal =

Afghan law professor

- فیض‌الله جلال
- Born: May 22, 1963 (age 62); Badakhshan, Kingdom of Afghanistan
- Spouse: Massouda Jalal
- Children: Hasina Jalal, Husna Jalal

Dr. Faizullah Jalal (Persian: فیض‌الله جلال) was born on 22 May 1963 in Badakhshan, Afghanistan. Being a first generation college and high-school student, he served as a law and political science professor at the Kabul University for more than 35 years. He also served as head of the Department of Law and Political Science for 14 years, as the Vice-Chancellor of the Kabul University (one of the principal and oldest institutions of higher education in Afghanistan), and as Deputy Minister for Academic Affairs in the Ministry of Higher Education of Afghanistan.

Professor Jalal has a bachelor's degree in Law and Political Science from Kabul University and a master's and Ph.D. in Political Science from the Tajik National University. He is the author of several published books and a variety of articles. His recent books include (1) Political Power and Nation-Building in Afghanistan, (2) The Face of International Terrorism, and (3) An Inquiry into Violence Against Women in Afghanistan.

Professor Faizullah Jalal has been an activist for human rights, peace, equality, and democracy in Afghanistan for almost five decades, standing up for these causes in the face of a series of governments.

In 1976, while still in his hometown of Badakhshan, he was expelled from middle school at the age of 13 for his political activism. He afterward moved to Kabul to resume his studies. In 1979, after the Soviet invasion of Afghanistan, he took part in political resistance against the Soviet-backed regime of the day, resulting in his arrest and imprisonment. His lifelong resistance for democracy, human rights, equality, and a just Afghanistan led him to endure 18 months of imprisonment during the USSR-backed communist regime, as well as further imprisonments and torture during both the first and second Taliban regimes. During his 18 months-long imprisonment, he was repeatedly tortured and was actually sentenced to death by hanging until he finally won release on the basis of his young age, being only 17 then.

Amid these hardships, he endured profound personal loss. By the time he married at around 32 or 33 years old, he had already lost his entire family, leaving him and his elder sister as the only survivors. His father, a farmer, and eldest brother both succumbed to tuberculosis at a young age, victims of poverty and inadequate medical care. During the violent Afghan civil war of the 1970s and the subsequent Soviet-backed communist regime, three of his brothers, along with a cousin and a nephew, were brutally killed. Because of his connection to Professor Jalal, the Soviet-backed regime captured and executed his younger brother while Professor Jalal was imprisoned. Later, under the Mujahidin and warlord-led government, his nephew and cousin were targeted and killed due to Professor Jalal’s outspoken activism against extremism.

During the Taliban’s rule in the 1990s, Professor Jalal faced repeated arrests for allegedly teaching liberal ideas in the Law and Political Science Department at Kabul University. Each time, he endured torture and threats — yet he remained steadfast in his convictions. This profound legacy of sacrifice and resilience continues to inspire the family’s unwavering commitment to Afghanistan’s progress.

In 2001, after the collapse of the Taliban regime, Professor Jalal was elected by his Kabul neighbors to the 2002 Emergency Loya Jirga (Grand Assembly) of Afghanistan. In 2003, he was part of the Constitutional Loya Jirga of Afghanistan where, with his knowledge and background in Law, he actively collaborated in drafting the current and unrevoked Constitution of Afghanistan. In 2002 and 2004 and again in 2019 he co-managed the pathbreaking campaigns of his wife, Dr. Massouda Jalal, for the presidency of Afghanistan when she ran against Hamid Karzai and later Ashraf Ghani, and he supported her when she served as Minister of Women's Affairs in the government from 2004 to 2006, championing the cause of women's rights by his own examples.

Through the civil wars and during both Taliban regimes, Professor Jalal never left Afghanistan. His resolve to remain in his homeland and play a significant part in its life repeatedly endangered him, however. He and his family survived violent attacks explicitly directed at them, largely as a result of Professor Jalal's actions and public statements. In 2019, his house in Kabul was bombed by terrorists. Most recently, on January 8, 2022, Professor Faizullah Jalal was forcibly taken from his home by the Taliban. This happened soon after he openly challenged Taliban policies on Afghanistan's most popular TV station – TOLO News – and allegedly posted a message on Twitter criticizing the Taliban regime. His TV broadside, delivered "live" in direct response to a Taliban spokesman appearing by video in an interview segment, was watched by many thousands of riveted Afghan viewers. In it, Jalal vigorously declared:

"You can't accomplish anything with terror or forceful rants! This country is the homeland of all the people of Afghanistan. This is not the homeland of just one tribe. This is not the homeland of just one group. This is not the homeland of just one class. This is not the homeland of just 'some' people... National interest is the interest of the entire population of Afghanistan, which has a national component as well as regional and international components: support of the people, contentment of the people, support of the region, contentment of the region, support of the superpowers...I am a professor of law and political science...I have resisted against Pakistan, against Iran, against America and against Russia too. And I have no fears either."

He continued using his position and his TV appearance to say what millions of Afghans might have wanted to say, but dared not:

"And I am saddened by the current situation in Kabul! People don't have food to eat. And the security...do you know what security means? People can't speak freely... people are actively escaping [leaving the country]. They [the Taliban] must self-critique and must reform themselves."

After Professor Jalal was arrested, numerous Afghans from inside and outside Afghanistan vociferously demanded his release from detention. Remarkably in the force of Taliban prohibitions, groups of Afghan women protested in his support on the streets of Kabul. Outside the country Amnesty International, Human Rights Watch, Scholars at Risk, members of the US House Foreign Affairs Committee, the UK Parliament, and multiple Afghan diplomatic missions still associated with the Islamic Republic of Afghanistan called for his liberation, along with many rights activists and individual scholars who found his detention deplorable as an arbitrary assault on personal and academic freedom.

In the face of this unprecedented international outcry for this advocate for all Afghans, and after the Twitter account from which Professor Jalal supposedly issued critical tweets has been proven fake, Professor Jalal was freed from prison. Daughter Hasina Jalal told VOA News afterward that domestic and international pressure had led to her father's release. Speaking on VOA sister network Radio Azadi, Jalal himself insisted true to form that despite the Taliban warning him to be more respectful, he would continue "telling the truth".

Over five decades of personal activism for human rights, rule of law, and against extremism, corruption and warlords in Afghanistan, Professor Faizullah Jalal has shown tremendous courage indirectly addressing the issues that have long caused great pain and suffering to the people of Afghanistan. Repeatedly disregarding risk to his own life and liberty he has raised his voice for the voiceless. In doing so, he has honored the highest calling of a scholar, a public intellectual, a defender of freedom, and an advocate of peace. He has also honored Afghanistan itself by embodying its people's aspirations and their indomitable fortitude, even in the face of fear, destruction and despair.
