= Suhaila Siddiq =

Afghan politician (1938–2020)

Lieutenant General Suhaila Siddiq
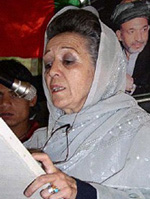

Minister of Public Health of Afghanistan
- In office December 2001 – 2004
- President: Hamid Karzai

Personal details
- Born: 11 March 1938 Kabul, Kingdom of Afghanistan
- Died: 4 December 2020 (aged 71)

Suhaila Siddiq (11 March 1949 – 4 December 2020), often referred to as 'General Suhaila' and the 'Golden Hand', was an Afghan politician. She served as the Minister of Public Health from December 2001 to 2004. Prior to that, she worked as the Surgeon General in the military of Afghanistan. As a government minister, she was given the title Honorable before her name. Siddiq was one of the few female government leaders in Afghanistan, and is the only woman in the history of Afghanistan to have held the title of lieutenant general. General Seddiq had worked for the government of Afghanistan since the reign of Mohammed Zahir Shah, and was additionally a paratrooper of the Afghan Commando Forces.

== Early life and education ==
General Suhaila was born in Kabul, Afghanistan. She was born on March 11, her exact birth year is unknown, believed to be either 1938 or 1949. She belonged to the royal Barakzai Mohammadzai Pashtun lineage. She was one of six daughters; her father was a governor of Kandahar.

After completing high school, she attended Kabul Medical University but completed her medical studies at Moscow State University in what was then the Soviet Union.

== Careers ==
During the government of Mohammad Najibullah (1987–1992), Siddiq was given the rank of surgeon general. She was the chief of surgery at the main Kabul hospital in Wazir Akbar Khan before and after the Taliban. Under the Taliban, she kept up the instruction of medicine for women, and managed to reopen the women's section of the hospital where she worked, after the Taliban had closed it.

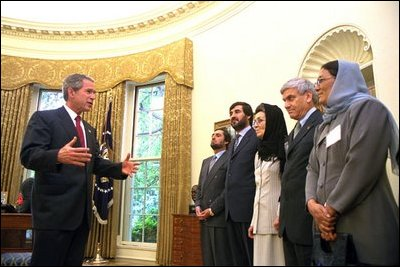
U.S. President George W. Bush in a meeting with Afghan ministers in the Oval Office on July 24, 2002. Pictured from left, are: Abdullah Abdullah, Sayed Mustafa Kazemi, Suhaila Siddiq, Mohammad Amin Farhang, and Habiba Sorabi.

Siddiq was well respected by many Afghan feminists for her actions during the Taliban era. Both she and her sister Sidiqa, who was a professor at the Kabul Polytechnical Institute, were two of very few women who successfully refused to wear the burka. She is quoted as having said, "When the religious police came with their canes and raised their arms to hit me, I raised mine to hit them back. Then they lowered their arms and let me go."

After the removal of the Taliban government from Afghanistan by the United States and British Armed Forces, Siddiq was appointed as the Minister of Public Health and sworn in by Interim President Hamid Karzai. One of her first acts was to request help from the international community for the establishment of a medical work force of women. She met a team from the World Health Organization (WHO) that was sent to the war-torn country to assess its health needs, and said that the training of Afghan women is key because they are a crucial asset in the health system.

As minister, in April 2002, Siddiq oversaw the vaccination of about 6 million Afghan children against polio on behalf of the United Nations Children's Fund. In July 2002, she met with a Chinese delegation who agreed to fund the renovation of what was promised to be Afghanistan's most modern hospital. In November 2006, Siddiq presented a speech on AIDS in Afghanistan to Eurasianet in New York City.

== Personal life and death ==
Siddiq lived all her life in Afghanistan. She never married and claimed she was too dedicated to her profession and didn't have time for a husband: "I didn't marry because I didn't want to take orders from a man". Siddiq was one of five daughters of Mohammad Siddiq, a governor of Kandahar, Herat during the reign of King Zahir Shah Khan Her younger sister Mastura Aziz-Sultan, who died in Washington D.C. in 2014, was also a physician, and specialized in Ob/Gyn. Her other sisters reside in San Diego, Geneva, and Sydney. One of her other younger sisters, Sediqa, an engineer passed in 2001 in Kabul.

Siddiq had Alzheimer's disease. She died from complications of COVID-19 in Kabul on 4 December 2020, at the age of 72, during the COVID-19 pandemic in Afghanistan.
