= Mohammed Ehsan Zia =

Mohammed Eshan Zia is the former Minister of Rural Rehabilitation and Development of Afghanistan. He is currently President and CEO of Tadbeer Consulting Inc.

== Background ==
Zia was born in Kabul, Afghanistan. He received a Bachelor's Degree in Social Development from the University of Birmingham in the UK in 1991, and holds a master's degree in Post-War Recovery Studies from the University of York. During the 1990s he worked with Aid Agencies and NGO's involved in humanitarian and post conflict programs in Afghanistan.

== Minister of Rural Rehabilitation and Development ==
During the first Karzai cabinet, he joined the Ministry of Rural Rehabilitation and Development as policy advisor in 2002 and subsequently was appointed Deputy Minister for Programs in January 2004, becoming responsible for a developmentbudget of over 300 mln dollar. He became Rural Development Minister in 2006, but was replaced in 2010 when the second Karzai cabinet was installed.

The Globe and Mail described Zia as one of the most active members of the Afghan cabinet, noting his efforts to travel outside Kabul and direct reconstruction funding toward community-level projects selected by locally chosen councils. The Ministry of Rural Rehabilitation and Development described him as the most widely travelled minister in the Karzai cabinet.

The cornerstone of the Ministry of Rural Development was the National Solidarity Program, a project that provides funding to local communities that have elected their own leaders and initiated their own development efforts.

After his tenure as minister, Zia became CEO of Tadbeer, an Afghan consulting firm in the governance, development and security field.
