= Sayed Ikramuddin Masoomi =

Afghan politician

Governor of Baghlan, Afghanistan
- In office 26 July 2006 – 8 November 2007
- Preceded by: Mohammad Alam Rasikh
- Succeeded by: Alam Ishaqzai

Minister of Work, Social Affairs, Martyred and Disabled, Afghanistan
- In office 2004–2006
- Preceded by: Noor Mohammad Qarqeen
- Succeeded by: Noor Mohammad Qarqeen

Governor of Badakhshan, Afghanistan
- In office ?–2004
- Succeeded by: Sayyed Mohammad Akram

Governor of Takhar, Afghanistan
- In office ?–?
- Preceded by: Mohammed Daud Daud
- Succeeded by: Abdul Kabir Marzban

Personal details
- Born: 1953 (age 72–73) Ashkmash, Takhar Province, Kingdom of Afghanistan
- Profession: Politician

Sayed Ikramuddin Masoomi (Persian: سید اکرام‌الدین معصومی) was born in 1953 in Ashkmash district of Takhar. Masoomi has worked as the Director of Enterprises for the Ministry of Finance, as Deputy Minister of Finance as later as Governor of Takhar and Badakhshan Provinces of Afghanistan. After his time as Governor he became Minister of Labor and Social Affairs under President Karzai. In 2004 he was appointed as Minister of Work, Social Affairs, Martyred and Disabled. He was replaced in 2006 by Noor Mohammad Qarqeen. Sayed Ekramuddin Masomi then served for more than a year as Governor of Baghlan Province.

== Notes ==
Preceded by Mohammad Alam Rasikh	Governor of Baghlan, Afghanistan; 2006–2007	Succeeded by Alam Ishaqzai
Preceded by Noor Mohammad Qarqeen	Minister of Work, Social Affairs, Martyred and Disabled, Afghanistan; 2004–2006	Succeeded by Noor Mohammad Qarqeen
Preceded by	Governor of Badakhshan ?–2004	Succeeded by Sayyed Mohammad Akram
Preceded by Mohammed Daud Daud	Governor of Takhar ?–?	Succeeded by Abdul Kabir Marzban
