= Prostitution in Afghanistan =

Prostitution is illegal in Afghanistan, with punishments ranging from 5 to 15 years of imprisonment. The country is deeply religious and one of the most conservative countries in the world, where sex outside marriage is not only against the law but could lead to serious consequences, even capital punishment.

Paying "..for sex gives [clients] easy access to women that they otherwise would not be able to meet or could only have contact with if they were married -- a costly exercise in itself."

Despite the dangers, several NGOs have reported a rise in prostitution stemming from poverty. APMG Health estimated there to be 12,500 prostitutes in the country in 2015. In 2020 UNAIDS estimated there to be 11,000 prostitutes in Kabul, Herat, Mazar and Jalalabad based on a 2019 survey. Prior to foreign troops withdrawing from the country, there have been reports of sex trafficking and prostitution involving US troops and contractors. Specifically women trafficked from China.

A number of women from China, Iran, Pakistan, the Philippines, Sri Lanka and Tajikistan have been trafficked for prostitution into Afghanistan. Afghan women are also trafficked to Pakistan, Iran and India for sexual exploitation. Child prostitution in the form of bacha bazi have also been reported in the country.

== Legality and consequences ==
The practice of prostitution in Afghanistan has always been illegal, with punishments ranging from 5 to 15 years imprisonment and 80 lashes if unmarried. Married prostitutes are considered adulterers under the Afghan penal code. Prostitution is even more strictly prohibited by the Taliban, with those thought of having extramarital sex risking extrajudicial killing by cultural fundamentalists and Islamists.

=== Extrajudicial risks ===
- In July 2008, two women were accused of running a secret prostitution service and working for the police and killed by the Taliban in the Ghazni Province, although the local authorities as well as the American military in the area at the time claimed the women were innocent.
- Two women accused of prostitution were shot dead in July 2010.

== Dynamics ==
In the 1990s, prostitution existed clandestinely in Kabul, despite being outlawed due to the government following a very strict interpretation of the Islamic Sharia law. Melissa Ditmore reported in Encyclopedia of Prostitution and Sex Work that during their rule the traffic in women for prostitution had thrived. Prostitutes mostly worked from their private homes termed as Qalas and in Kabul there were 25 to 30 hidden brothels.

Prostitution in the country is claimed to be mostly driven by poverty and displacement. Prohibition for women to work under the Taliban regime means some street children have been forced into the trade in order to make a living. According to the 2010 Trafficking in Persons Report from the U.S. Embassy in Kabul, females from Iran, Tajikistan, China, and possibly Uganda and other places have been forced into prostitution in Afghanistan.

Women from Tajikistan are believed to be trafficked through Afghanistan to other countries for prostitution. Trafficked Iranian women transit Afghanistan en route to Pakistan. Afghan women as well as boys and girls among recently returned refugees from neighboring countries have been reported to be forced into prostitution, a number of children were also reported being sold into it by their family.

A 2007 University of Manitoba report suggests that there may be about 900 female prostitutes in Kabul, which is a city with a population of over 4 million today. Latest estimates show that there may be between 11,000 and 12,500 sex workers in Afghanistan. About two to three prostitution arrests were made nationally between 2007 and 2008 each week, according to the Afghan Interior Ministry's department of sexual crimes.

According to Afghan traditions, the shame of prostitution is so intense that sometimes those involved in such activities are assassinated by the many religious extremists found throughout the country or in some cases by family members.

"Prostitution is in every country that has poverty, and it exists in Afghanistan. But society has black glasses and ignores these problems. Tradition is honor, and if we talk about these taboos, then we break tradition."

— Orzala Ashraf, women's rights activist

"In our culture, it is very, very bad."

— Soraya Sobhrang, Afghan Independent Human Rights Commissioner for women's affairs

=== Brothels ===
Brothels, some run by foreigners, with links to larger criminal networks, have managed to exist by paying bribes to police officers who came to raid them. There were reports of several brothels in Mazar-i-Sharif but it is unknown if they still exist today.

The capital Kabul saw a number of Chinese brothels ("Chinese restaurants") opened between 2002 and 2006. Four years later a series of police raids reduced the brothels to 3 which catered, according to Reuters, to a mainly high-income international clientele as Afghan aren't generally accepted in or, according to USA Today, to mostly Afghan men.

"There are 200 of us here in Kabul, we don't go out much. It's not safe. I've been here for two years, the money is okay. We stay indoors. We don't go out."

— A female bartender from northern China, 2006

=== Temporary marriages ===
Nikah mut'ah is a fixed-term marriage practiced mainly in Shia Islam, but is rejected by the majority Sunni Muslims (see misyar marriage, nikah urfi, nikah halala). There have also been some reports about Mut'ah (Fegha in Persian language) beginning to be practiced in Mazar-i-Sharif.

"Nobody would give me their daughters to marry because I didn't have family or money. I started doing 'short marriages' in Iran. When I came back to Mazar-i-Sharif, I continued."

— Payenda Mohammad, a mechanic in Mazari-i-Sharif, 2006.

== Bacha bazi ==
Like in many other Islamic countries, it is a major taboo in Afghan culture for women to openly dance in front of men. Males and females are segregated during weddings and other parties. As a form of adult entertainment, young males dress as females and dance in front of men to make money. "Bacha bereesh" (meaning "boys without beards" in Persian language) occasionally dance to entertain men at certain parties, especially in the north parts of Afghanistan. Powerful patrons sometimes sexually exploit the dancers. It is estimated that about 10,000 men across Afghanistan engage in sexual activities with other men.

== The "Curse of 39" ==
The 'Curse of 39' refers to the belief in some parts of Afghanistan that the number 39 is cursed or a badge of shame as it is purportedly linked with prostitution.

The cause of the number's undesirability is unclear, but it has widely been claimed to have been associated with a pimp, allegedly living in the western city of Herat, who was nicknamed "39" after the registration plate of his expensive car and the number of his apartment. The number is said to translate into morda-gow, literally meaning "dead cow" but a well-known slang term for a pimp. Others have blamed corrupt police officials for spreading the rumour in order to charge between $200–$500 to change a "39" plate.

Vehicle registration plates incorporating the number are seen as so undesirable that vehicles and apartments bearing the numerals are said to be virtually unsellable in the capital, Kabul. The drivers of such vehicles have reported receiving abuse and derision from pedestrians and other drivers, and some have had their registration plates altered to disguise the numbers. One such driver, Zalmay Ahmadi, told The Guardian: "When I drive around all the other cars flash their lights, beep their horns and people point at me. All my classmates now call me Colonel 39." Number plates containing '39' were withdrawn in early 2021.

== Human trafficking ==
In 2019, the United States Department of State Office to Monitor and Combat Trafficking in Persons downgraded Afghanistan to a 'Tier 2 watchlist' country' and in 2020 further downgraded the country to 'Tier 3'. The Government of Afghanistan does not fully meet the minimum standards for the elimination of trafficking and is not making significant efforts to do so. The country remained in 'Tier 3' in 2021. A number of Afghan women and girls sold in Pakistan, Iran and India are exploited in sex trafficking and domestic servitude by their new husbands.

Traffickers have subjected women and girls from China, Iran, Pakistan, Philippines, Sri Lanka, and Tajikistan to sex trafficking in Afghanistan. Afghan women, and children pay intermediaries to assist them in finding employment abroad, primarily in Iran, Pakistan, and Europe; some intermediaries and employers force Afghans into sex trafficking.

== See also ==
- The Dancing Boys of Afghanistan (documentary)
- Women's rights in Afghanistan
