= Kiligai =

Location in Baghlan Province, Afghanistan

Kiligai (Kilagai, Kilagay, Kila Gai, Qalagai, Dasht-e Kiligai) is a location in Baghlan Province, Afghanistan, which during the Soviet-Afghan War held one of the three major Soviet bases in Afghanistan (the other two being Shindand and Bagram). It was described in 1987 by the BBC Monitoring Service as the "largest military supply and armoury centre of the Soviet troops in Afghanistan."

The base was located near a strategic north-south corridor, and included a large underground tank-repair depot. In 1988, as the Soviets prepared their withdrawal, the possibility of "maintaining negotiated access" to the Kiligai tank repair facility was discussed.
