= Ministry of Information and Culture (Afghanistan) =

Government ministry of Afghanistan

- (Dari: وزارت اطلاعات و فرهنگ; Pashto: د اطلاعاتو او فرهنګ وزارت)
- Ministry flag

Agency overview
- Jurisdiction: Government of Afghanistan
- Headquarters: Mohammad Jan Khan Road, Kabul, Afghanistan; 34.519312°N 69.174688°E
- Minister responsible: Sheikh Sher Ahmad Haqqani
- Deputy Ministers responsible: Hayatullah Muhajir Farahi; Abdul Rahim Saqib (youth affairs); Atiqullah Azizi (finance and administration)
- Website: moic.gov.af

The Ministry of Information and Culture (Dari: وزارت اطلاعات و فرهنگ, Pashto: د اطلاعاتو او فرهنګ وزارت) in Afghanistan is the official government ministry in charge of affairs relating to culture, publications, tourism, and youths. It is headquartered in Kabul and currently headed by Sheikh Sher Ahmad Haqqani. His predecessor was Khairullah Khairkhwa.

== Ministers ==
Abdul Rahim Nevin	July 17, 1973 - April 28, 1978	Nevin was appointed by President Mohammad Daoud Khan as the first Information and Culture Minister of the Republic of Afghanistan.
Amir Khan Muttaqi		under Mullah Omar in the Islamic Emirate of Afghanistan (1996-2001).
Sayed Makhdoom Raheen	December 2001 - March 2006	Founder of the Association for Peace and Democracy for Afghanistan (APDA).; Did not receive enough votes of confidence in the Afghan Parliament and had to resign.
Abdul Karim Khoram	March 2006 - January 2010	
Sayed Makhdoom Raheen	January 2010 - April 2015	Returned as Minister of Information and Culture after being Afghan Ambassador to India and this time received enough votes of confidence.
Abdul Bari Jahani	April 2015 - November 2016	Jahani served as foreign aid manager for the Ministry of Education for two years (1976 and 1978.) In 1981 he was appointed as Deputy Director of Radio Television Afghanistan. Jahani joined Voice of America (VOA) in 1983. He retired from VOA in 2010.; Jahani has written the lyrics of Afghan National Anthem.
Khairullah Khairkhwa	7 September 2021 - 1 September 2025	
Sheikh Sher Ahmad Haqqani	1 September 2025 - present	

Former Minister of Information, Culture and Youth Affairs, now MoIC:

- Dr. Sayed Makhdoom Raheen Rahin,
- Abdul Karim Khurram (2009),
- Dr. Sayed Makhdoom Raheen (20100103-20140930),
- Dr. Sayed Makhdoom Raheen Acting Minister of (Information), Culture and Youth (20141001)
- acting Minister of Information and Culture Ghulam Nabi Farahi (20141209)
- Acting Minister of Information and Culture, Sayed Mosaddiq Khalili (20150213)
- Abdul Bari Jahani (20150418, 20161107) vote of no confidence
- Mrs. Sayeda Muzhgan Mostafavi, acting Minister of Information and Culture (20171023)
- Prof. Mohammad Rasoul Bawari acting Minister (20170423, 20180625)
- Fazel Sancharaki, acting (20180102)
- Mrs. Hassina Safi acting (20180625, 20190107)
- Tahir Zuhair Taher Zuhair (20200405-20210712) nominated and acting not confirmed
- Zabiullah Mojahid, Minister of Information, Culture and Youth Affairs and Taliban Spokesman (20210901) acting
- Mullah Khairullah Khairkhwa (20210916, 20220201) acting, Maulvi Hayatullah Mujahir Farahi has been appointed as deputy minister for Information and Culture, replacing Zabihullah Mujahid (20220821)

Deputy Minister of Culture and Arts:

- Mawlawi Atiqullah Azizi (20220305)

Deputy Minister of Youth Affairs:

- Mullah Faizullah Tamim (20220305)

Deputy Minister:

- Ahmad Zia Afshar, acting deputy minister for cultural affairs, has not been seen over the past three months. He has disappeared in Canada (20100328),
- Zabiullah Mojahid (20210916)
- Mullah Faizullah Akhund (20211122)
- Maulvi Atiqullah Azizi, deputy minister of finance and administration at the Ministry of Information and Culture (20211122)

Deputy Minister of Culture and Arts, and Mullah Faizullah

Deputy Minister of Information and Culture on Publication Affairs:

- Mobariz Rashidi Mubarez Rashidi (20100225, 20111226),
- Mrs. Simin Hassanzada, Simeen Hasanzada (20141112, 20150207) Simeen Hasanzada has been dismissed for publicly endorsing the brutal murder of Farkhunda over false allegation of Quran burning.(20150402),
- Mrs Sayeda Muzhgan Mustafawi deputy of publication (20150621, 20171212)
- Sayed Hussain Fazel Sancharaki Sayed Aqa Fazel Sancharaki Fazil Sancharaki (20170503, 20180702, 20200208)
- Abdul Manan Shiway-e Sharq (20200209, 20200923)
- Haroon Hakimi (20210511)

Deputy Minister Of ministry of information and culture in youth affairs:

- Mohammad Zahir Ghaus Zaher Gauss (20091124)
- Taimoor Shah Eshaqzai, Timor Shah Ishaqzai Temor Shah Ishaqzai (20111224, 20150207)
- Dr. Kamal Sadaat (20151006, 20161009, 20181203)
- Mohammad Rasoul Bawari (Hazara) has been appointed as deputy minister of culture and art for information and culture.(20170117, 20180625)
- Dr. Kamal Sadaat (20151006, 20161009, 20181203)
- Mohammad Ajmal Shahpoor (20190923)

Deputy in the Ministry of Information and Culture:

- Sayed Musadiq Khalili, Masaddiq Khalili, Sayed Masaddeq Khalili Sayed Mosadiq Khalili( (20120430, 20150526, 20160119))

Deputy Information and Culture Minister on Publications:

- Mrs. Simin Hassanzada, Simeen Hasanzada (20141112, 20150207) Simeen Hasanzada has been dismissed for publicly endorsing the brutal murder of Farkhunda over false allegation of Quran burning.(20150402),
- Mrs Sayeda Mrs. Muzhgan Mustafawi deputy of publication (20150621, 20171212)
- Abdul Manan Shiway-e Sharq (20200923)

Deputy publications of the Ministry of Information and Culture:

- Mawlavi Hayatullah Muhajir Farahi (20221118)

Deputy of tourism, finance and administrative affairs:

- Zardasht Shams (20150526)
- Sayeda Muzhgan Mostafawi, former deputy of publication for Ministry of Information and Culture (MoIC) has been appointed as administrative, financial and tourism deputy minister of MoIC.(20170311)
- Abdul Bashir Hakimi, Deputy Minister of Finance, Admin and Tourism of the Ministry of Information and Culture (20210503)

== See also ==
- Culture of Afghanistan
- Mass media in Afghanistan
- Tourism in Afghanistan
