= Noor Mohammad Qarqin =

Noor Mohammad Qarqin (born 1953 in a village in Qarqeen District of Jowzjan Province, Afghanistan) is a former minister in the Afghan government and ambassador. He is an ethnic Turkmen and has a Bachelor of Science from Kabul University.

== Early life ==
In 1978, he began service in the Ministry of Education as a member of the Uzbek and Turkmen Department, and later had a leading position in the gas and oil industry in Hairatan. After the Soviet invasion he moved to Pakistan and took part in the Islamic resistance against the communist regime. In December 2001 he returned to Afghanistan and played a role in the Loya Jirga's that were set up to give Afghanistan a new administration and a new constitution.

== Government minister ==
Between 2002 and 2004 Qarqeen was Social Affairs Minister of Afghanistan in the Transitional Administration, headed by Hamid Karzai. In the first presidential elections after the fall of the Taliban, he was director of the successful campaign of Karzai. He was rewarded with the position of education minister in the cabinet that Karzai appointed in 2004.

After the election of the Wolesi Jirga, Karzai reshuffled his cabinet in 2006. The Ministry of Disabled and Martyrs was merged with the Ministry of Social Affairs and the new portfolio was given to Qarqeen.

== Ambassador ==
In the second Karzai administration Qarqeen didn't return as minister. He was made ambassador to Kyrgyzstan instead. His posting ended on Sep 30, 2016.
