= Sediqa Balkhi =

Afghan politician (born 1950)

Sediqa Balkhi صدیقه بلخی
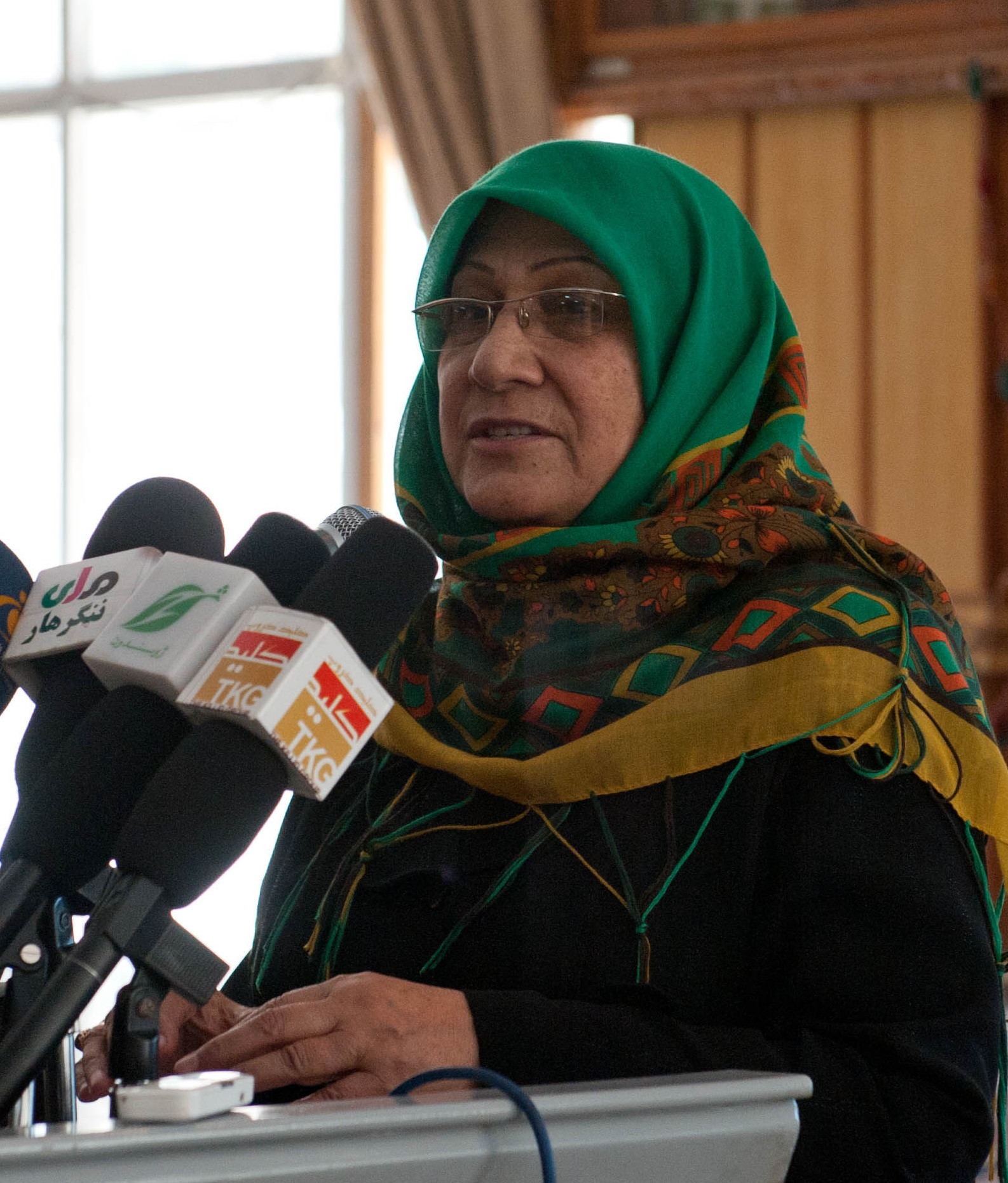
- Sediqa Balkhi in September 2013

Personal details
- Born: 1950 (age 75–76) Mazar-i-Sharif, Balkh Province, Kingdom of Afghanistan
- Occupation: Politician

Sediqa Balkhi (Dari: صدیقه بلخی) is an Afghan politician and former Minister in the government of Hamid Karzai.

== Early life ==
Balkhi was born in 1950 in Mazar-i-Sharif, Balkh province, Afghanistan. Her father, Ismael Balkhi, was imprisoned multiple times in Afghanistan and ultimately poisoned. She completed her B.A. in Islamic Studies and pursued further education while staying in Iran. She taught for a while and worked as a manager. She was married at a young age and had six children. Her brother, Seyyed Ali Balkhi, was an economist who was killed during the reign of the communist People's Democratic Party of Afghanistan.

== Career ==
Balkhi led the Islamic Center for Political and Cultural Activities of Afghan Women during the Taliban rule, which was based in Khorasan Province, Iran. She moved to Afghanistan in 1991 where she continued her work secretly. In December 2001, she was one of three women who participated in the Bonn Agreement. She was elected twice to the Meshrano Jirga (upper house of the Afghan bicameral parliament). She served as the Chair of the Women's Affairs Committee in the Meshrano Jirga. She served the Minister of Martyrs and Disabled in the Hamid Karzai government from 2004 to 2009. In 2005, Balkhi and Afghan army chief Bismillah Khan Mohammadi survived a helicopter crash. The crash is thought to be an accident.
