= Karim Khoram =

Cabinet minister

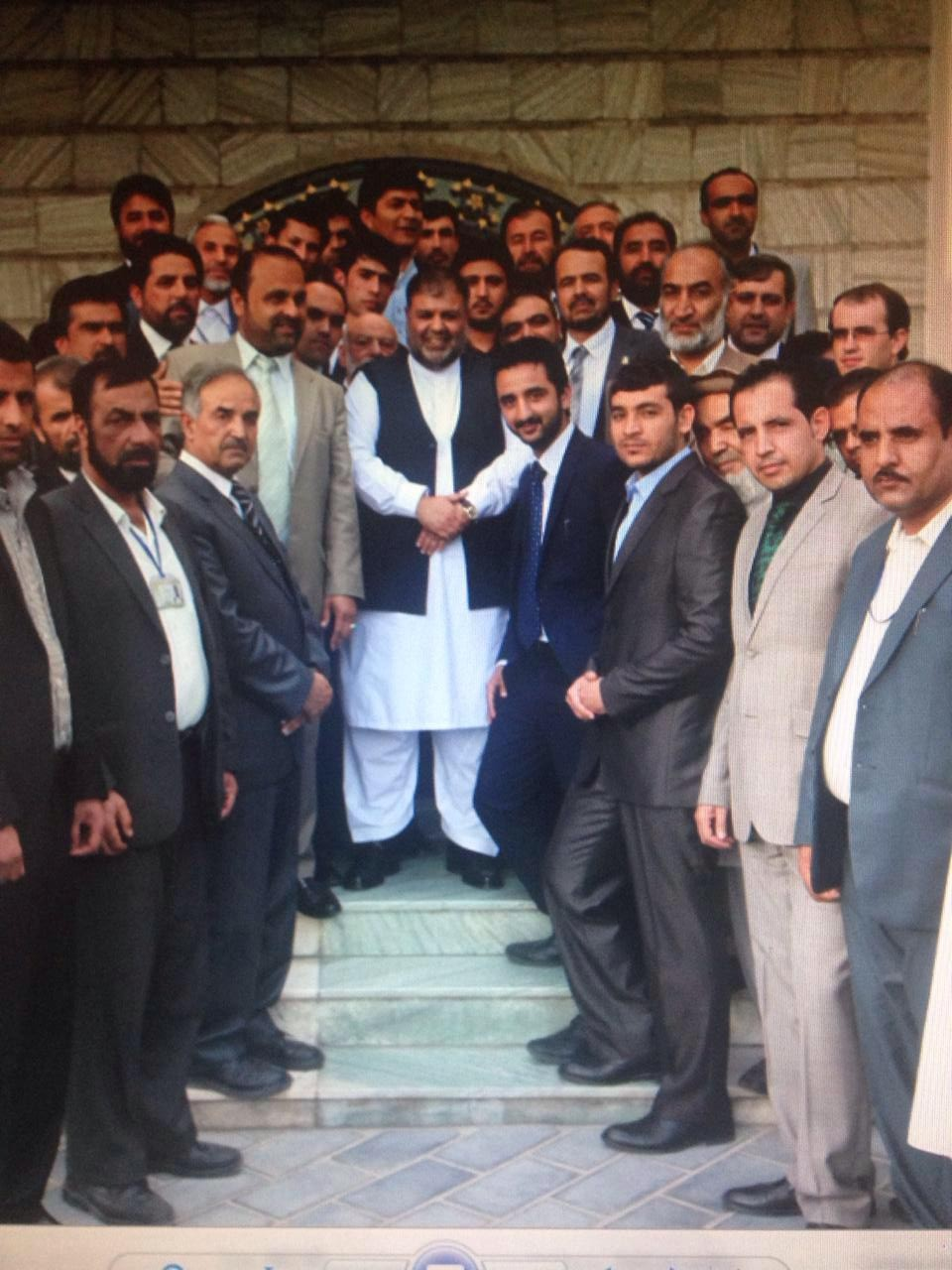
- Abdul Karim Khurram with staff, while leaving office (2014). Arg, Kabul, Afghanistan

Chief of Staff to the President of Govt of Afghanistan
- In office 2011–2014
- Preceded by: Omar Dawoodzai
- Succeeded by: Fazel Mahmood Fazly

Personal details
- Born: 1963 (age 62–63) Kabul, Kingdom of Afghanistan

Abdul Karim Khoram (Pashto: عبدالکریم خرم) (born 1963) is the former Afghan President Hamid Karzai's Chief of Staff from 2011 to 2014. As the presidential chief of staff, Khoram controls the Government Media and Information Center (GMIC) and therefore the Afghan government's message.

Previously he acted as the Minister for Culture and Information also in the cabinet of Hamid Karzai.

== Biography ==
Abdul Karim Khoram was born in Kabul Province in 1963 to a Pashtun family. He completed his primary and secondary education in Kabul City and was then admitted to the Polytechnical University of Kabul in 1982. However, he was imprisoned for three years by the communist regime because of his involvement in anti-communist activities. Therefore, he was not able to complete his higher education at the Polytechnical University of Kabul. In order to complete his higher education, Khoram left for Paris, France in 1991, where he received a master's degree in International law and Diplomacy. While he was still in Paris, Khoram received a second master's degree in Export Law. Afterwards, he served as a professor and expert on Eastern Languages at several French Universities for some time.

== Political and work life ==
Khoram was appointed as a "Minister of Culture, Information, Tourism and Youth Affairs" in May 2006. Khoram also controls the government's message and media relations heading the Government Media and Information Center (GMIC). Khoram furthermore owns at least three private newspapers, a television channel and a radio station.

Former co-workers of Khoram have accused him of following a "brand of conservative Pashtunism" acting "divisive internally" and having isolated Hamid Karzai's "non-Pashtun allies". Al-Jazeera writes: "The damage that Khoram has inflicted on President Karzai's image in one year—his enemies could not have done the same."

== Controversy and criticism ==
Karim Khurram is regarded by many—even among his own circle—as a Pashtun nationalist. After becoming minister for culture and information, he removed the Persian sign on the ministry's building and replaced it with a Pashto one (Persian and Pashto are the two official languages of Afghanistan). On February 10, 2008, he suspended three journalists for five days and fined them five days' pay for using the Persian word for university ("daneshgah") instead of the Pashto word ("pohantoon") in their Dari articles.

Khoram also scrapped initial plans to integrate the Afghan National Radio and Television into the public service run by an independent board. He put the state television and radio under his personal control instead. This led to calls for impeachment.
