= Sayed Makhdoom Raheen =

Afghan diplomat

- Dari: سید مخدوم رهین
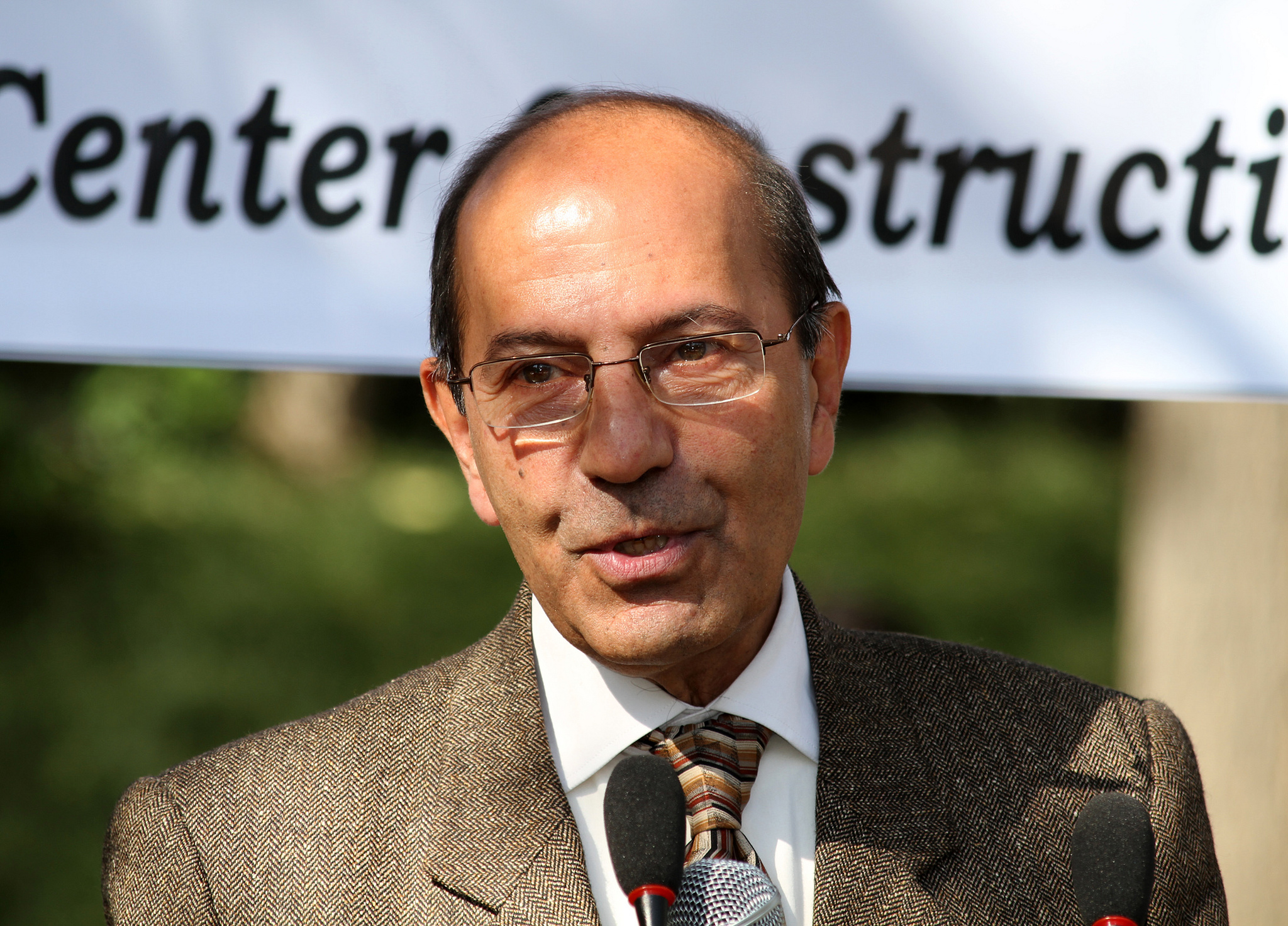
- Born: 1946 (age 79–80); Kabul, Kingdom of Afghanistan
- Occupations: Politician, Diplomat
- Spouse: Jamila Seraj
- Children: Arash Raheen

Dr. Sayed Makhdoom Raheen (Dari: سید مخدوم رهین) is a Dari author and an Afghan politician. He is an ethnic Sayyid (Sunni Dari speaker) and is a dual citizen (holds American citizenship).

== Life ==
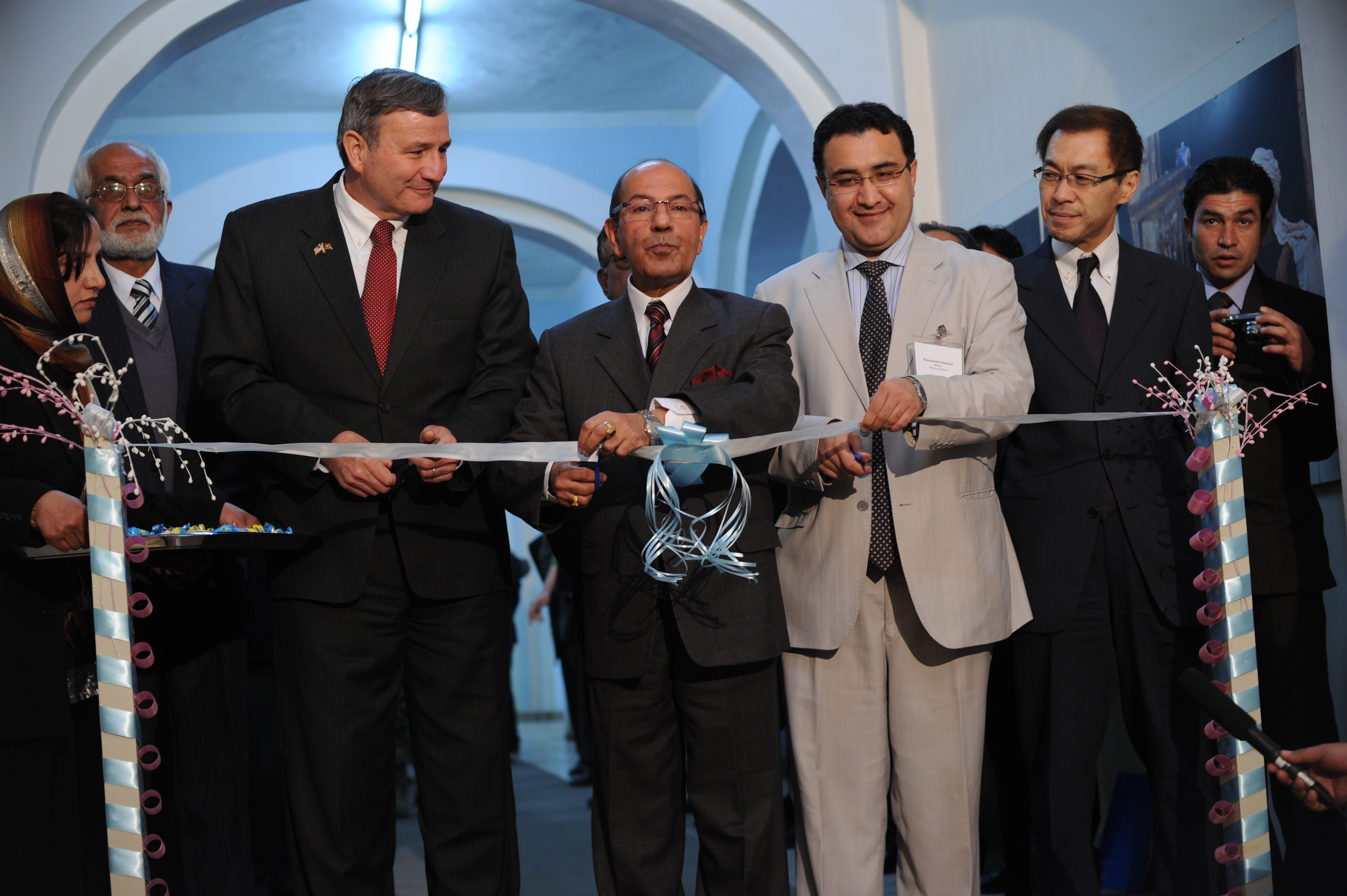
Raheen with Ambassador Karl W. Eikenberry and Waheedullah Shahrani at the Kabul Museum in March 2011.

He was born in 1946 in the Afghan capital of Kabul. He graduated from Habibia High School between the mid-1950s to the early-1960s. During the Soviet–Afghan War form 1979-1989 and communist government of Kabul, he was head of Radio Kabul-e-Azad (Free Kabul). Until March 2015 he was the Afghan Minister of Information and Culture. He previously served Afghanistan's ambassador in India prior to holding the office of Minister of Information and Culture for second time.
