= Khodaidad =

Politician from Afghanistan (born 1955)

Lt. Gen. Khodaidad Hazara
- خدایداد
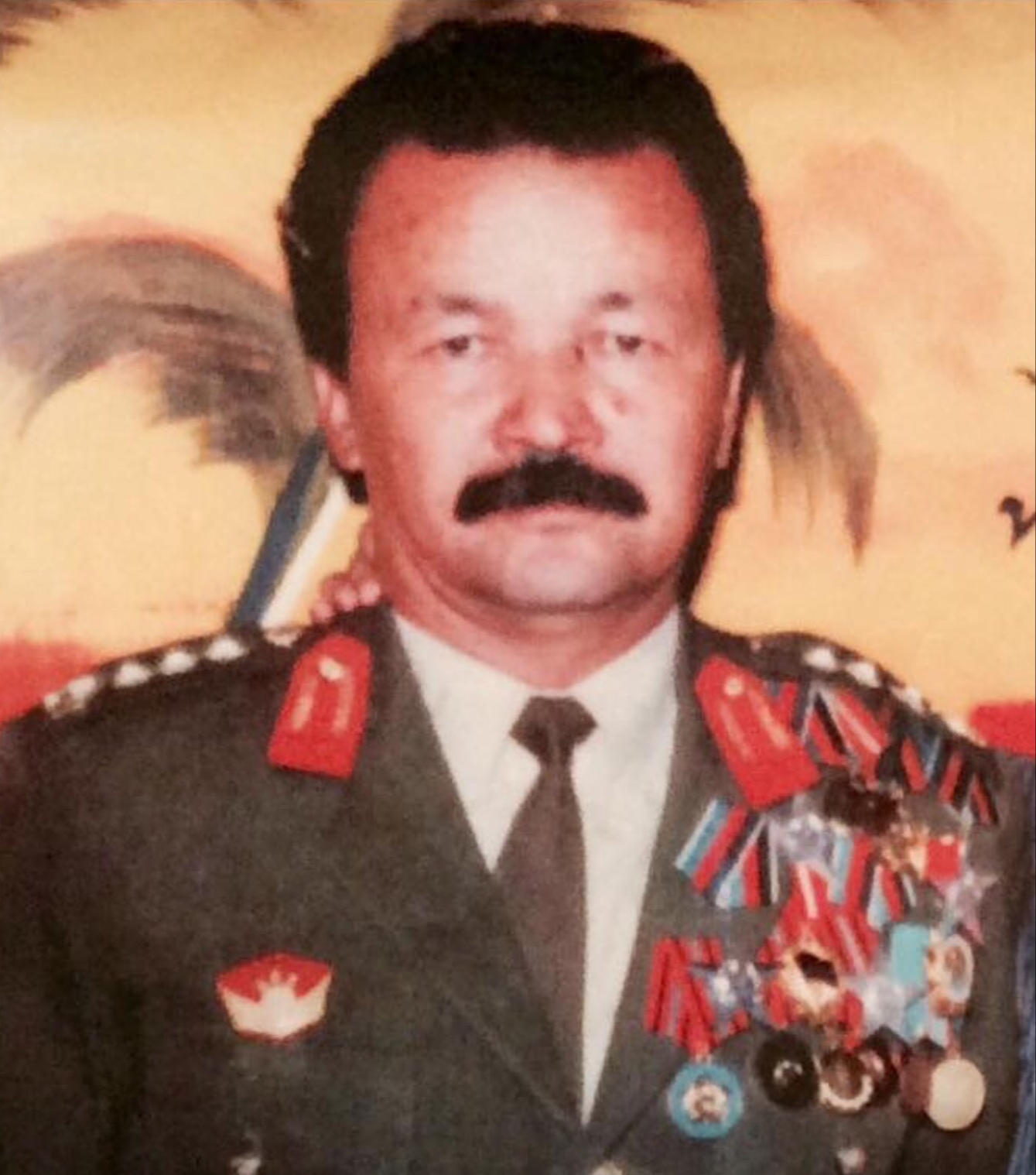

Minister of Counter Narcotics Afghanistan
- In office March 2008 – June 2010
- President: Hamid Karzai

Director of National Security Afghanistan
- In office 1992–1992
- President: Sibghatullah Mojaddedi

Personal details
- Born: Khodaidad; 1955 (age 70–71) Shahristan District, Daykundi (Uruzgan)
- Education: • National Defence Academy • Indian Military Academy • Frunze Military Academy

Military service
- Allegiance: Republic of Afghanistan (1973–1978); Democratic Republic of Afghanistan (1978–1992; Islamic Republic of Afghanistan
- Branch/service: Afghan Army; Afghan Commando Forces; Afghan National Army
- Rank: Lieutenant General
- Battles/wars: Soviet-Afghan war Afghan Civil War (1989-1992)

General Khodaidad Hazara (Dari: خدایداد) is a former Minister of Counter Narcotics of Afghanistan, and former commander of the Afghan Army’s 2nd Infantry Division and the Afghan Commando Forces’ 444th Commando Battalion under the Democratic Republic of Afghanistan.

== Early life and education ==
He was born to an ethnic Hazara family in Shahristan District, Daykundi (Uruzgan) in central Afghanistan, the son of Gholam Ali, a farmer.

Khodaidad completed his primary education at Shahristan Primary School in 1967. During that time the Hazara people hardly advanced to higher education in Kabul due to tribal discrimination in the country. There were no schools for the Hazaras, and it was very difficult to go to Kabul and study. The Hazara areas were under immense pressure from the Central government, who were not supportive and intentionally did not provide educational facilities in the Hazara-based areas. This meant the Hazara people had limited opportunity to develop and go on to further education. In particular, it was very difficult to get places in the army, Ministry of Foreign Affairs, Ministry of Justice and any key roles in the government. However, due to his hard work General Khodaidad managed to obtain a place at Kabul to study. He received his military high school diploma from Kabul Military High School, (Harbi Showanzai) in 1972. He completed his diploma with high marks and was one of the few selected, bright students to go to India to study at the National Defence Academy (NDA), located in Khadakwasla, near Pune, Maharashtra, India, which one of the most prestigious Academy in the world, in 1972. He studied at the NDA for three and a half years.

Khodaidad graduated from the National Defence Academy (NDA) -India successfully and afterwards joined the Indian Military Academy (IMA), located in Dehradun, where he studied until 1977.

== Career ==
After his return from India, Khodaidad had achieved the rank of second lieutenant infantry commando officer in the Afghan Army in 1977. He was the first army officer from the Sharistan district of Daikondi province in the Afghan armed forces. Khodaidad was a member of the People's Democratic Party of Afghanistan-Khalq.

After the 1978 Saur Revolution and the Soviet–Afghan War (1979–1989), he continued serving the government of Afghanistan and in 1983 Khodaidad was a Major and commander of 444 commando brigade. In 1985 he was sent to the Frunze Military Academy, located in Moscow and one of the most-prestigious Soviet military academies, for a period of one year.

Khodaidad's military career includes:

- 1977 – platoon commander and instructor of reserve school of the Ministry of Defence
- 1978 – company commander of military police of the 29th regiment of the Ministry of Defence
- 1978 – commander of reconnaissance company of the 29th regiment of the Ministry of Defence
- 1979 – second battalion commander of 37th paratrooper brigade, in Bala Hissar, Kabul. Due to the differences between Khalq and Parcham groups, after the Soviet invasion of Afghanistan, Khodaidad was posted to Number 17 division and 33 regiment as Head of non-confidential documents.
- 1980 – commander of 2nd training battalion of 444 paratrooper brigade in Panjsher valley
- 1981 – operational director of 444 commando brigade in Panjsher valley
- 1982 – chief of staff of 444 paratrooper brigade in Panjsher valley
- 1983 – commander of 444 paratroopers brigade in Panjsher valley
- 1984 – second in command of 2nd infantry division in Panjsher valley
- 1985 – commander of 2nd infantry division in Panjsher valley
- 1987 – commander of 14th infantry division of Ghazni Province and head of Defense Council of Ghazni and Wardak Province; also commander of operational groups of Ghazni and Wardak provinces in Central Afghanistan. Created and established 3 territorial army division (95, 96, and 97) of Hazara for peace and reconciliation to support the central government of Afghanistan
- 1990 – commander of 54th division and chief of staff of 6th Corps of Kunduz in North East Zone
- 1990 – commander of operational groups of Takhar Province in the North East Zone.
- 1990–1991 Due to the dispute between the Northern Alliance and the Najibulla regime in North of Afghanistan, Khodaidad kept his neutrality and as a result was posted to become an instructor to the Afghan High Officers Course of the Ministry of Defense (Afghanistan).
- 1992 – Minister of National Security during the Sibghatullah Mojaddedi government.

In 1984, during the government of Afghan President Babrak Karmal, Khodaidad became the first officer from the Hazara people ever to achieve the rank of a general in the Afghan National Army.

While Khodaidad was commanding the 14th Infantry Division of Ghazni Province he played a major role in the Afghan governments National Reconciliation programme instigated by Najibullah. Khodaidad managed to convince several mujahideen factions, groups and individuals in the central and northeastern zones of the country to enter the reconciliation and reintegration process. He recalls his time of meeting and discussing with mujahideen leaders hence the reason why the central zones of Afghanistan witnessed peace and harmony in the late 1980s. Khodaidad had positive connections with local mujahideen leaders and commanders in areas under his sphere of influence including Wardak, Ghazni, Bamyan, Urazgan, Logar and parts of Paktia and Paktika provinces. He encouraged the various different mujahideen from various tribes to join the peace process and work towards the unity of Afghanistan. This included encouraging all the factions of the Hazara mujahideen to put their differences aside and work for the future of Afghanistan. As part of the reconciliation and reintegration process, Khodaidad created an operational group for all the tribes living in his area of responsibility namely Ghazni, Wardak and other areas in Central Afghanistan. The operational groups consisted of three infantry divisions, 95th Division for Ghazni, 96th Division for Wardak and Bamyan provinces and no 97th division for Mazar-i-Shariff province. In the meantime, he was commanding the operational group in these areas. His relations with mujahideen commanders in Takhar, Kunduz and Baghlan provinces was highly appreciated by the government as it added to improving the security and stability in areas under his responsibility.

After the collapse of Najibullah's government in 1992 and the beginning of civil unrest in Afghanistan, Khodaidad, on behalf of the Hazara people of Afghanistan, was appointed as the Minister of National Security during the prime government of Sibghatullah Mojaddedi.

As Afghanistan drifted to civil war, Khodaidad used his nonalignment by cooperating and supporting the United Nations peace process in achieving national unity and stability in Afghanistan. Khodaidad continued to keep his non-alliance remaining neutral and did not support any particular factions, groups or individuals. His main goal was to bring peace and security for Afghanistan. He tried to keep his good relationship with the people of Afghanistan both living in Afghanistan and outside. However, after the Taliban takeover of Afghanistan, he sought refuge in London until the fall of the Taliban regime. In 2001, after the U.S.-led invasion at the start of the War in Afghanistan, he was invited to his homeland by the international community to support the Afghan people to bring peace, security and national unity to the country. He became a member of the Emergency Loya Jirga of Afghanistan after the collapse of the Taliban regime.

In 2004, Khodaidad was appointed by Hamid Karzai as Deputy Minister of Counter Narcotics and Member of National Security Council of Afghanistan and shortly after receiving parliamentary approval in 2007, he became the Minister of Counter Narcotics until March 2010.

In 2006 he attended the Top Leadership Programme (TLP1) in Berlin, Germany organised by the commission for reform of public affairs and UNDP to strengthen good governance and leadership in Afghanistan.

As minister, known to his colleagues, Khodaidad showed commitment and dedication to his job. During his term, twenty, out of thirty-four, provinces of Afghanistan were announced as poppy-free by the U.N. Of the 203,000 hectares used for poppy cultivation, Khodaidad managed to reduce this to 123,000 hectares. As a part of his campaign to rid Afghanistan of drugs, Khodaidad travelled to all thirty-four Afghan provinces with his United Kingdom, United States and other international partners to volatile and dangerous provinces.

In President Karzai's cabinet, Khodaidad was amongst the few ministers who had maintained their nonalignment with any faction or party in Afghanistan. According to his colleagues and the international community, Khodaidad was renowned for being against corruption and has been described as a clean and transparent minister in the Karzai cabinet. As Phil Zabriskie, states in his article "Afghanistan's drug czar – world's toughest job", published in Fortune, Khodaidad "has earned one of the cleanest reputations in the Afghan civil service." Further, Tom Schweich, a former senior State Department counternarcotics official also speaks highly of Khodaidad as an individual without "any influence" from any tribes backing him, gunmen or mujahadeen lending him credibility. In addition, Khodaidad has no sway with any ethnic groups because he values his independence and non-alignment.

The former US Ambassador Karl Eikenberry and Francis J. Ricciardone, Jr., in a discussion on the "New Cabinet" in 2009 stated that Khodaidad "holds graduate degrees from the Indian National Defense Academy. … and he has been a very good partner for U.S. counternarcotics efforts."

In 2013 General Khodaidad was selected as the first vice president candidate to Hedayat Amin Arsala for the upcoming presidential elections of Afghanistan in 2014.

General Khodaidad was also a member of the consultative Loya Jirga (Grand Meeting) of Afghanistan to agree the Bilateral Security Agreement (BSA) between Afghanistan and the United States in November 2013.

Between 2017 and 2019 Khodaidad was appointed as the Inspector General and member of High Oversight Board (HOB) of the Afghan armed forces in the Office of the National Security Council, Afghanistan in the presidential palace.

=== Accolades ===
Khodaidad is honoured and perceived by the Afghan people, former colleagues including army officers and generals and many former mujahideen foes as a courageous and distinguished soldier who showed commitment and gallantry in the battlefield. He has received over fifty-two gallantry medals from the Afghan government.

During his time as the Minister of National Security (Afghanistan) and later as the Minister of Counter Narcotics (Afghanistan), Khodaidad was recognised by his colleagues as an Afghan patriot who consistently put aside ethnic differences as well encouraging national unity amongst ordinary Afghans.

== See also ==
- List of Hazara people
