= Soraya Rahim Sobhrang =

Afghan politician, physician and activist

- Dari: ثریا رحیم صبحرنگ
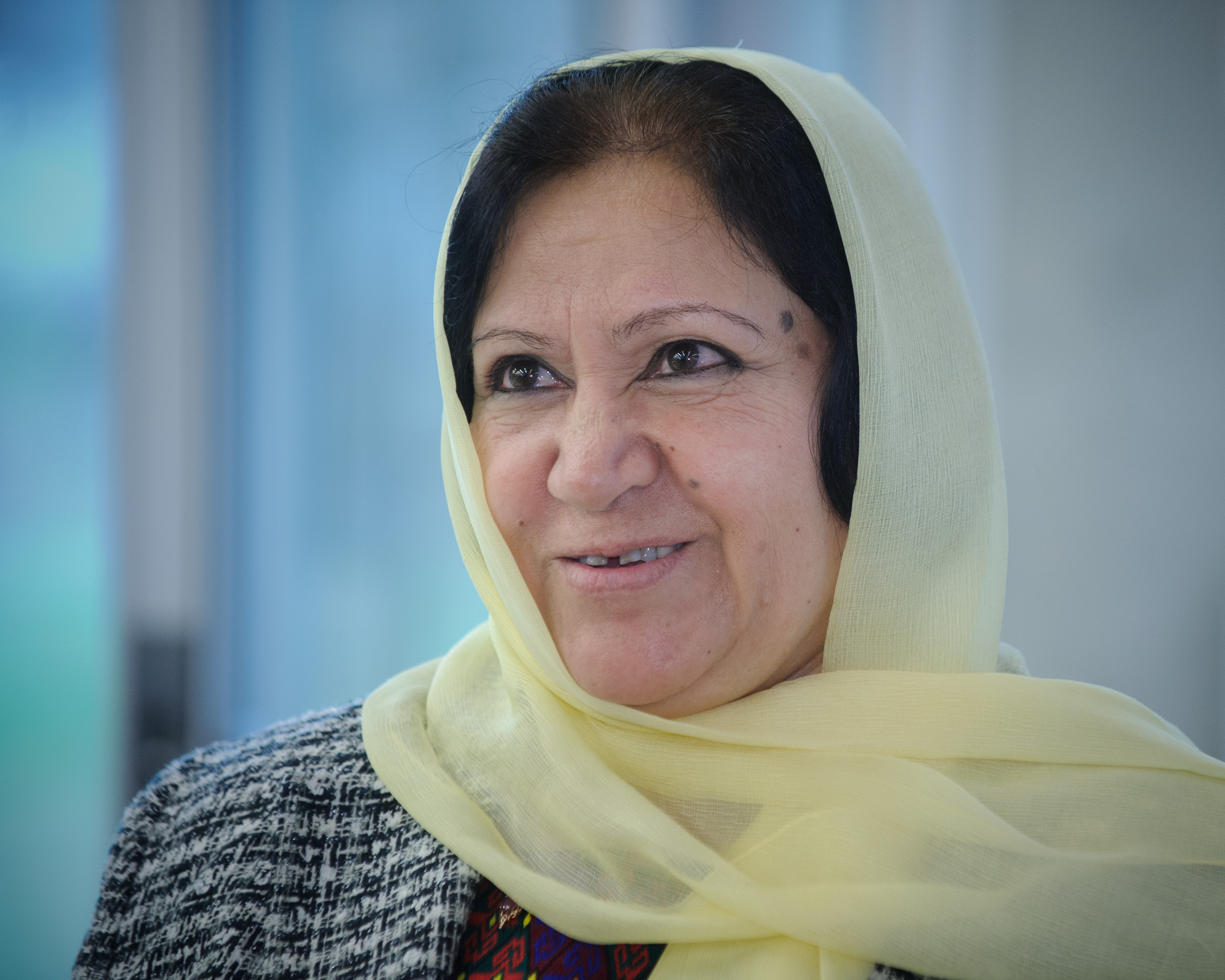
- Sobhrang in 2011
- Born: Herat, Afghanistan
- Education: Kabul University
- Awards: Front Line Award for Human Rights Defenders at Risk (2010)

Soraya Rahim Sobhrang (Dari: ثریا رحیم صبحرنگ) is an Afghan politician, physician, and human rights activist who has served as the commissioner of women's rights of the Afghan Independent Human Rights Commission.

Sobhrang was born in Herat and completed medical school at Kabul University. She later emigrated to Germany. Sobhrang returned to Afghanistan in 1981 to work as the technical and political deputy minister at the Ministry of Women's Affairs. In March 2006, she was named by president Hamid Karzai as the women's affairs minister but her candidacy was not approved by the House of the People. She received the 2010 Front Line Award for Human Rights Defenders at Risk.
