= Massouda Jalal =

Afghan presidential candidate

Dr Massouda Jalāl
- داکتر مسعوده جلال

First Woman Presidential Candidate, Minister of Women's Affairs of Afghanistan, Professor at the Kabul Medical University, UN Award Winner

Personal details
- Born: January 17, 1964 (age 62) Kapisa Province, Kingdom of Afghanistan
- Spouse: Faizullah Jalal
- Children: Hasina Jalal

Massouda Jalāl (Dari: مسعوده جلال) is the first woman in the history of Afghanistan who ran for the Office of the President of Afghanistan in 2002, 2004, and again in 2019. Dr. Jalāl emerged as a leading voice of Afghan women after her election as the Representative to the 2002 Loya Jirga (Grand Assembly) as she became one of the frontrunners for the position of Interim President of Afghanistan, opposite to ex-president Hamid Karzai.

Serving as the Minister of Women's Affairs (2004–2006) in the cabinet of government of Afghanistan and the head of the Commission for the Law on the Elimination of Violence against Women (EVAW), she left behind a string of legacies that includes the framework for the National Action Plan for the Women of Afghanistan (NAPWA), a ten-year plan for women to liberate Afghan women from poverty and promote their participation in public life.

Between 2001 and 2004, Dr. Jalāl also served as the only Afghan woman as the member of the Peace Delegation of Afghanistan. Before joining politics, she worked as a professor at the Kabul Medical University, and she has also worked in leadership positions in the UN World Food Programme, UNHCR, and the International Committee of the Red Cross in Afghanistan. She is fluent in Persian, Pashto, English, Dutch, and Hindi/Urdu and moderately fluent in French and German languages.

== Early life and education ==
Born to a middle-class family in Kapisa Province of Afghanistan, one of seven children, Jalāl moved to Kabul to attend high school. After scoring the second highest marks at the national level in the National College Entrance Exam of Afghanistan (Konkor), she attended the Kabul Medical University as a first generation high school and college student, where she later joined the faculty. Amidst raging war in the early 1990s, she and her academic colleagues founded the Human Rights Commission which reported human rights violations to the UN Special Envoy to Afghanistan. She was a member of the faculty in the Kabul Medical University until 1996, when the Taliban government had her removed. After her removal from the Kabul Medical University's faculty, she worked as a National Senior Program Officer and Head of Women's Department for United Nations-World Food Programme (UN-WFP), Consultant to the International Committee of the Red Cross, and Senior Program Officer for the United Nations' Commissioner for Refugees (UNHCR). Under the Taliban rule, her efforts for women and girls' right to education and work led her to get arrested for political reasons. She was released from prison through United Nation Headquarter's intervention. Her husband, Professor Dr. Faizullah Jalāl, has been a professor of law and political science at Kabul University for the past 30 years and they have three children. Taliban security service officers arrested Professor Faizullah Jalāl on 8 January 2022 for his alleged role in criticizing Taliban government on social media.

== Political career ==
Jalāl was elected as a Representative of her Kabul neighborhood to the 2002 Emergency Loya Jirga (Grand Assembly) of Afghanistan. In 2002, when she ran for the Office of the President in the Interim Government of Afghanistan, she was placed into consideration to lead Afghanistan as Interim President, but she was finally placed a second to ex-president of Afghanistan Hamid Karzai. She turned down the offer to become ex-President Hamid Karzai's first Vice President in exchange for the withdrawal of her candidacy.

In 2003, Jalāl was again elected from Kabul to the Constitutional Loya Jirga (Grand Assembly) of Afghanistan. During the drafting of the Constitution of Afghanistan, she worked with fellow women delegates to lobby for the inclusion of women and human rights provisions, including Article 22; Article 53, Section 2; Article 44; Article 54, Section 2; and Articles 83 and 84. During the Constitutional debates on whether Afghan women should be given the right to vote and run as a candidate for high positions in government, her experience in running as a presidential candidate was used as reference by the supporters, citing that she had already practiced that right. By running as presidential candidate, she had already set the benchmark on the highest level of position in which Afghan women should be allowed to compete. This gist of the debate was reflected in the documentation of the Constitutional Commission and was covered by media.

Dr Massouda Jalāl run again for the Office of the President of Afghanistan as the only woman candidate in the 2004 Afghan presidential election. In 2004 election, Jalāl was placed 6th among 17 male candidates. From 2001 – 2004. She was the only Afghan woman who was part of the delegation of Afghanistan during the peace negotiations. In this role, she actively participated in formal peace negotiations.

Serving as the Minister of Women's Affairs (2004–2006) in the cabinet of government of Afghanistan and the head of the Commission for the Law on the Elimination of Violence against Women (EVAW), she left behind a string of legacies that includes the framework for the National Action Plan for the Women of Afghanistan (NAPWA), a ten-year plan for women to liberate Afghan women from poverty and promote their participation in public life. She was also Head of the Commission for the Law on the Elimination of Violence against Women (EVAW), which was also adopted later as a decree to liberate Afghan women from fear, violence and oppression. During her time as the Minister of Women's Affairs she travelled to all provinces of Afghanistan. During one of her official trips to the Takhar province of Afghanistan, her convoy was targeted and bombed, leaving two of her guards severely injured. Her efforts to strive to promote human rights, women rights, equality, justice and peace during her work as the Minister of Women's Affairs are published in two books.

Furthermore, "Frontrunner: The Afghan Woman Who Surprised the World" is a documentary made on her. It is the heroic story of the first woman to run for President of Afghanistan. Although she ultimately lost the election to ex-president Hamid Karzai, her courageous campaign opened the door for over 550 women to run for Parliament just a few months later.

== Civil Society Activism ==
Ever since she left working for the government of Afghanistan in 2006, she has been engaged in human rights, civil society, social, and political activism. She is the founder of Jalāl Foundation, a non-profit, non-government organization that brings together women's councils and organizations to build women's capacity, protect women's rights, promote women's political participation, and bring the voices of women in international fora. Dr. Massouda Jalāl has also founded the Freedom Message Weekly Newspaper—an activist tabloid that exposed the abuses of women's right and human rights and promoted democracy and freedom of expression in Afghanistan. In these capacities she has traveled to more than 50 countries of the world to represent Afghan women and raise their voices in the international platforms. She is also the founder and co-founder of multiple women's organizations and networks in Afghanistan and the region.

In 2010, gunmen attacked two Jalāl Foundation women's rights activists in Helmand when they were on an official trip, killing one and putting the other in a coma. The attack forced Dr. Jalāl to halt her travels. More recently, during her third run for the Office of President in 2019, Dr Jalāl boldly critiqued extremism and the violations of human rights and women's rights in the national and international media. This resulted in several attacks on her and her family members, including her house and office were bombed by the enemies of peace and democracy. After the fall of Kabul in August 2021, Jalāl was forced to go into exile to the Netherlands.

== Awards and honors ==
Her tireless efforts and activism have been recognized and appreciated by many international awards and honors. She has received the following awards:

- Human Rights Global Prize of the United Nations;
- Women Excellence Award, SAARC Chamber Women Entrepreneurs' Council (SCWEC), 2010.
- Awardee, Center for Development and Population Activities (CEDPA)
- Leadership Award for Outstanding Contribution to Women Upliftment Award from the World CSR Congress;
- Awardee, Outstanding Visionary Women Leadership Award from the World Women Leadership Congress, WWLCA, 2014
- Awardee, International Human Rights and Law Group
- Nominee, ASHOKA Fellowship Award
- Nominee, Tulip Prize Award, 2012 and 2011
- Topped the 1981 Scholarship Contest of Kapisa province at the provincial level.
- Ranked second in the 1981 National College Entrance Exam of Afghanistan (Kankor) at the national level.
- The 2025 International Women's Rights Award will be presented to Massouda Jalal and her daughter Husna Jalal, two Afghan political activists, at the 17th Geneva Summit for Human Rights and Democracy, 2025.

She is the author of several publications, the latest of which is a book entitled "Hanging by the Thread: Afghan Women's Rights and Security Threats", an articulation of her perspectives in the country's peace and political processes. Her past writings and activism include many articles and interviews on Afghan democracy, rule of law, women's rights and violence against women both in Persian and English, many of which were published in the local media and international press.
