= Constitutional Loya Jirga =

Afghan leaders who met at the December 2001 Bonn Conference which picked Hamid Karzai to lead the Afghan Transitional Authority also agreed that a Constitutional Loya Jirga should be convened to draft a new constitution.

The Emergency Loya Jirga of 2002 set up an Afghan Constitutional Commission, of 35 members, which sat from October 2002 until March 2003, prior to submitting their draft to President Karzai. That draft was made public in November 2003.

502 delegates were selected, via regional caucuses, to participate in the Constitutional Loya Jirga to debate, amend the draft. In her thesis at the Naval Postgraduate School Zoe Sherman described the composition of the Constitutional Loya Jirga of 2002 as being unlike any previous Loya Jirga.

Ten committees were formed, each assigned to review specific articles. The Constitutional Loya Jirga sat from December 13, 2003, to January 4, 2004.

== Committee One: 45 articles, chaired by Ustad Rabani ==
Committee One: 45 articles, chaired by Ustad Rabani
honorific	name	location
Mawlawi	Abdurrahman	Badakhshan Province
	Aborrashid Eshraqi	Badakhshan
Dr	Anis Gol Akhgar	Badakhshan
Prof	Burhanoddin Rabbani	Badakhshan
	Abdul Qasim	Kapisa
	Ghawsoddin	Samangan
	Mohammad Akram Sharafat	Laghman
	Padshah	Zabul
	Mohammad Esmael Saifi	Nimroz
	Mohammad Azam Dadfar	Jowzjan
	Sajjad Mohseni	Bamyan
	Abdul Wahed	Parwan
Hajji	Mohammad Sadeq	Urozgan
Hajji	Abdul Qayum	Konduz
Hajji	Marhaba	Ghazni Province
	Mohammad Usman Tariq	Logar
	Bashir Ahmad Logar
	Mohammad Rafiq	Faryab
	Aqa Karim Watanyar	Faryab
Hajji	Mohammad Musa	Farah
	Mir Abdurrahan	Takhar
	Mohammad Ashraf	Balkh
	Sayd Nasruddin Mohseni	Balkh
Hajji	Shahzada	Helmand
	Mohammad Eshaq	Paktika
	Hafizollah	Baghlan
Eng	Abdul Ghaws	Nangarhar
	Dawlat Khan	Herat
	Mohammad Daud	Herat
Hajji	Nurollah Khan Tokhi	Kandahar
	Mohammad Yunos Nurzai	Kandahar
Dr	Hayatollah	Kandahar
	Abdul Munir Danesh	Kabul Province
	Shakila	Kabul Province
	Abdul Satar	Kabul Province
	Jafar Rasuli	Bamyan
Hajji	Dost Mohammad
	Sayd Naser Naderi	Baghan
	Abdul Hakim Spin	Farah
	Kabir Marzban	Takhar
	Aryan Yun	Nangarhar
	Tahera	Daikondi, Urozgan
	Sima Joyonda	Ghor
	Malali Joya	Farah
	Gholam Faruq Majroh	Herat
	Shahla
	Abdul Qader
	Shaheda
	Bibi Saheba
	Bibi Amena

== Committee Two: 27 articles, chaired by Ustad Sayaf ==
Committee Two: 27 articles, chaired by Ustad Sayaf
honorific	name	location
	Abdul Wali Niazi	Badakhshan
	Ahmad Hosayn Deneshyar	Ghowr
	Khwaja Gholam Ghaws	Kapisa
	Amir Mohammad	Samangan
	Sultan Mohammad	Zabul
Prof	Abdurrab Rasul Sayyaf
	Amir Hamza	Nuristan
	Amanollah	Nimroz
	Mohammad Omar Makhdum	Jowzjan
	Mohammad Daud	Bamian
	Mir Hamidollah	Parwan
	Abdul Qayum Karzai	Urozgan
Qari	Rahmatollah	Konduz
	Sediq Chakari	Kabul Province
	Khodadad Erfani	Ghazni
	Abdul Hafiz Mansur	Kabul Province
	Abdul Ghani	Ghazni
Dr	Asadollah	Logar
	Abdul Ahad	Faryab
	Sardar Elmrad Arghon	Faryab
	Gholam Mahyoddin	Farah
Eng	Abdullah	Takhar
	Mohammad Gol Yunosi	Balkh
	Sayd Ebrar	Balkh
	Hafizollah Haqyar	Helmand
	Mohammad Anwar Eshaqzai	Helmand
	Daud Shah	Paktika
	Abdul Jalil	Baghlan
	Sayd Jamal	Nangarhar
Hajji	Daud Arsalaiee	Nangarhar
	Hamayun Shinwari	Nangarhar
	Abdul Zaher Alizai	Herat
Hajji	Ali Badshah	Khost
Eng	Abdul Salam	Kandahar
	Obaidollah Obaid	Kabul Province
	Fazl Karim Aimaq	Kabul Province
	Sayd Anwar Rahmati	Kabul Province
	Gholam Rabani Nasher	Kabul Province
Mawlawi	Nazar Mohammad	Kabul Province
	Mastura Stanekzai	Logar
Hajji	Hayatollah
Mawlawi	Khodaidad	Herat
	Abdullatif Jalali	Ghazni
	Nadera Wardak	Maidan Wardag
	Masuda Ahmadi
	Sharifa Azimi
	Soraya Ahadi
	Wazir Bai
	Tabiba Taheri
	Nafas Gol Khedmat	Farah

== Committee Three: 21 articles, chaired by Ahmad Nabi Muhammadi ==
Committee Three: 21 articles, chaired by Ahmad Nabi Muhammadi
honorific	name	location
	Nazri Mohammad Niromand	Badakhshan
	Fazl Ahmad	Ghowr
	Abdul Wahab	Kapisa
	Azizollah Rozi	Samangan
Hajji	Gholam Saifollah	Zabol
	Ahmad Nabi Mohammadi	Logar
	Mohammad Tamim Nuristani	Nurestan
	Faizollah Zaki	Jowzjan
	Abdulhai Ashir	Jowzjan
	Ali Mohammad	Bamian
Hajji	Khair Mohammad	Sar-e Pol
	Abdul Hakim Nurzai	Urozgan
	Shafiqa	Konduz
	Abdul Hakim	Ghazni
Mawlawi	Shahzada Shahed	Khas Konar
	Faizollah Qadri	Fariab
	Tajoddin	Takhar
	Mohammad Yaqub	Takhar
	Omarqul	Balkh
	Abdul Hadi	Helmand
	Sayd Omar	Helmand
	Mir Mohammad Agha	Baghlan
	Khalil Ahmad	Baghlan
	Malek Qais	Nangarhar
Hajji	Abdurraof Mokhles	Herat
	Ebrahim Koshki	Herat
Hajji	Besmellah Gol	Khost
	Khaled Ahmad Pashtun	Kandahar
Dr	Samiollah	Kabul Province
Hajji	Nazar Mohammad	Kabul Province
	Mohammad Alem Anis	Kabul Province
	Ustad Saifi	Kabul Province
	Mohammad Rauf Mehdi	Kabul Province
Hajji	Gol Ahmadzai	Afghan refugees in Pakistan
	Mohammad Esmael Qasemyar	Ghazni
Gen	Abdurrashid Dostum	Maymana
	Saifora Niazi	Balkh
	Mohammad Gol Kochai	Ghazni
	Nasima	No province
	Adam Khan	No Province
	Nasifa Nasif	Maidan Wardag
Mawlawi	Halim Jan
	Golalalai
	Abdul Jabar Naimi
	Zarghona
	Momena Yarui
	Simin
	Samea
	Mohammad Ehsan Fayaz
	Shirin Mohseni
	Zakia

== Committee Four: 38 articles, chaired by Mohammad Tahir ==
Committee Four: 38 articles, chaired by Mohammad Tahir
honorific	name	location
	Dawlat Mohammad Jawshan	Badakhshan
	Kamaloddin	Ghowr
	Eslamoddin Mangal	Paktia
	Abdurrauf	Samangan
Dr	Abdullah	Laghman
Hajji	Nazar	Zabol
	Suleman Hamed	Badghis
	Mohammad Esmael	Jowzjan
Eng	Ahmad	Jowzjan
	Ahmad Salangi instead [sic] Abdul Satar	Parwan
	Ustad Mohammad Asef	Parwan
	Sayd Hasan Safaee	Sar-e Pol
Dr	Abdullah	Urozgan
	Salem Bakhtyar	Konduz
	Mohammad Sunzur	Ghazni
Qazi	Abdul Satar	Konar
	Mohammad Hasan Kohzad	Fariab
	Gholam Rabani	Takhar
	Zaidollah	Maidan Wardag
	Gholam Faruq	Balkh
	Jan Mohammad	Balkh
	Abdul Ahad	Helmand
	Nader Khan Katawazi	Paktika
	Amroddin	Baghlan
Hajji	Mirwais	Nangarhar
Eng	Abdul Ghafar	Nangarhar
	Socha Gol	Nangarhar
	Mohammad Rafiq Shahir	Herat
	Nazir Ahmad	Herat
	Mohammad Taher	Khost
	Abdul Salam	Kandahar
	Abdul Shkur Waqef Hakimi	Kabul Province
	Habiba	Kabul Province
	Gholam Rabani Formoli	Kabul Province
Mollah	Ezatollah	Kabul Province
	Sayd Abdul Qayum Sajadi	Ghazni
	Golalali Jabarkhel	Afghan refugees in Pakistan
	Mohammad Asef
	Sayd Hasan Safavi
Dr	Abdullah
	Nosh Afarin	Ghowr
Dr	Arefa
	Masuda Karokhi
Eng	Maliha
	Sher Ahmad
	Halima Ghazal
	Zia Kakar	Laghman
	Hasina
	Nasrollah Khan

== Committee Five: 35 articles, chaired by Ayatullah Muhsini ==
Committee Five: 35 articles, chaired by Ayatullah Muhsini
honorific	name	location
	Amanollah Paiman	Badakhshan
	Atta Mohammad	Ghowr
	Anwar Khan	Paktia
	Hakamoddin	Samangan
Ayatollah	Mohammad Asef Mohseni
	Mohammad Shah Shafiq
Mowlawi	Abdul Hanan	Nurestan
	Jamahir Mohammad	Jowzjan
Pir	Sayd Ahmad Gelani
	Gholam Yahya	Parwan
	Jawad Saadat	Sar-e Pol
	Sayd Mohammad	Urozgan
Eng	Mohammad Khan	Konduz
	Mir Abdullah Alemi	Ghazni
Hajji	Misl Khan	Konar
Dr	Ezatollah	Fariab
	Abdul Khair	Takhar
	Torbor Ghotak	Maidan Wardag
Hajji	Mohammad Musa Hotak	Maidan Wardag
Dr	Mehyoddin Mehdi	Kabul Province
	Sher Mohammad Majlesi	Balkh
	Khwaja Sher Padshah Qeyam	Kabul Province
	Abdul Qayum	Balkh
Hajji	Abdul Qader	Helmand
Hajji	Mahmud	Paktika
	Mohammad Yunos	Baghlan
	Amanollah	Nangarhar
	Faridol Khan	Nangarhar
	Mohammad Saleh Saljoqi	Herat
	Sayd Mohammad Hosayn Hosayni	Herat
	Khaki Jan	Khost
Hajji	Mohammad Mokhtar	Kandahar
	Mohammad Shoaib	Kabul Province
	Ahmad Shah	Kabul Province
	Sher Alam Bahador	Kabul Province
	Moslema	Kabul Province
	Ahmad Shah Ahmadzai	Kabul Province
	Gholam Reza	Kabul Province
	Amanollah Hamraiee	Takhar
Hajji	Mohammad Rasul	Jowzjan
	Dawajan Kochai
	Najia Zarah
	Ali Ghazal Kohi
	Rahela Jama.
	Nafisa Sadeqi
	Hasina Mokhles
	Hayat Bibi
	Qamar
	Mohammad Zaman

== Committee Six: 22 articles, chaired by Maulowi Gul Muhammad ==
Committee Six: 22 articles, chaired by Maulowi Gul Muhammad.
honorific	name	location
	Abdul Basir Eshrat	Badakhshan
	Abdullah Rahimi	Ghowr
Dr	Wali Mohammad	Paktia
	Asadollah	Laghman
	Habibollah Zowran	Badghis
	Hazrat Sebghatollah Mojadedi	Kabul Province
	Mohammad Malik	Nurestan
	Gol Ahmad Paiman	Sheberghan
Hajji	Mohammad	Parwan
Mawlawi	Mohammad Akbar	Sar-e Pol
	Gholam Hosayn Shafaq	Sar-e Pol
	Mohammad Amin	Konduz
	Khan Shirini	Konduz
Mowlawi	Gol Mohammad Khan	Ghazni
	Mohammad Naim	Ghazni
	Mohammad Aslam	Khas Konar
	Norullah Musib	Fariab
	Mohammad Hasan	Takhar
	Mohammad Daud Ghairat	Maidan Wardag
	Mohammad Yaqub	Balkh
Hajji	Abdul Ghafur	Balkh
Hajji	Nazar Gul	Paktika
Hajji	Abdul Ghafar	Baghlan
	Abdullah	Nangarhar
	Mohammad Zaher Khan	Nangarhar
	Abdul Ghani Mawlawi Zada	Herat
	Sediqollah	Khost
	Ahmad Wali Achekzai	Kandahar
	Masuda Jalal	Kabul Province
Hajji	Mohammad Hashem Mehdi	Kabul Province
Sheikh	Mohammad Ebrabhim Mohseni	Kabul Province
	Dost Mohammad	Kabul Province
Dr	Ahmad Shah Farhat	Kandahar
	Mari Rokhshani	Nimroz
	Amanollah Khan Naseri	Zabol
	Sahera Sharif
	Mohad Taye
	Nuria Wesal
	Moslema
	Habiba
	Hawa Nuri
	Fatema
	Mahbuba
	Saleha
	Mohammad Wais
	Chrik Singham
	Jamila Mojahed
	Nazanin Jabar Khel
	Safia

== Committee Seven: 40 articles, chaired by Dr. Mashahed ==
Committee Seven: 40 articles, chaired by Dr. Mashahed
honorific	name	location
	Abdul Wahab	Badakhshan
	Mohammad	Ghowr
	Mamur Fazl Rahman	Paktia
	Mokaram Khan	Laghman
	Gholam Rasul	Badghis
	Mohammad Saleh Rasekh	Jowzjan
	Mohammad Tawus	Parwan
	Mohammad Nabi Sadri	Sar-e Pol
	Sayd Faruq Omar	Konduz
	Mohammad Akbari
	Mohammad Amin	Konduz
	Mohammad Taher	Ghazni
	Mohammad Rahim	Konar
	Temor Shah Faizi	Farah
	Mohammad Sarwar Osmani	Farah
	Mir Mohammad Wali	Takhar
	Amanollah	Maidan Wardag
	Mohammad Rasul Ahmadi	Balkh
	Abdul Ghani)	Balkh
	Saifol Maluk	Helmand
	Mohammad Nawab	Paktika
	Mohebollah	Baghlan
Hajji	Mohammad Daud	Nangarhar
	Gol Mohammad	Nangarhar
	Rohol Amin Sher	Nangarhar
	Abdullah Mawlawi Zada	Herat
Hajji	Raz Mohammad	Khost
	Mohammad Akbar Marufi	Kandahar
	Razia Naimi	Kabul Province
	Gholam Daud	Kabul Province
	Nurollah	Kabul Province
Dr	Mohammad Wahid Binesh	Kabul Province
	Padshah Mir	Afghan refugees in Pakistan
Hajji	Khair Mohammad Eshaqzai	Sar-e Pol
	Wali Mohammad	Helmand
Dr	Moshaher	Takhar
	Moslema	Badakhshan
	Sara Sorkhabi	Fariab
	Rahima	Baghlan
	Zeb Nesa	Takhar
	Maria Sazawar	Balkh
	Hanifa Aminpor	Aybak
	Homaira Golshani	Sar-e Pol
	Safia Sediqi
Dr	Khadija	Paktika
	Fawzia	Bamian
	Farida	Nimroz
	Samiolhaq	Representative of the disabled
	Mohammad Ihsan Fayaz	Representative of the disabled

== Committee Eight: 46 articles, chaired by Ustad Farid ==
Committee Eight: 46 articles, chaired by Ustad Farid
honorific	name	location
Dr	Abdul Wodud	Badakhshan
	Abdul Aziz	Ghowr
	Zinolabedin Farid	Kapisa
	Mamur Abdurrahman	Paktia
	Qazi Abdul Jabar	Laghman
Hajji	Mohammad Anwar	Badghis
	Mohammad Omar	Nimroz
	Ali Jan Jamal	Ghazni
	Allah Berdi	Jowzjan
	Mohammad Sadeq Aliyar	Bamian
	Mohammad Sarwar Jawadi	Bamian
	Yar Mohammad	Parwan
	Faizollah Faiaz	Sar-e Pol
	Abdul Qader Adalat Khwah	Konduz
	Ahmad Wali Masud
Mowlana	Abdurrahman	Ghazni
	Mohebollah Samim	Ghazni
Hajji	Sayd Ahmad	Konar
	Mohammad Tareq	Fariab
	Abdul Samad Sediqi	Farah
	Abdul Motaleb	Takhar
Hajji	Nek Mohammad Shah Nuri	Maidan Wardag
	Gholam Hosayn	Balkh
	Sado Khan	Helmand
	Aref Khan	Paktika
	Abdul Karim	Baghlan
	Malek Nazir	Nangarhar
Hajji	Rohollah	Nangarhar
Hajji	Shahpur	Nangarhar
	Ahmad Shah Shahrukhi	Herat
	Mohammad Sayd	Herat
	Azizollah Wasefi	Kandahar
	Ahmad Wali Karzai	Kandahar
Hajji	Ahmad Shah	Kandahar
	Yar Mohammad	Kabul Province
	Sultan Mohammad	Kabul Province
	Sher Shah	Kabul Province
	Fetema Fatemi	Kandahar
	Fazl Rahman	Afghan refugees in Kohat, a place in Pakistan
	Wali Mohammad	Paktika
	Khatib Saheb	Konduz

== Committee Nine: 36 articles, chaired by Hashmat Ghani Ahmadzai ==
Committee Nine: 36 articles, chaired by Hashmat Ghani Ahmadzai
honorific	name	location
	Wali Hotak	Kandahar
	Mohammad Baqer Sheikh Zada	Kabul Province
Hajji	Bedar	Kabul Province
	Hafizollah Nurestani	Kabul Province
	Sayd Golab Wadan	Kabul Province
Hajji	Janat Gol	Kabul Province
	Sediqa Mobarez	Maidan Wardag
	Abdul Naser Shafiq	Afghan refugees in Pakistan
	Sardar Abdul Wali Khan
Hajji	Mohammad Sediq Kochi
	Rangina
	Habiba Wahaj
	Piri Gol	Badakhshan
	Nader Hayat Borhani	Samangan
	Halima
	Soraya Paikan
	Sharifa
	Sadozai
	Soraya Parlika
	Hashmat Ghani Ahmadzai

== Committee Ten: 29 articles, chaired by Maulowi Syd Muhammad Hanif ==
Committee Ten: 29 articles, chaired by Maulowi Syd Muhammad Hanif
honorific	name	location
Hajji	Abdurrahman	Badakhshan
	Nasrollah Sadeqi Zada	Urozgan
	Mohammad Eqbal	Kapisa
	Abdol Hakim Monib	Paktia
	Joma Dar	Paktia
	Qeyamoddin Kashaf	Laghman
Hajji	Abdullah	Zabol
	Abdurrahman Wafa	Bamian
Mowlawi	Mohammad Shah	Parwan
	Naqibollah	Urozgan
	Asadollah Omar Khel	Konduz
	Yusof Waezi	No place mentioned
	Sayd Mohammad	Logar
Hajji	Amanat Khan	Konar
	Hedayatollah Hedayat	Fariab
	Mohammad Alam	Farah
Mowlawi	Ahmadollah	Takhar
Hajji	Ahmad	Takhar
	Mohammad Mehdi Tawana	Balkh
	Abdul Qodus Qate	Balkh
	Gholam Dastagir	Balkh
Hajji	Atiqollah	Helmand
Dr	Eid Mohammad	Paktika
Mollah	Mohammad Wali	Baghlan
Hajji	Sayd Azim	Nangarhar
	Sayd Abdul Ghafar	Nangarhar
Hajji	Shahzada	Nangarhar
	Abdul Hadi	Herat
	Sayd Abdurrahman	Herat
Dr	Mohammad Usman	Kandahar
	Abdul Latif Amiri	Kandahar
	Abdul Kabir Ranjbar	Kabul Province
Mowlawi	Abdul Wakil	Kabul Province
Dr	Reza Zaki	Kabul Province
	Basir Ahmad Sediqi	Kabul Province
	Alemi Kermani	Ghowr
	Sayd Mohammad Ali Sadr	Representative of Afghan refugees in Islamabad.
Dr	Mohammad Akbar Popal	Konduz
	Habibollah Ghaleb	Balkh
	Palwasha Hasan	Kabul Province
	Mah Gol Ahmadi
	Kobra Dehqan
Dr	Farida	Nader Shah Kot
	Perdesa
	Fereshta	Kandahar
	Anahita Ada	Kolangar, Logar
	Fowzia Hotak
	Taher	Jamal Agha
