= Lodin =

Lodin may refer to:

- Lodín, a municipality and village in the Czech Republic
- Ludin, a tribe in Afghanistan and Pakistan

== People ==
- Azizullah Lodin (1939–2015), Afghan politician
- Björn Lodin (born 1965), Swedish singer
- Saif Lodin (born 1988), Afghan social activist
- Viktor Lodin (born 1999), Swedish ice hockey player
