= Fereshteh =

Fereshteh or Ferishteh or Freshteh or Freshte (Persian: فرشته fereshteh/fereshtah) is a feminine given name of Persian origin meaning angel, one of the most popular names in the Persian-speaking world. It is also transliterated as Freshteh or Fereshta or Farishta or Freshta in other languages like Hindi, Urdu, Bengali and Dari along with Persian.

The etymology of the word is traced to Sanskrit preṣyatā प्रेष्यता and Avestan fraēšta-, messenger which led to Persian فرشته • ferešte.

For phonological reasons, it is usually transcribed as Fereshtah or Freshte in the Persian spoken in Afghanistan and Tajikistan.

== People ==
- Firishta (1560-1620), (male) Persian historian
- Fereshteh Jenabi (1948-1998), Iranian actress
- Fereshta Kazemi (born 1979), Afghan–American film actress
- Fereshta Ludin, German teacher of Afghan descent.
- Fereshteh Ghazi, Iranian journalist
- Fereshteh Molavi (born 1953), Iranian-Canadian fiction writer and essayist
- Fereshteh Sadre Orafaee (born 1962), Iranian actress
- Fereshteh Taerpour (born 1953), Iranian film producer
- Fereshteh Forough Afghan computer scientist
- Freshta Kohistani, Afghan rights activist

== Places ==
- Fereshteh Jan, village in Juyom Rural District, Juyom District, Larestan County, Fars Province, Iran

== Film ==
- Farishta (1958 film)
- Farishta (2023 film)
