= Ludin (surname) =

Ludin is a surname. Notable people with the surname include:

- Atiqullah Ludin, Afghan politician
- Fereshta Ludin (born 1972), German-Afghan teacher
- Hanns Ludin (1905–1947), German diplomat
- Jawed Ludin (born 1973), Afghan politician
- Malte Ludin (born 1942), German filmmaker
- Walter Ludin (1908–1964), Swiss coxswain

== See also ==
- Ludin, an Afghan tribe
- Ludins, a surname
