= Fereshta =

Fereshta is a given name. Notable people with the name include:

- Fereshta Kazemi (fl. 2009), American actress
- Fereshta Ludin (born 1972), German teacher
