= Ludins =

Ludins is a surname. Notable people with the surname include:

- Eugene Ludins (1904–1996), American painter and academic
- Ryah Ludins (1896–1957), American muralist, painter and printmaker

== See also ==
- Ludin (surname)
