= John A. Knudsen =

American artist (1938–2014)

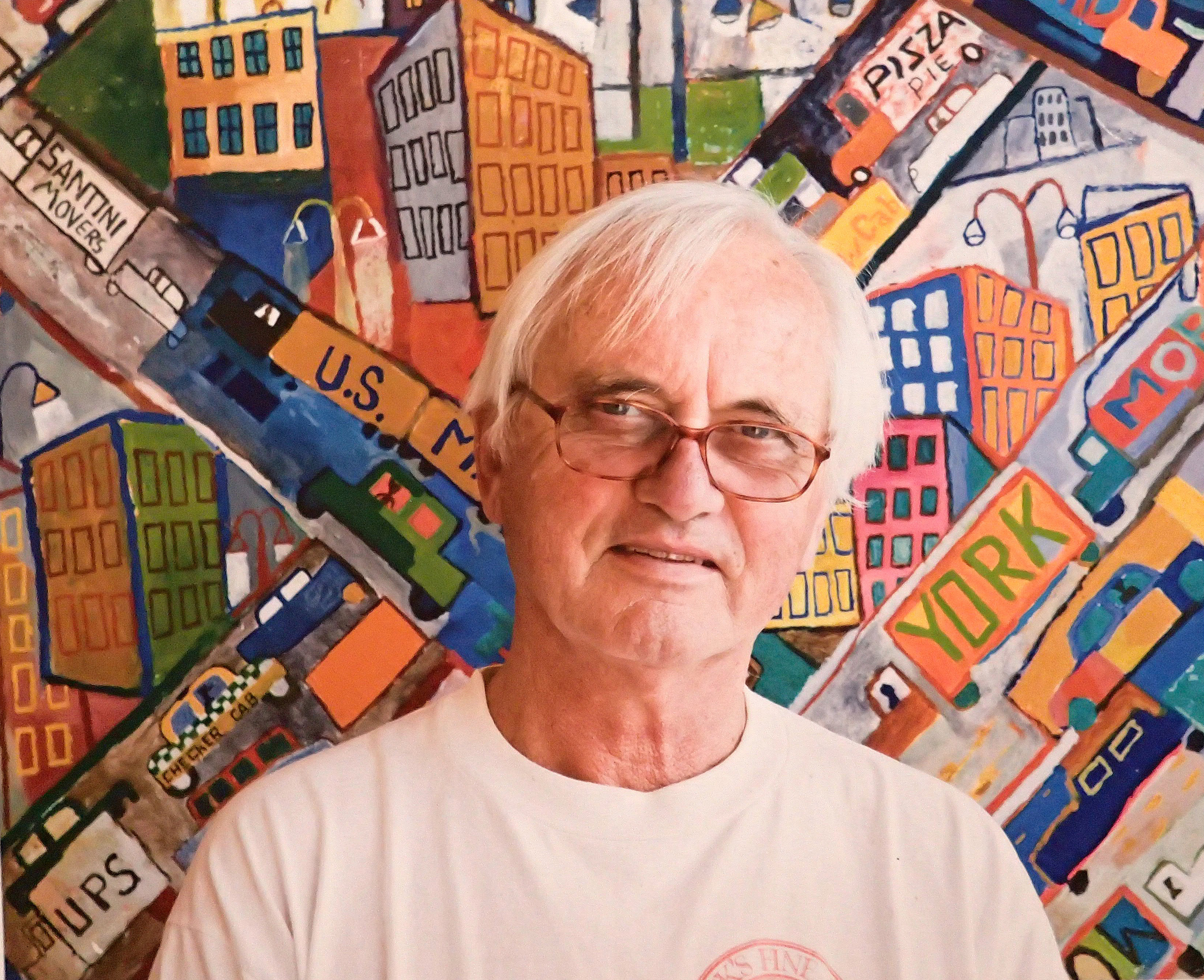
John A. Knudsen, Artist and Educator, 2008

John A. Knudsen (February 3, 1938 - March 13, 2014) was an American artist and educator known for his advanced techniques in intaglio printmaking and exploration of color through large oil paintings that focused primarily on Chicago cityscapes. He was one of the founding professors of Harper College (also known as William Rainey Harper College) and developed the Fine Arts Department curriculum and direction.

== Early years ==
Knudsen was born in 1938 and spent part of his upbringing in Brooklyn, New York; Michigan, and Chicago, Illinois. His father was a Lutheran minister. During high school, his family moved to the west side of Chicago in the Austin neighborhood where he later became the sole recipient in the city of a full scholarship to The School of the Art Institute of Chicago. Ultimately, his father, Arthur Knudsen, encouraged him to attend Luther College in Iowa.

== Education ==
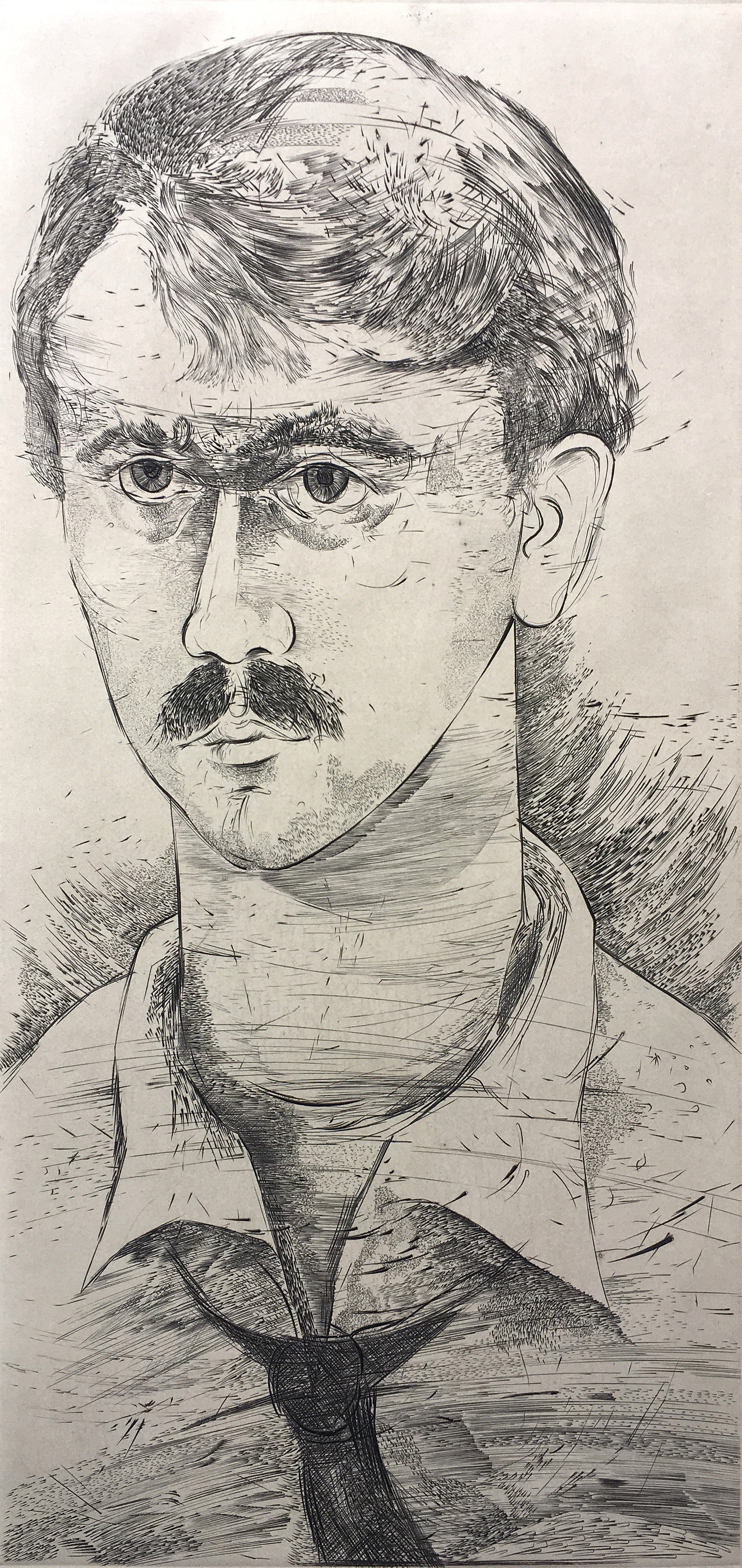
Self portrait engraving of the artist John A. Knudsen created in 1967 with image size of 7.5" x 15.5". This print demonstrates the influence of Maricio Lazanski.

While at Luther College, Knudsen earned a BFA with a Major in Fine Arts and Minors in History and Secondary Education. One of Knudsen's professors was Orville Running, who would become a big influence on his work.

After Luther College, Knudsen attended the University of Iowa where he double majored in Painting and Printmaking with a minor in Art History. He was taught by world-renowned professors such as Eugene Ludins for painting and Mauricio Lasansky, the latter of which spurred Knudsen's interest in engraving. Knudsen graduated in 1962 with a Master of Fine Arts in Printmaking and Painting as well as a minor in Art History.

== Career ==
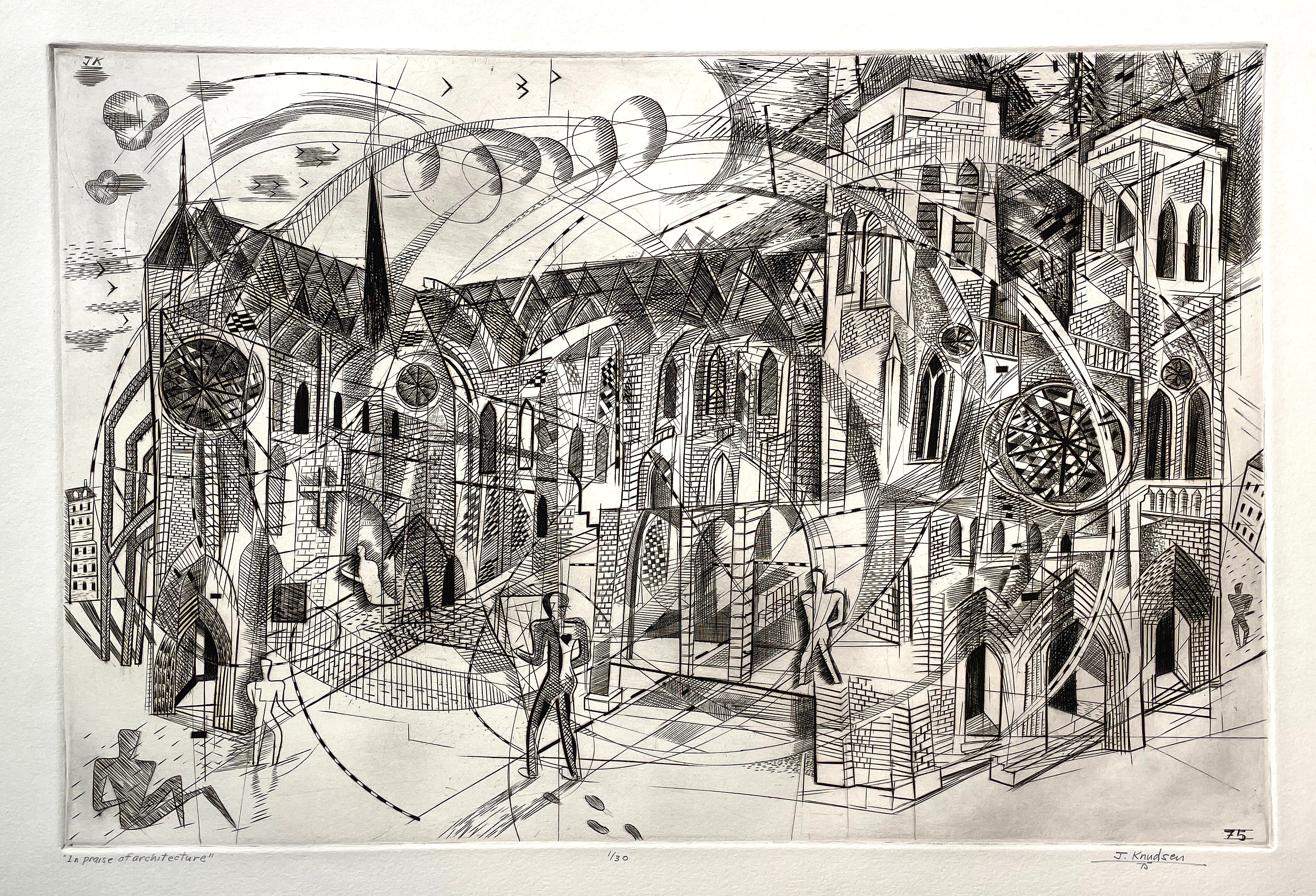
"In Praise of Architecture" 1975, 12" x 18" image size engraving represents a shift in style with a strong influence of Stanley William Hayter.

After graduate school, Knudsen worked as an elementary school art teacher from 1962 to 1963 at West Elementary School in New Canaan, Connecticut. In 1963, he returned to the Chicago area and taught art at Mount Prospect High School until 1967.

In 1967, Knudsen was one of the first professors hired to the newly established William Rainey Harper College. He proved instrumental in developing the college's first Fine Arts Program, working with William Foust, an art professor, in putting together the basic structure and curriculum of the program. Knudsen taught drawing, Design, Painting, Printmaking, and Life Drawing. He was also the co-head of the Fine Art Department from the start of the college in 1965 until 1972 with Foust. In the late 1960s, funding was provided to begin establishing the Harper College Art Collection. The goal was to improve the aesthetics of the building and to create a collection that would be added to through the years.

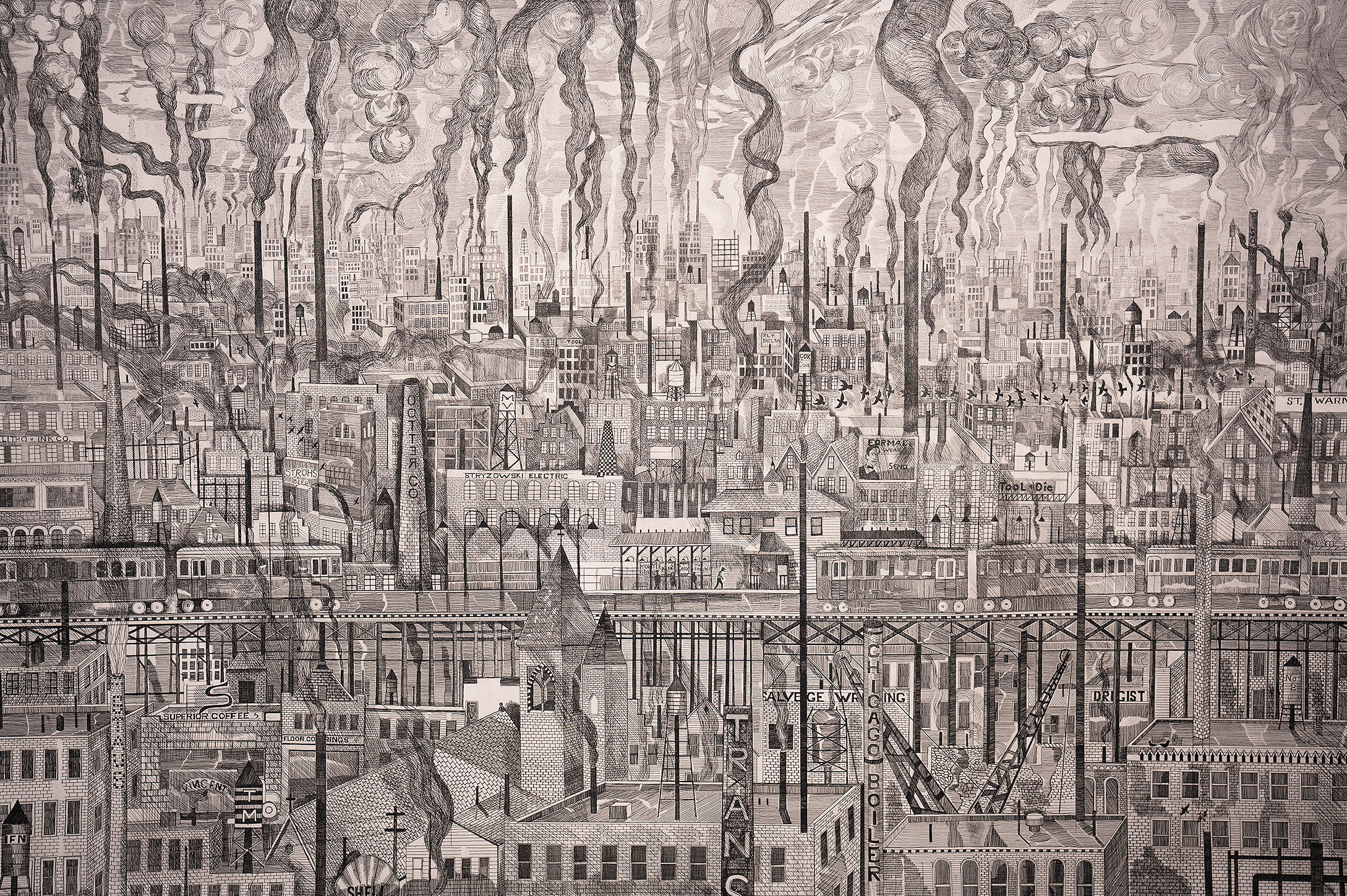
"A Working Day" 2009, with an image size of 24" x 35" and is a highly detailed etching reflecting the interest in the Chicago Cityscape seen in his paintings.

In 1974, Knudsen was awarded a sabbatical to study with Stanley William Hayter at Atelier 17 in Paris. Hayter's influence is seen in Knudsen's engravings starting in 1974. "In Praise of Architecture", engraved in 1974, represents his change in style toward more abstract and playful linear compositions.

Knudsen established the Illinois Print and Drawing Show to promote greater interest in fine art within the Harper College community. The show became a significant source of art acquisition for the college. In time, it quickly gained national interest and was renamed as the National Juried Art Exhibition: Small Works.

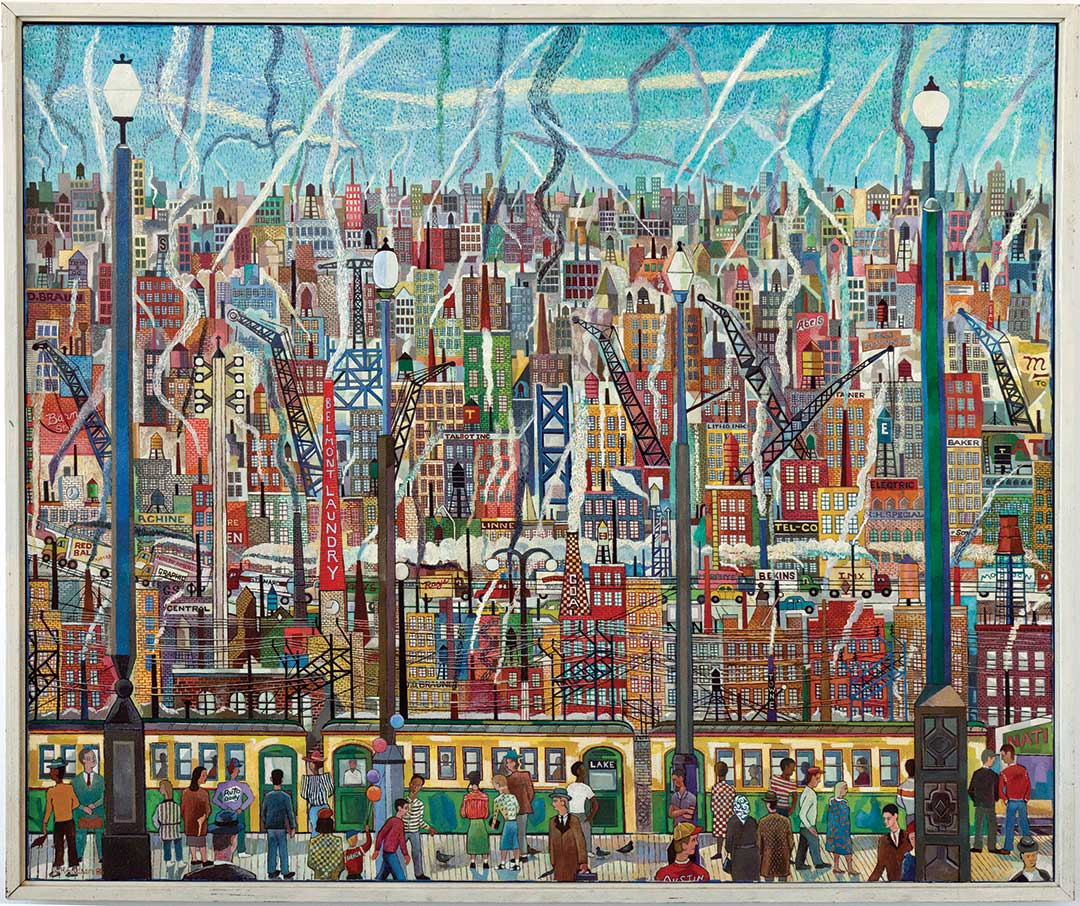
"High School Days" 1986, oil on canvas with an image size of 50" x 60" represents a Chicago Cityscape. Much of his paintings and prints focus on the City of Chicago.

Another artistic influence for Knudsen were the rich natural dyes and textures of oriental rugs from countries like Turkmenistan, Afghanistan, and Uzbekistan. He incorporated these elements into his cityscape paintings. Knudsen was a very active supporter of The Chicago Rug Society and in 1994 became the organization's president.

In 1998, Knudsen retired from Harper College to focus on his own artwork.

== John A. Knudsen Workshop/Gallery ==
In 1993, Knudsen opened his own gallery, The John A. Knudsen Workshop/Gallery, in Union Pier, Michigan. He produced woodcut prints primarily using themes from southwest Michigan and urban settings such as expressways and Chicago cityscape scenes. In addition he continued producing paintings and etchings. He would often use buildings and trucks of all sizes. The composition in both painting and printmaking was always bold, colorful, and congested with objects, people, buildings, and smoke covering the image area. At this time, Knudsen's woodcuts became heavily influenced by the German Expressionist movement Die Brücke which was popular in the 1930s.

Later in 2003, Knudsen opened another gallery at the Generation Gallery of the Featherbone Building in Three Oaks, Michigan. Here he explored oil and acrylic painting using very bold, bright colors in urban themes. “El People”, a large acrylic painting, is one example of this new direction in his artwork.

== Legacy ==
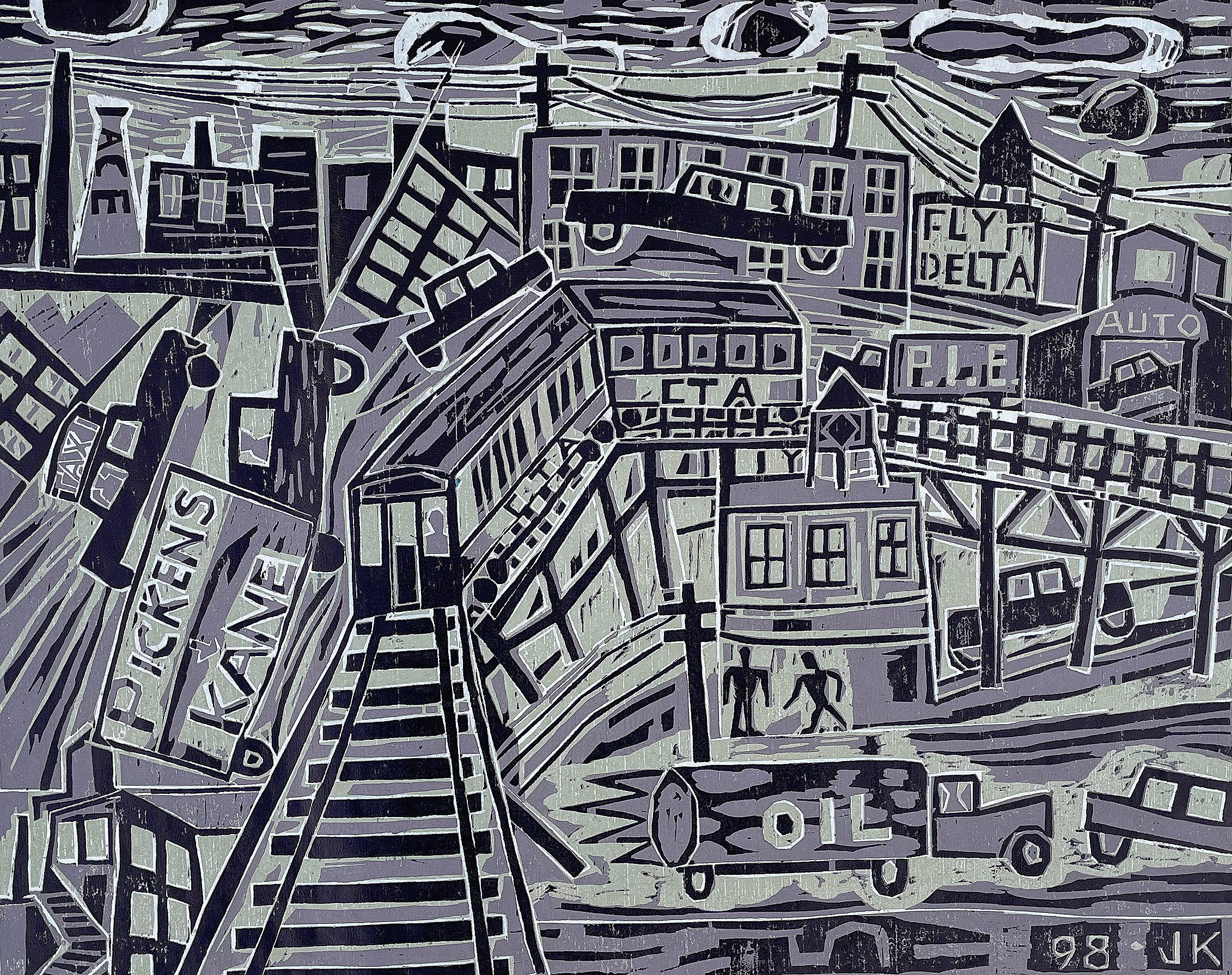
"Around the Bend" 1998 woodcut print with an image size of 15" x 19" depicting Urban Chicago with influences from German Expressionism.

The John Knudsen Memorial Scholarship was established after his death in 2014 to provide financial assistance to Harper College students pursuing fine art.

In honor of his service to Harper College as well as his talent, the “John A. Knudsen: Retrospective” was given at the campus from August 31 to October 1, 2015. A wide variety of etchings, engravings, woodcuts, and paintings were displayed that demonstrated his varying style.

Longtime friend and colleague Evan Lindquist and his wife Sharon made a generous donation of artwork to the Bradbury Art Museum at Arkansas State University in Jonesboro, Arkansas that prompted another retrospective of Knudsen's work. The show was held at the Bradbury Art Museum in the fall of 2016 and was entitled "Vicinity". It focused on etchings, lithographs, and silk screen prints of the Chicago cityscape.

In the fall of 2016, a one-man show retrospective was held at Garrett-Evangelical Theological Seminary in Evanston, Illinois. Osvaldo Vena, professor emeritus, reviewed Knudsen's body of artwork and proposed a show that focused on religious themes that were present in many of his pieces. Knudsen's work was influenced by being raised in a family with a Lutheran minister as a father. He was also greatly influenced by Romanesque religious iconography.

Knudsen's cityscape paintings continue to be represented at the Merchandise Mart in Chicago by the Richard Norton Gallery. His printmaking work is represented by Thomas Cvikota of C. Editions. Cvikota was a former student and advocate for Knudsen's prints.

John Knudsen was one of the original art professors when William Rainey Harper College opened in the fall of 1967. He was instrumental in fighting for hiring artists who were most qualified as opposed to the hiring of friends. This served Harper College in attracting students who were already attending 4-year colleges but wanted to study with the Harper College faculty and transfer their credit back into their original program. It also set up the school to be capable of serving students with the changes that come with time.

In 1985 he had a large one-person exhibition at the University of Minnesota’s Katherine Nash Gallery of all abstract work. He eliminated the representational forms of the past but spent time on expanding the abstract patterns that made up these forms. Afterwards he returned to representation with new vigor based on this experience.

In 1994, John Knudsen had a one-person exhibition at the Beauxmage Fine arts in St. Paul Minnesota. He also had 2 one-person exhibitions at the Grand Hand Gallery, St Paul Minnesota in 1998 and 1999.

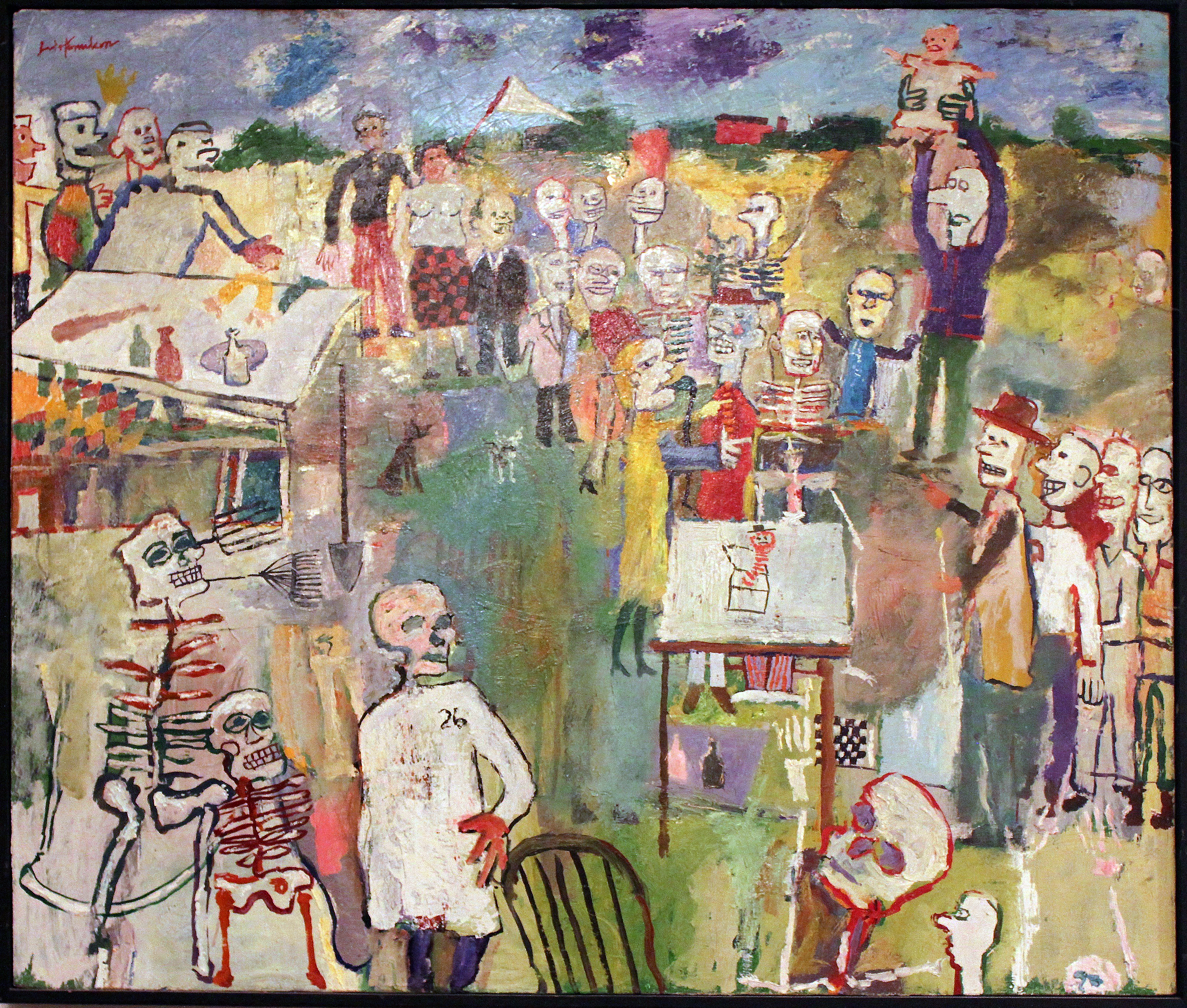
John Knudsen, 1968, "Auction", oil on canvas, in the collection of David Feinberg
