= Nasima =

Nasima, Nassima, or Naseema is a feminine given name of Arabic origin. Notable people with the name include:

== Given name ==
=== Naseema ===
- Naseema Ehsan, Pakistani politician
- Naseema Khatoon, Indian human rights activist
- Naseema Mohamed (born 1940), Maldivian historian and first lady
- Naseema Hafeez Panezai, Pakistani politician

=== Nasima ===
- Nasima Akhter (born 1970), Bangladeshi scientist
- Nasima Anis (born 1962), Bangladeshi writer
- Nasima Begum (born 1960), Bangladeshi jurist
- Nasima Ferdushe (born 1962), Bangladeshi politician
- Nasima Haider, Bangladeshi diplomat
- Nasima Khan (1944–2026), Bangladeshi actress
- Nasima Khan Monty (born 1977), Bangladeshi journalist and writer
- Nasima Razmyar (born 1984), Afghan-Finnish politician

=== Nassima ===
- Nassima Abidi, Tunisian footballer
- Nassimah Dindar (born 1960), French politician
- Nassima Dob (born 1980), Algerian handball player
- Nassima Hablal (1928–2013), Algerian independence activist
- Nassima Ben Hamouda (born 1973), French-Algerian volleyball player
- Nassima el Hor, Moroccan television presenter
- Nassima al-Sadah (born 1974), Saudi human rights writer and activist
- Nassima Saifi (born 1988), Algerian Paralympian athlete
