= Farishta (disambiguation) =

Farishta, or Fereshteh, is a feminine given name of Persian origin.

Farishta may also refer to:

- Farishta (1958 film), an Indian Hindi-language suspense thriller film
- Farishta (1984 film), an Indian Hindi-language film
- Farishta (2023 film), an Indian Bhojpuri-language drama film
