= Naseema Khatoon =

Indian human rights activist

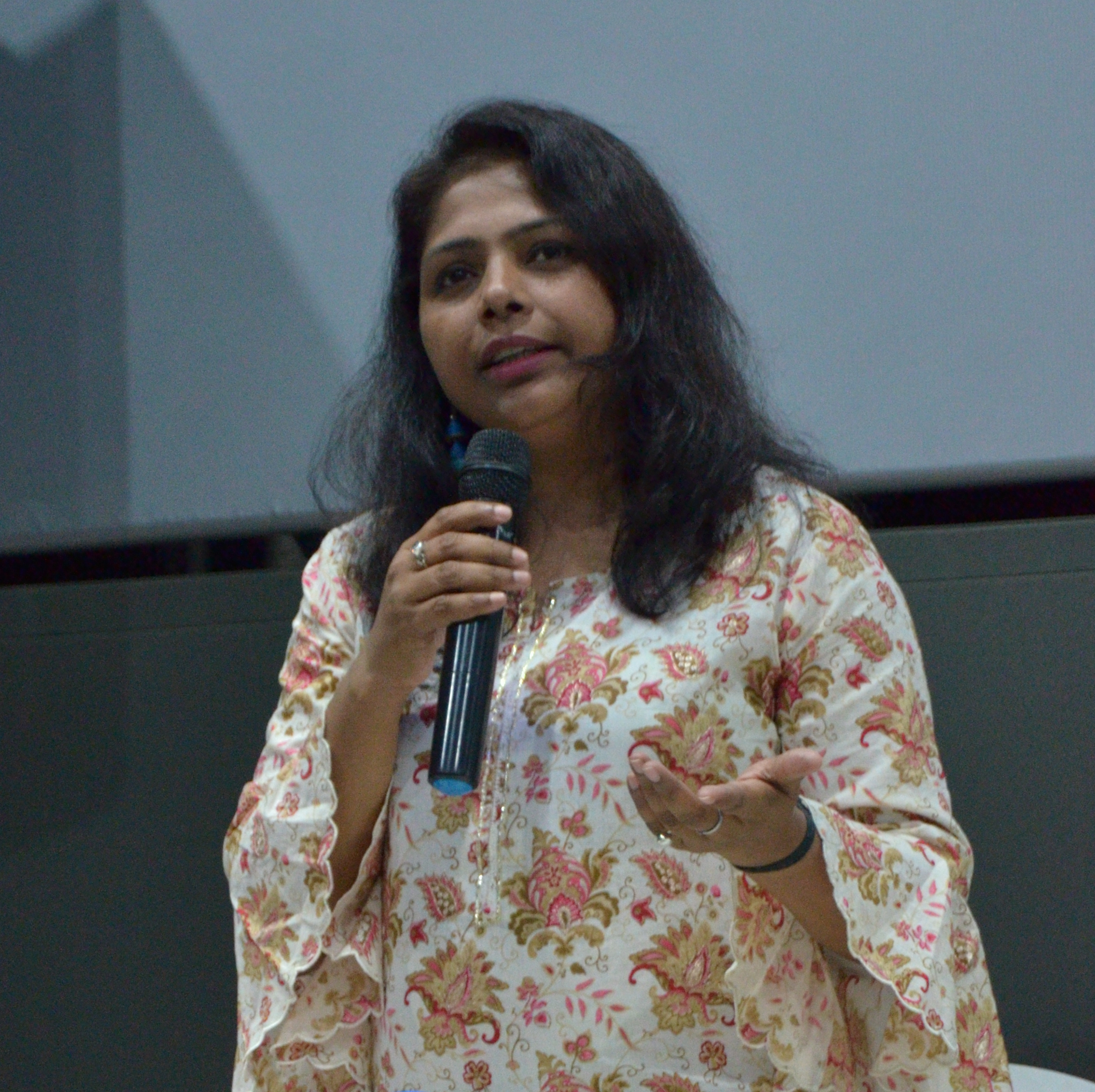
- Naseema Khatoon in 2019
- Born: Chaturbhuj Sthan, Muzaffarpur, Bihar, India
- Occupation: Human rights activist
- Notable credit: Parcham
- Children: 1

Naseema Khatoon is an Indian human rights activist from Muzaffarpur, Bihar. She is the founder of Parcham, an NGO that works towards the rehabilitation of sex workers and their families.

== Early life ==
Naseema Khatoon was born in Chaturbhuj Sthan, Muzaffarpur in Bihar. Her father owned a tea stall, and was adopted by a sex worker. It was this adopted grandmother who raised Naseema as a child. Growing up in a red-light district, Khatoon's childhood was full of poverty, lack of education and hiding during police raids. Her only solace was that she and her siblings were not pushed into sex work. Things improved for her in 1995, when IAS officer Rajbala Verma decided to come up with alternate programmes for sex workers and their families. Naseema enrolled in one such programme, called "Better Life Option", earning up to ₹500 a month for crochet work. However, she faced much backlash for this from her neighbours, much to the anger of her father, who sent her to her maternal grandmother's house in Sitamarhi's Boha Tola. However, the coordinator of the NGO convinced her father, and she was given the opportunity to go to Mumbai to complete her basic education under the NGO.

== Parcham ==
In 2001, Naseema returned to Muzaffarpur to find that the situation of the sex workers was still the same. She decided to form Parcham, an NGO dedicated to rehabilitate both sex workers and their families. She began by organizing street plays to educate the workers about their rights, and gradually moved towards their education. She managed to Soon, she helped start small industries of making bindis, candles, incense and matchsticks in the brothel, with the help of loans from local banks. With her efforts, the number of young girls joining as sex workers has reduced significantly.

In 2008, the brothels of Boha Tola in Sitamarhi were raided and burnt down. Naseema and Parcham came to the rescue of the sex workers and their families, fighting for their rights. With her work, she managed to attract the local government's attention to the problems faced by the residents of brothels. In then Bihar Chief Minister Nitish Kumar's "Vikas Yatra" in Sitamarhi in 2008, she personally attracted his attention to the incident at Boha Tola, and he requested her to compile the data of all sex workers in Bihar. A year later, her suggestions for conducting surveys in the red-light areas were accepted by Bihar's Women Development Corporation (WDC). She also managed to open a study centre of IGNOU at her residence at Shukla Road in Chaturbhuj Sthan, and even convinced LIC India to start an insurance scheme called Jeevan Madhur for the sex workers, with a minimal premium of ₹25 weekly.

In 2004, under the banner of Parcham, Khatoon helped start Jugnu (transl. glowworm) as a five-page newspaper about the sex workers. It is handwritten, edited and photocopied completely by the children of the sex workers. Jugnu is now a 32-page monthly magazine that covers stories such as rape and interviews sex workers across the state of Bihar and sells about a thousand copies. Other highlights of the magazine include paintings and featured letters in the author's own handwriting. The magazine is headquartered at Hafizee Chowk, Sukla Road in Muzaffarpur.

In 2012, Naseema was involved in the call for justice for a minor gang rape victim in Sikar, near Delhi.

== Personal life ==
Naseema met a fellow social activist at a conference in 2003 and married him in 2008. He is from Jaipur, Rajasthan. Together, they both have one child, a boy.
