= Ludin =

Ethnic group in Afghanistan

Ludin or Lodin (Pashto: لودین) is a tribe progenited by Syed Muhammad Masood (Mashwani) from his grandson Hassan Allauddin. Ludins settled among the area of Ghurghasht tribe of Pashtuns. They are scattered all over Afghanistan and can be found in most of the major cities.

== Demographics ==
Ludins are primarily found in Kandahar, Zabul, Nangarhar, Kunduz, Akora khattak, Balkh, Logar, Kabul and Herat provinces. Ludins in Balkh Province are mainly located in Dawlatabad District and Mazari Sharif. In Logar Province they live in Mohammad Agha and Pul-i-Alam districts.

== Notable Ludins ==
- Atiqullah Ludin, politician
- Azizullah Lodin, politician
- Fereshta Ludin, teacher
- Jawed Ludin, politician
- Saif Lodin, social activist
