= Austin Mecklem =

American artist

Mecklem's mural of Matthew Alexander Henson planting the American flag at the North Pole (1943). Recorder of Deeds Building, 515 D Street, Washington D.C.

Austin Merrill Mecklem (1890–1951) was an American artist. He did mural projects for the Works Progress Administration during the Great Depression era before settling down in the artist colony at Woodstock, New York. One of his works, Old Town in Alaska, is in the Wrangell, Alaska post office.

Mecklem's work is in the permanent collections of the Speed Memorial Museum in Louisville, Kentucky, the Binghamton (N.Y.) Museum of Fine Arts in Binghamton, New York, the Whitney Museum of American Art in New York City, the Museum of Modern Art, both in New York City and the Smithsonian.

== Personal life ==
Mecklem was born in Colfax, Washington on December 17, 1890. (He later often gave his birth year as 1894, but the earlier date has been confirmed by a family record and by a signed, witnessed 1926 application by Mecklem to the Navy for adjustment to compensation for his naval reserve service.) Mecklem was a son of Archibald McDanel Mecklem and Laura Isobelle Smith. One of Austin's brothers was Llewellyn Guy "L. G." Mecklem (1882-1973), daredevil aerialist and racecar driver, who made the first powered flight over Seattle, in a hydrogen-filled airship, in 1908.

During World War I Mecklem joined the United States Navy and served on the USS Brooklyn (ACR-3). Soon after the war ended, the Brooklyn headed to Vladivostok, Russia to support the American Expeditionary Force, Siberia. On a document he filed with the Navy, Mecklem stated that he served in Vladivostok for "about 7 months in the harbor about 2 months of which were shore duty." After leaving the Navy, Mecklem then moved to New York City and studied at the Art Students League with Kenneth Hayes Miller and Boardman Robinson. In 1926, he traveled to France, Holland, Belgium and England.

Mecklem married Hannah Small about 1923. The couple lived in the Maverick "art colony" in Woodstock, New York, then moved to Portland, Oregon, where Mecklem taught painting and had his first solo show, at the Portland Art Museum in 1928. Austin and Hannah traveled to Europe in 1929, and resided in New York City for a time. Hannah Small became romantically involved with the painter Eugene Ludins, and eventually Small and Mecklem divorced, after which Small married Ludins.

Mecklem married Marianne Appel in 1937. They lived at the Maverick colony in Woodstock in a cabin. Mecklem died on October 7, 1951. Austin and Marianne had two children, Sarah Greer Mecklem and Margaret Merrill Mecklem. After Austin's death, Marianne moved, with her daughters, to New York City, where she worked as a puppet designer, and authored and illustrated children's books; she later worked for Jim Henson. In 1960, she married Carl Harms, an actor, puppeteer, and board member of Actors Equity.
