= Berta Golahny =

American painter (1925–2005)

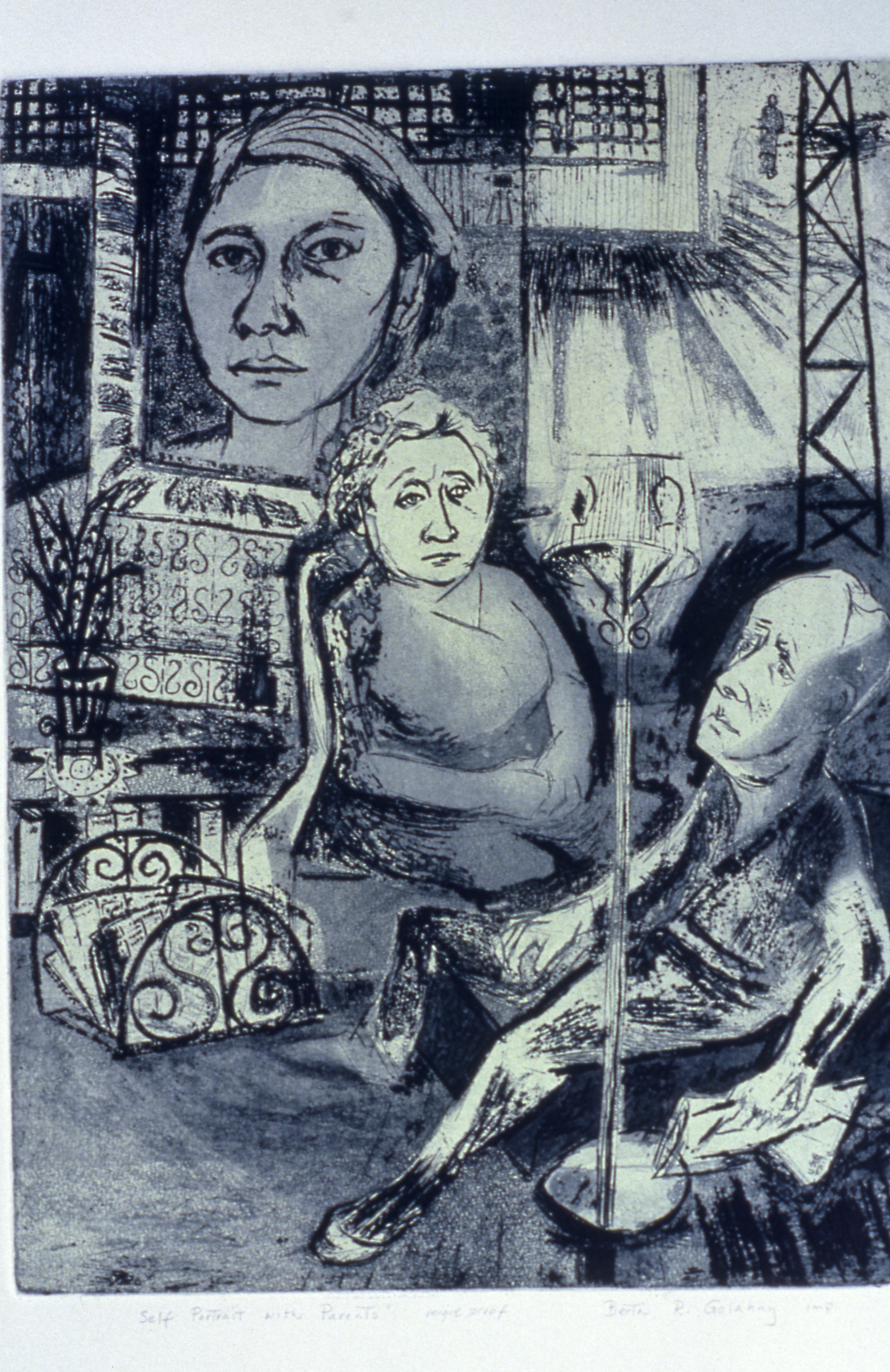
- Self Portrait with Parents, 1949, intaglio (etching and softground), 18" x 13". Private Collection.
- Born: Bertha Rosenbaum; February 7, 1925
- Died: November 4, 2005 (aged 80)
- Education: Cass Technical High School; Art Students League of New York; Art Institute of Chicago; University of Iowa
- Known for: Painting, printmaking, sculpture
- Spouse: Yehuda Golahny (m. 1949)
- Children: 2

Berta Golahny (born Bertha Rosenbaum; February 7, 1925 – November 4, 2005) was an American painter, printmaker, and sculptor.

== Biography ==
Golahny was born Bertha Rosenbaum in 1925 in Detroit to Jewish immigrant parents, Fannie (Hencken) Rosenbaum (ca. 1891–1953, born in Beshankovichy, Belarus) and Gedaliah Rosenbaum (1890–1985, born in Włodawa, Poland). As a child, she began to draw while watching her father design wrought-iron pieces for the company he founded, Liberty Ironworks.

She was educated at Detroit's Cass Technical High School and then in 1943-4 the Art Students League of New York, having received a National Scholarship. There, George Grosz encouraged her drawing and French artist Ossip Zadkine introduced her to sculpture.

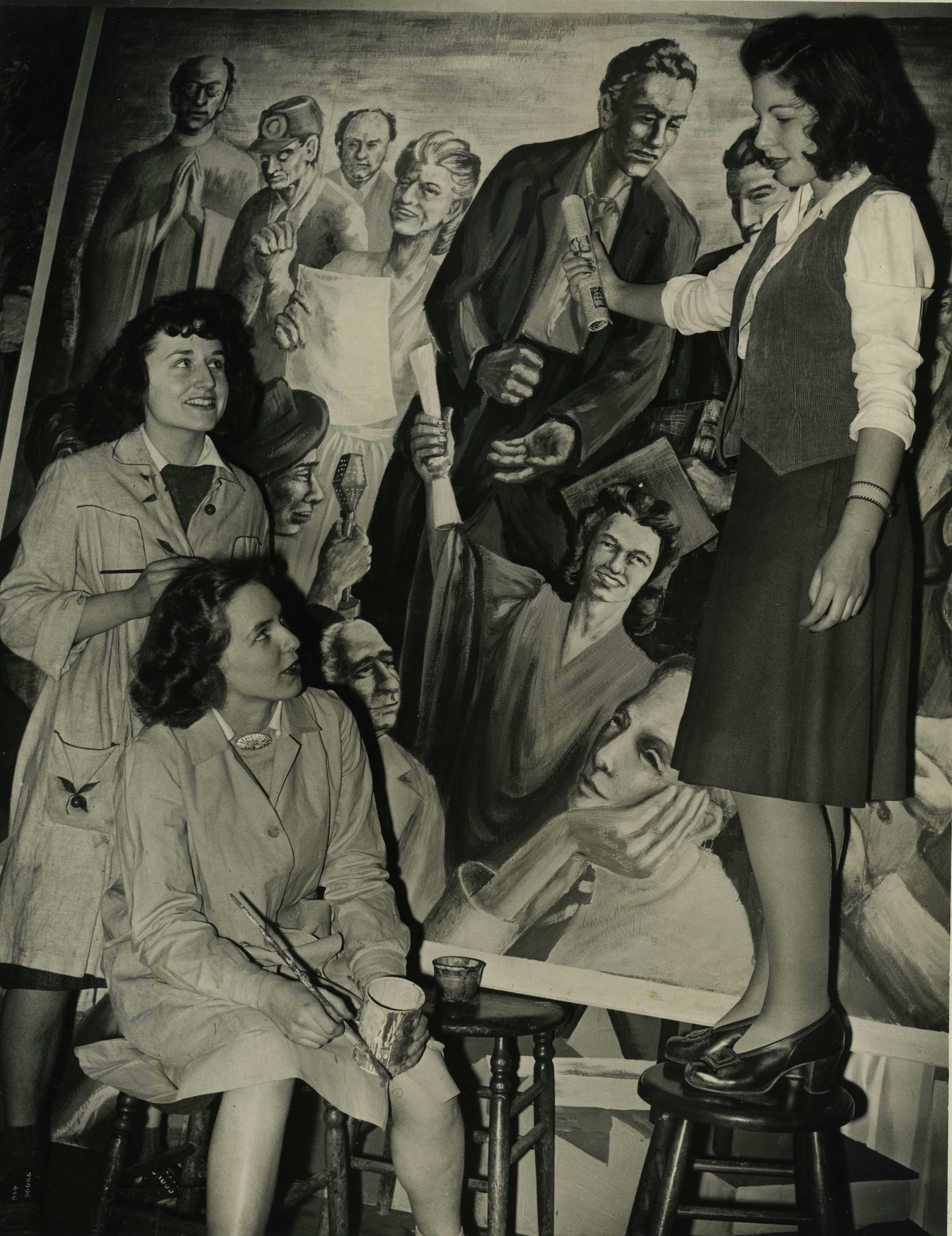
Golahny (standing on stool) with high school classmates with whom she designed and painted a mural of the Four Freedoms for a Detroit storefront, 1943

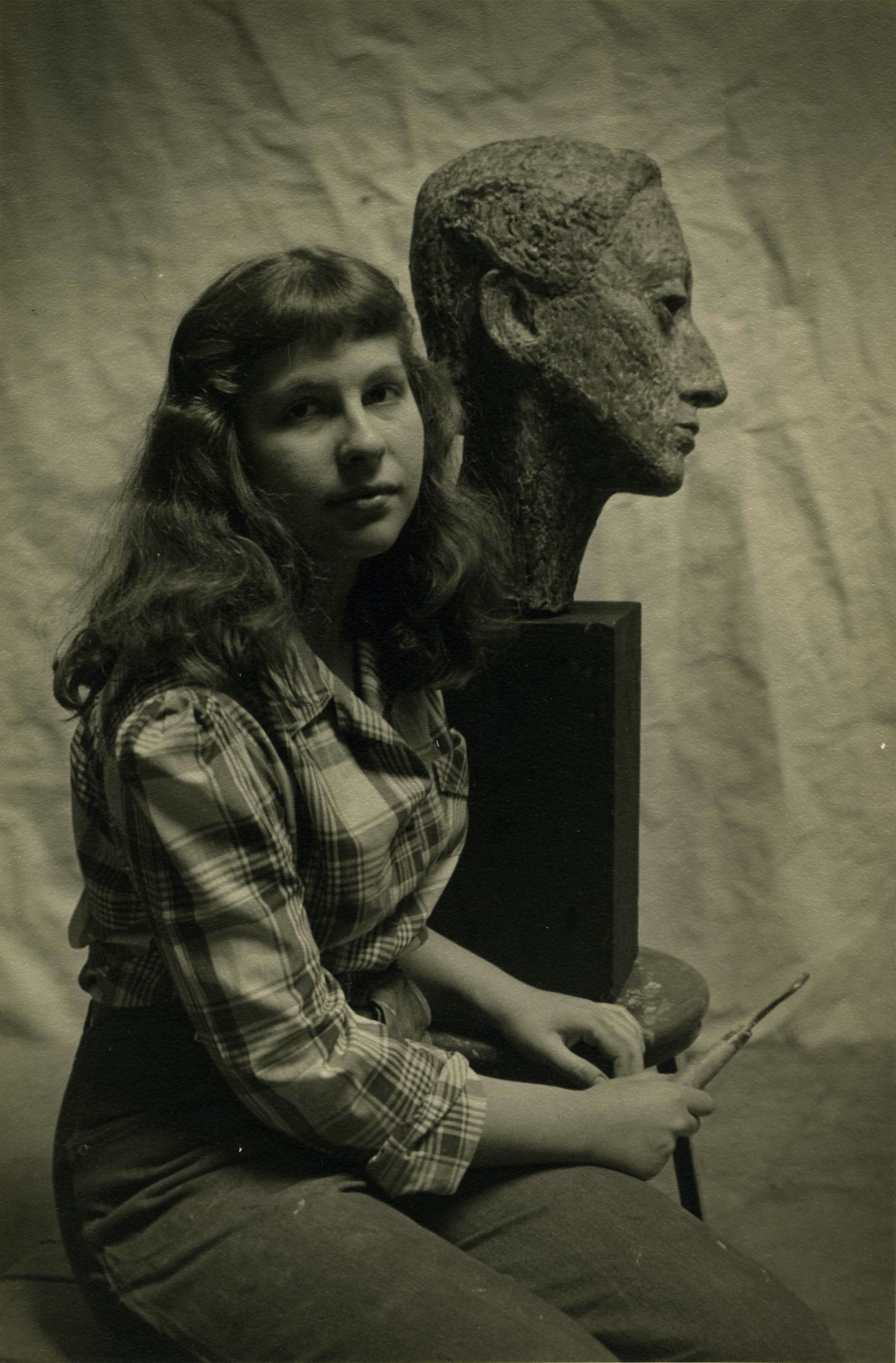
Golahny and her sculpture Sheba

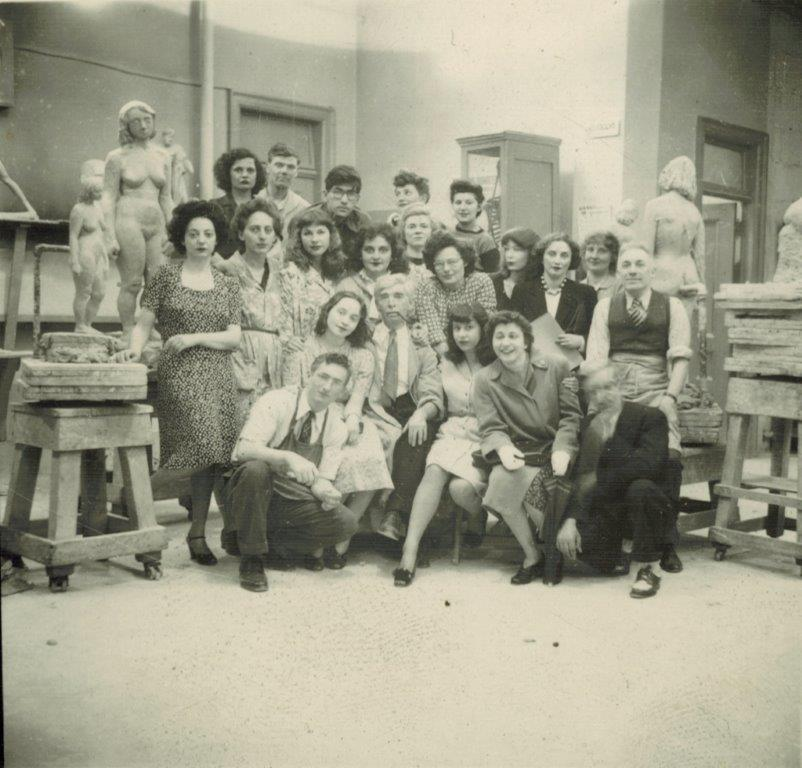
Photo of 1943-1944 sculpture class of Ossip Zadkine at the Art Students League of NYC; Zadkine is in middle, with tie; Golahny is in middle row, third from left, with long hair

Golahny continued her studies at the Art Institute of Chicago. After receiving her Bachelor's in Fine Art from the Art Institute in 1947, Golahny completed her studies at the University of Iowa, from which she received a Master's in Fine Art in 1950. At Iowa, she studied printmaking under Mauricio Lasansky, art history under William S. Heckscher, and painting under Eugene Ludins. Her painting The Resurrection was awarded the Painting Prize by juror Ben Shahn. In 1951, she was awarded a fellowship from The Louis Comfort Tiffany Foundation. While at Iowa, she married Yehuda Golahny, an engineering student in Detroit. When Yehuda began to pursue a Master’s of Science in Electrical Engineering at MIT (class of 1954), the couple moved to Cambridge, Massachusetts. After two years, they moved to Newton, Massachusetts, where they settled.

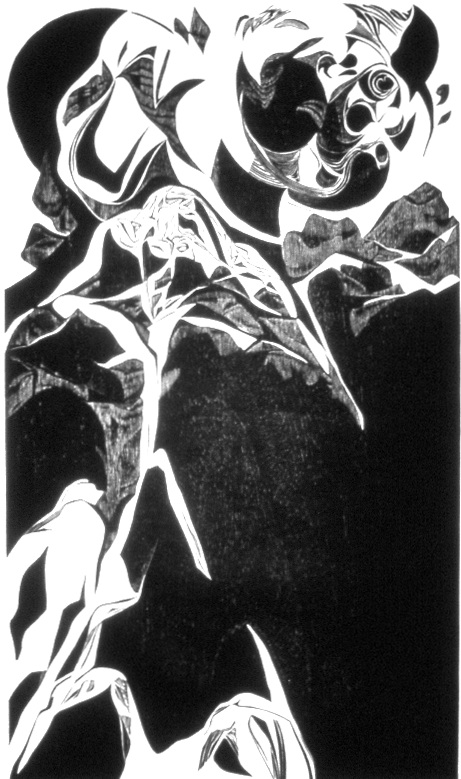
Sinai Summit, by Golahny, woodcut, 1970s, 36" x 20". Private collection.

From 1959 to 2001, Golahny taught at the Cambridge Center for Adult Education. The Center now gives an annual award in her honor. She exhibited in the US and other countries in several hundred juried and invitational shows. Today, her work is held in private collections in America, Canada, France, and Israel, and in the permanent collections of institutions including the Fogg Museum at Harvard University, the Boston Athenaeum, the Williams College Museum of Art, the Frances Lehman Loeb Center for the Arts at Vassar College, the Palmer Museum of Art at Penn State University, the University of Iowa, the Detroit Institute of Art, the Baltimore Museum of Art, the Ackland Art Museum at the University of North Carolina at Chapel Hill, the Wichita Art Museum, and the E. J. Pratt Library at the University of Toronto.

Golahny used the traditional media of etching, wood engraving, and woodcut. She experimented with monotype, with different ways of biting the plate, and with electric tools to incise lines upon zinc and copper plates.

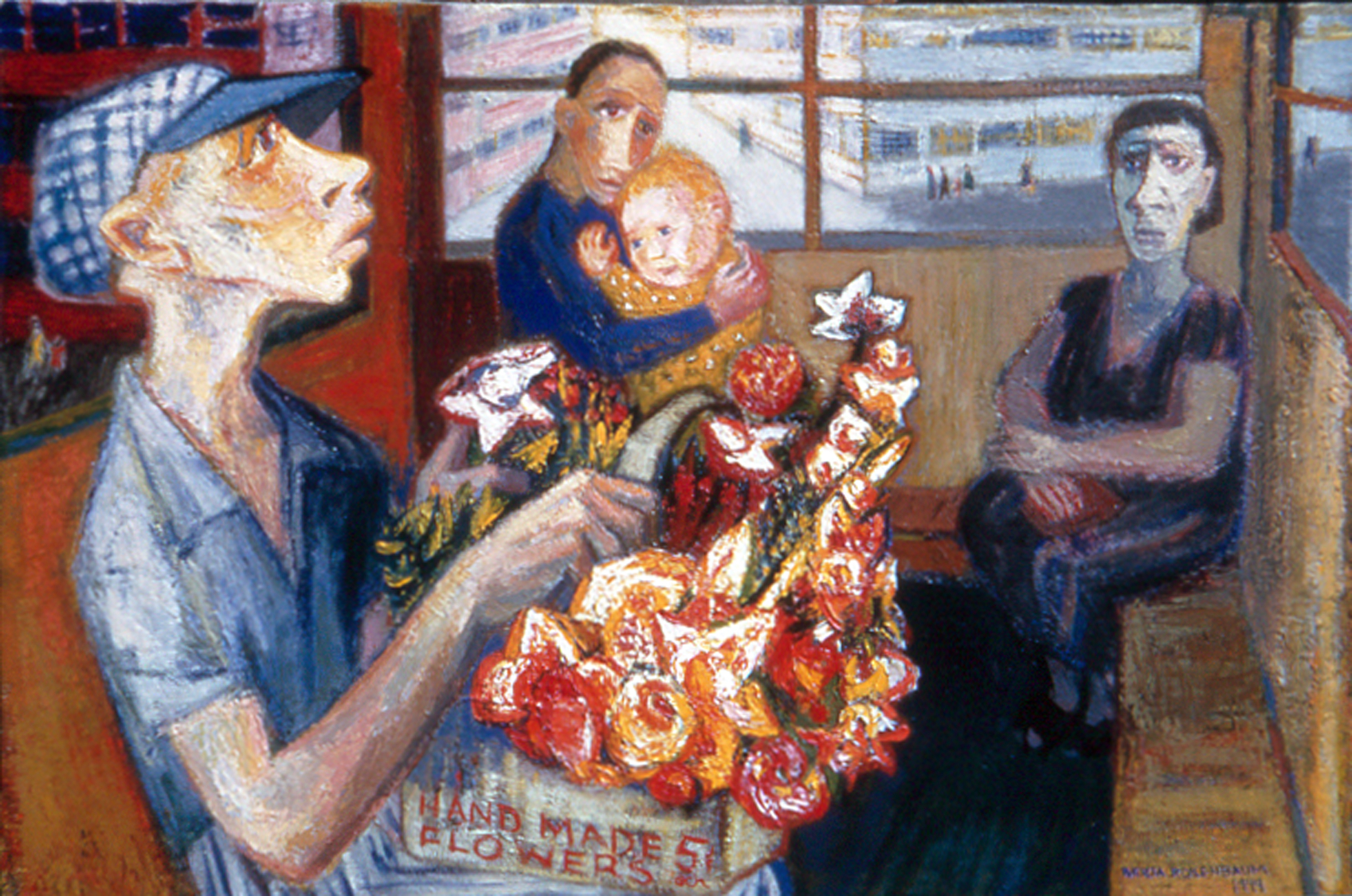
Street Car Scene, by Golahny, oil on canvas, 1940s. Private collection.

Artists with whom Golahny found affinity include Michelangelo, Picasso, Paul Cézanne, Max Beckmann, Wassily Kandinsky, Paul Klee, Franz Marc, and Nicolas de Staël.

Golahny's early paintings feature a darker palette and rougher line than her later paintings. Much of her early work, such as Street Car Scene, reflects city life in Detroit, New York City, and Chicago: people on buses or trains, workers in factories, and children at play. She blended the abstract and the figurative, often in a given work. Portraiture, including self-portraiture, was a lifelong interest, even as she explored the role of the individual in history and in the cosmos. One series of works, begun around 1964 with a multi-block color woodcut, was titled Landscape of Man in Nuclear Age. The series continued in intaglio, painting, wood engraving, and copper engraving, and was completed in 1988. Golahny repeatedly portrayed human suffering, as in a series of works on the Holocaust.

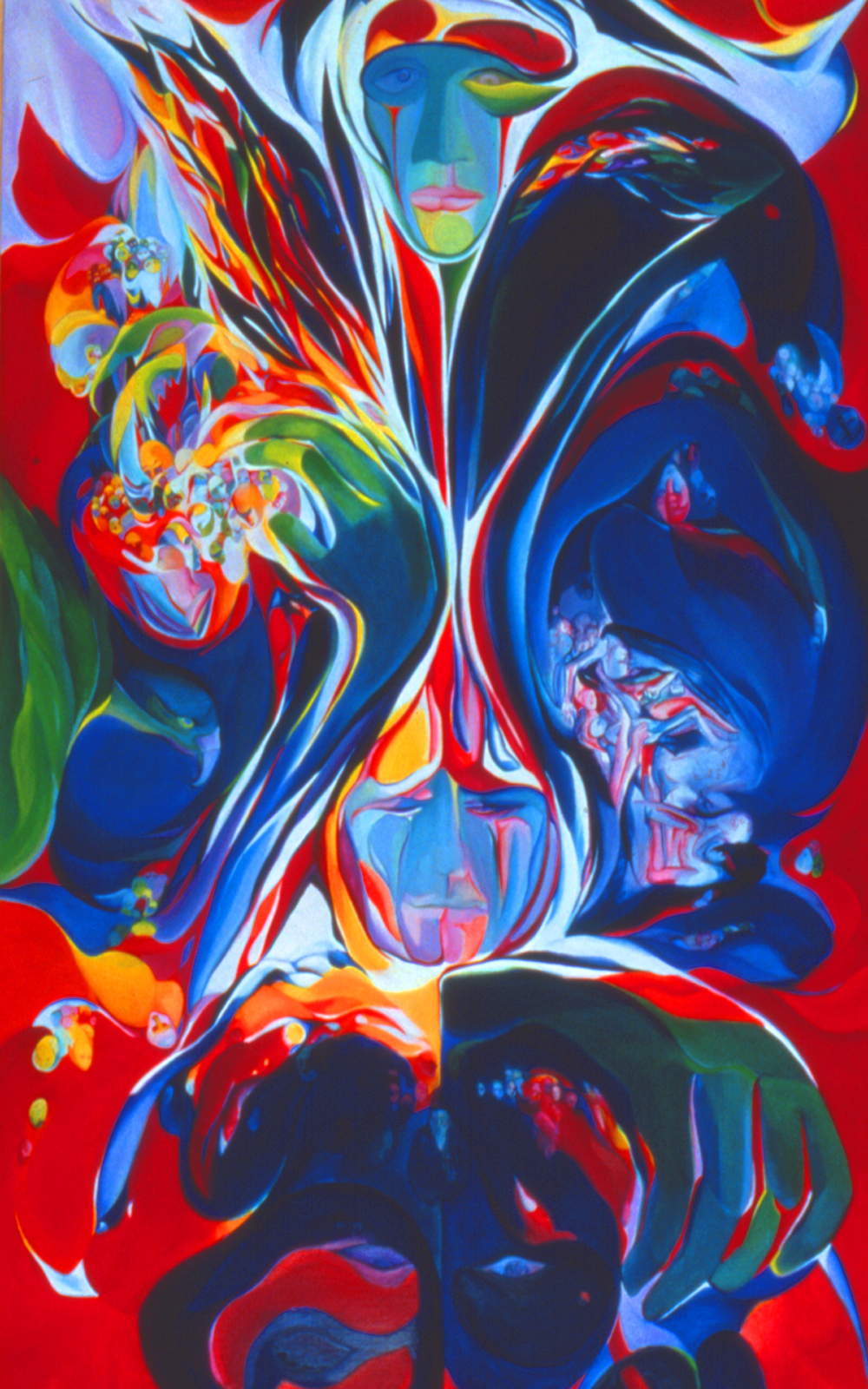
Landscape of Man in Nuclear Age #2, by Golahny, oil on canvas, 1984, 48" x 30". Private collection.

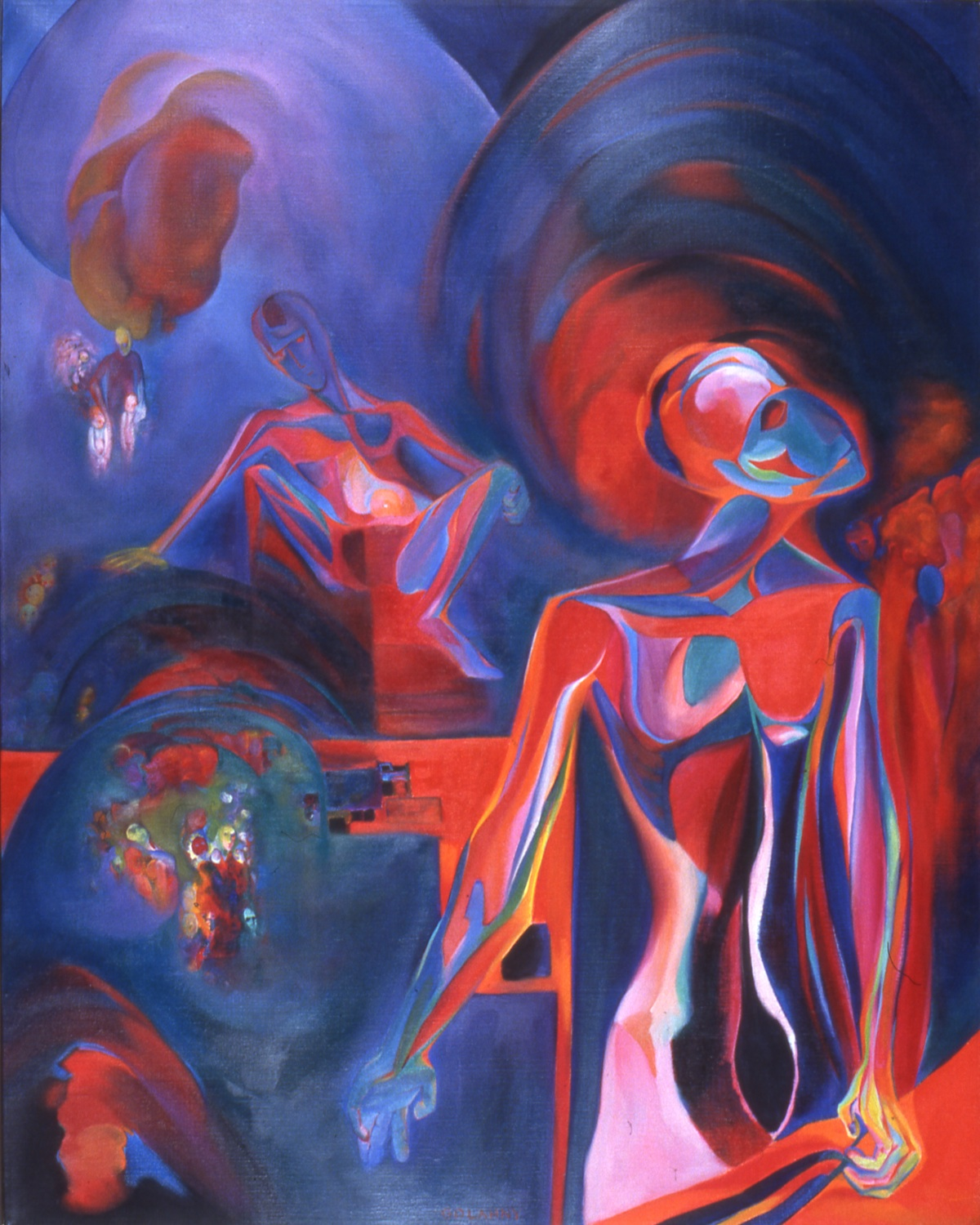
Concentration Camp #1, by Golahny, oil on canvas, 1985, 30" x 24". Private collection.

A visit to a Midwest state fair inspired an intaglio print of 1949 titled Children at the Fair: The Ride. Golahny reprised this composition of a whirligig (a central pole with carts swinging from it) in a 1987 woodcut and in several subsequent large paintings.

Inspired by publications on nebulae and black holes, Golahny began the Space series in 1980. In dozens of paintings she modeled her images on photographs of cosmic exploration in the archives of the Harvard College Observatory. She also painted evocative layerings of an imagined passage through space and time, and fantastic semi-formed creatures. Art historian Alicia Faxon wrote of one of Golahny's paintings of the Crab Nebula, "Golahny's Crab Nebula . . . capture[s] the process of creation, a process that takes place both in the creation of the nebula and in the gestation of the painting itself. . . . In comparing Crab Nebula to the photographs that inspired the work, it is fascinating to see how much more vivid and complex the artist's interpretation is. The photographs appear static; the painting pulses with energy, embodying an endless universe in creation."

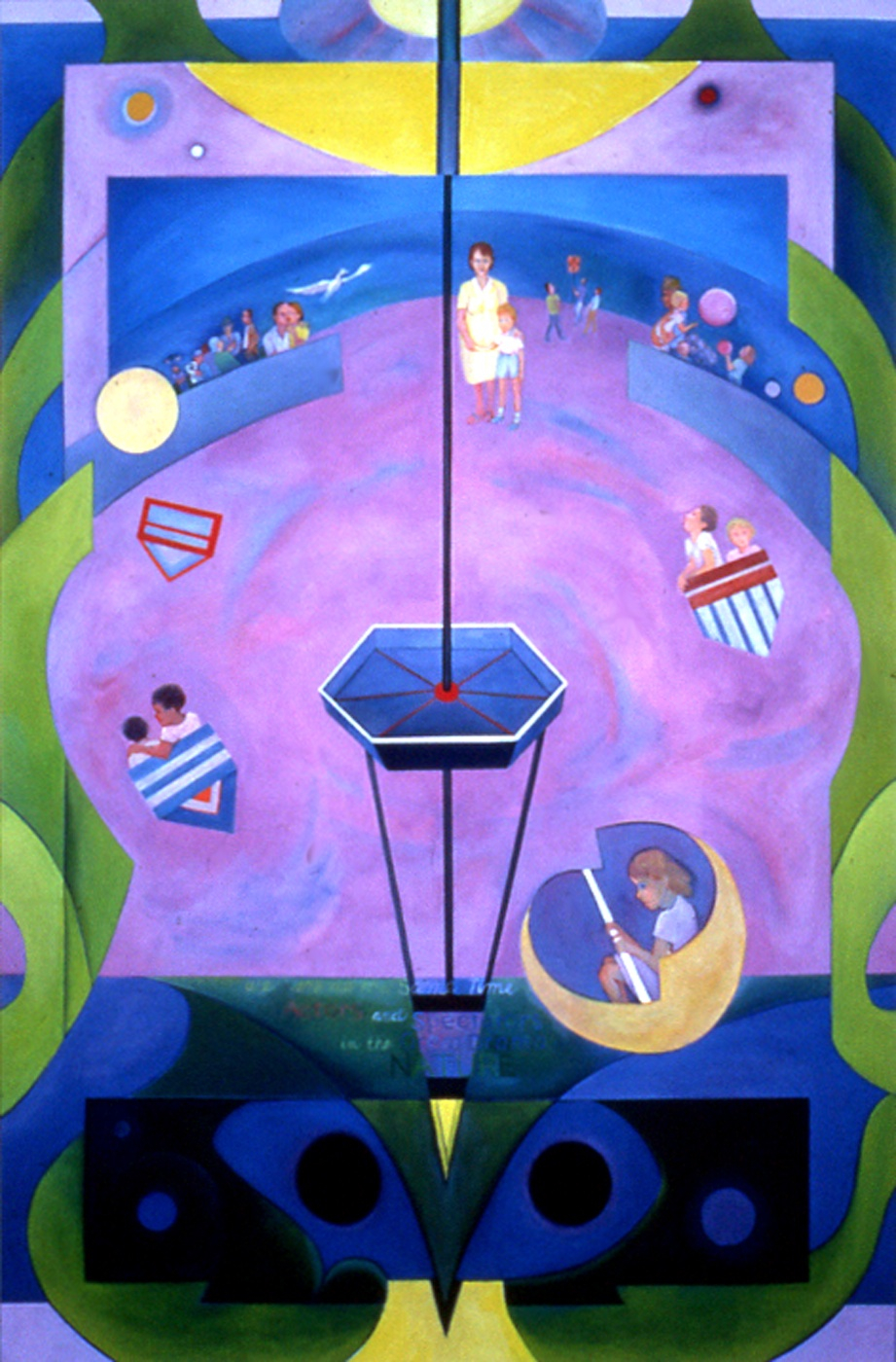
Children at the Fair #2, by Golahny, oil painting, 1990, 60" x 40". Private collection. The text is a quotation from Niels Bohr: "We are at the same time actors and spectators in the great drama of nature."

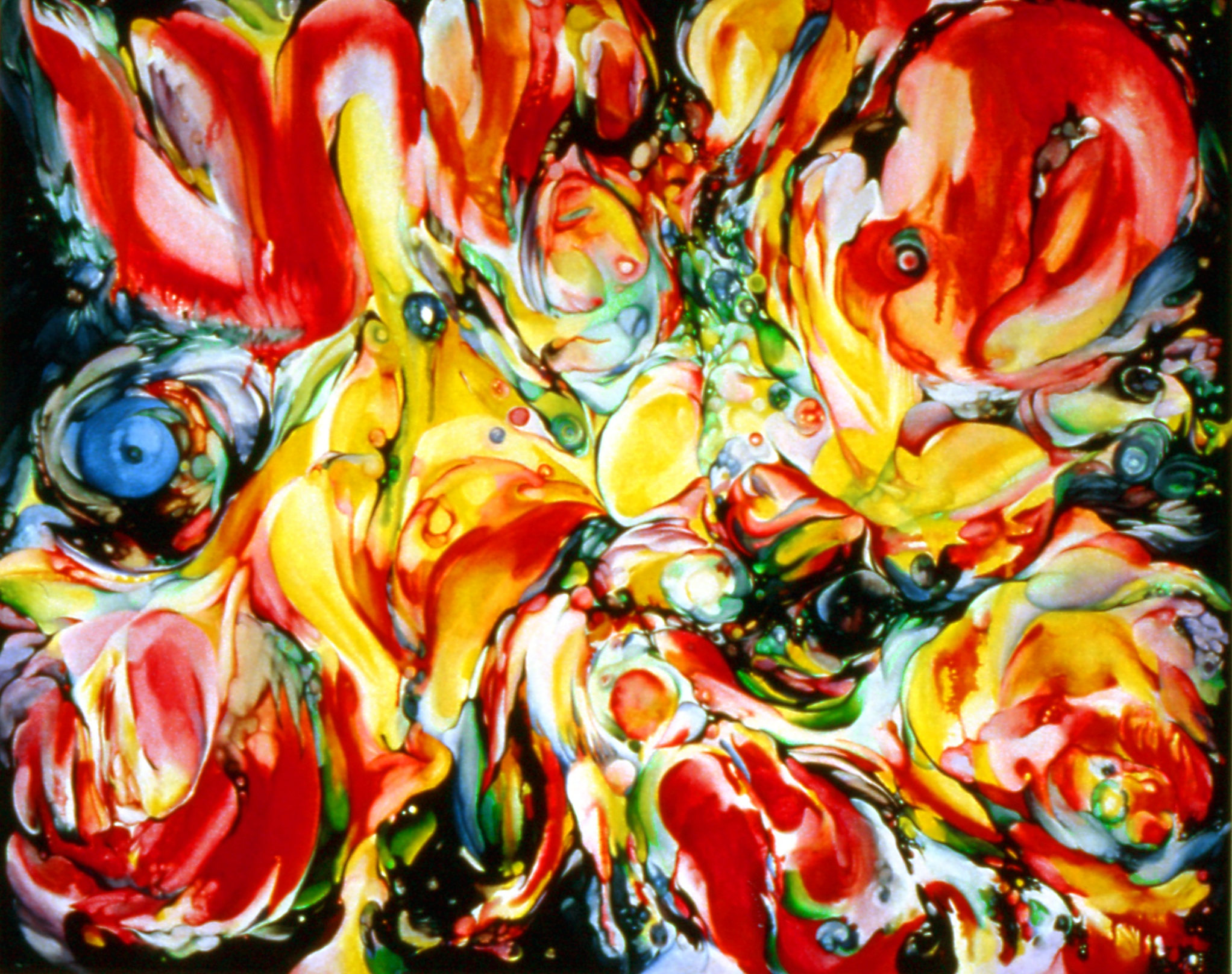
Crab Nebula #1, by Golahny, oil on canvas, 1980s, 30" x 36". Private collection.

The Being and Becoming series concerns the expansion of the universe since the Big Bang. Inspired by this series and other paintings, Boston-based musicians Paul and Rosalie DiCrescenzo wrote a four-movement score to accompany a slide-show of the images, titled The Watchers and the Watched. This was performed with support from the Massachusetts Council on the Arts in 1995. Golahny died in November 2005. A commemoration of her life and work at the Newton Free Library in December 2006 included The Watchers and the Watched.

Among her last paintings was The Striving, 9/11 and History, a response to the September 11, 2001 attacks on the World Trade Center.

In Spring 2018, Lycoming College (Williamsport, Pennsylvania) hosted a large exhibition of her work, Berta Golahny: The Human Abstract.
