= Nasruddin Mohseni =

Afghan politician

Sayed Nasruddin Mohseni
- Occupation: politician
- Known for: Served on the Constitutional Loya Jirga

Sayed Nasruddin Mohseni is a politician of Afghanistan. He is a leader of the Hizb e Wahadat e Islami—a party that serves members of Hazara ethnic group, who are from Islam's Sh'ia minority.

== Delegate to the Constitutional Loya Jirga 2002-2004 ==
During the 2001 Bonn Conference that selected Hamid Karzai as Afghanistan's interim leader obliged him to empower a Constitutional Loya Jirga to write a new constitution. Karzai appointed Nasruddin Mohseni to be a delegate to the Loya Jirga. He sat on the first of the Jirga's ten committees, chaired by Ustad Rabani. Committee one drafted 45 articles. The Jirga sat from 2002 through 2004. Popular elections to the Wolesi Jirga, the lower house of Afghanistan's national assembly followed in 2005.

== Hizb e Wahadat e Islami ==
Eurasianet chose to quote Nasruddin while describing mounting disenchantment with Hamid Karzai's central government among the minority groups in Afghanistan's north. They described him as a "senior leader" of the Hizb e Wahadat e Islami.
