= Marianne Appel =

American artist

- Born: Marianne Greer Appel; May 6, 1913; Woodstock, New York, U.S.
- Died: September 26, 1988 (aged 75); New York City, New York, U.S.
- Other names: Marianne Mecklem, Marianne Appel Mecklem, Marianne Harms
- Occupations: Artist, puppeteer fabricator
- Years active: 1934–1983
- Known for: WPA murals, oil paintings, Muppet fabricator

Marianne Appel (May 6, 1913 – September 26, 1988) was an American artist and a member of the Woodstock artists colony. She was also known under the professional name of Marianne Harms as a puppet designer. She painted murals for the Works Progress Administration (WPA) Fine Arts Section during the Great Depression and was selected for exhibits at the Whitney Museum of American Art, the Art Institute of Chicago, the Corcoran Gallery of Art and has works in the permanent collections of the Metropolitan Museum of Art and the Smithsonian American Art Museum. She was married to Austin Mecklem from 1936 to his death in 1951, but kept her maiden name professionally until after her second marriage to Carl Harms in 1960, after which she went by Marianne Harms. Harms became an illustrator and puppet designer, learning her craft working with Bil Baird and then working as a designer and fabricator for Jim Henson on the pilot for The Muppets and numerous of his television specials and movies.

== Early life ==
Marianne Greer Appel was born on May 6, 1913 in New York, New York to Ethel (née Smith) and John W. Appel. Her family lived in New York City, then Scarsdale, She attended the Lincoln School. In 1933, she entered Sarah Lawrence College in Bronxville, where she studied art. She took painting under the direction of Bradley Walker Tomlin, sculpture with Gleb W. Derujinsky and textile studies with Lucie G. Jowers. That same year, during her freshman studies, some of her work was selected for inclusion with seventeen other students in an exhibit held at the Montrose Gallery in New York City. She graduated in 1934 and began working with the WPA's Section of Painting and Sculpture.

== Art career ==
Appel joined the Woodstock Art Association (WAA) and continued to study her craft under such teachers as Peppino Mangravite, Henry Mattson, Henry Lee McFee, Charles Rosen, and Judson Smith. Appel's painting "Shade Trees", completed in 1936 for a project in Ulster County, New York, was praised by New York Times art critic Edward Alden Jewell. Later that year, on August 1, 1936, at the Appel's camp in Bedford Village, New York, she married Austin Mecklem and the couple began living at the artists' community in Woodstock, New York. The following year, the new couple were part of a group of 12 artists selected to travel to Ketchikan, Alaska, to create paintings to familiarize Americans about the various territories and states in the country. The artists were divided into smaller groups, with Appel and Mecklem's group also consisting of Merlin Pollock and his wife Barbara Pank and John Edwin Walley and his wife Jano Walley working in the Juneau area. The smaller groups were sent to different areas to paint and together produced over 100 paintings, most of which were later lost in a fire. Poor weather forced them to return early to Ketchikan.

In 1938, Appel had a solo show of oil paintings at the Walker Gallery in Manhattan featuring her works done in Alaska and won the Woodstock Art Association's annual prize. She had works exhibited at the Whitney Museum of American Art beginning in 1938 through 1944 and at the Art Institute of Chicago from 1938 to 1942. The book American Painting Today was released in 1939 by the Oxford University Press and featured an entry on Appel's works, along with other prominent American artists like Thomas Hart Benton, John Sloan and Grant Wood. In 1940, a watercolor competition was held throughout the U.S. to select works for the U.S. Marine Hospital, which had formerly been the Carville Leprosarium. Of the 300 works selected, three were by Appel, including "Dear Mountain Trail", "Junction", and "Ebb Tide—Juneau". That year, her painting "Winter '39" was purchased for the permanent collection of the Metropolitan Museum of Art. Her works were also selected for an exhibit at the Corcoran Gallery of Art in both 1940 and 1941. Appel won a commission from the WPA to paint the mural for the post office in Middleport, New York in 1941. Her painting, "Rural Highway", featured a man and woman doing chores, on a lonely farm isolated on their homestead with nothing surrounding them but the sky and the distant horizon, cut through by an empty vanishing road. The following year, some of her works were featured in the American Federation of Arts' traveling show.

Mecklem and Appel were hired in 1943 to paint a mural for the Wrangell, Alaska post office. The work, "Old Town in Alaska" was completed in New York and shipped on October 19, 1943, by train. It took until December 1943 to arrive in Wrangell and was installed on October 20, 1944. That same year, one of Appel's paintings, "Juneau, Alaska", which depicted the coastal town at the foot of Mount Juneau, was featured in Life in the April 24th issue. In October, she had seascapes exhibited as part of a group showing held at the Carnegie Museums of Pittsburgh's exhibition "Painting in the United States, 1944". In addition to painting, Appel also wrote children's stories, complete with illustrations. One, "The Story of Juliet" (1945), appears in her papers housed at the Smithsonian's Archives of American Art.

Appel designed a war memorial for the Woodstock, New York community village green. Her project was unanimously accepted by the War Memorial Committee and it was to be installed for a commemoration of Pearl Harbor Day on December 7, 1947. Austin Mecklem died on October 7, 1951, after a lengthy illness. For two years after his death, Appel continued living in Woodstock and helped plan a memorial exhibit for his works. In 1953, the artist's community hosted a retrospective memorial to Mecklem and Jeanne Magafan, another member of the community who had recently died.

== Designing and illustration career ==
After the memorial show closed, Appel and her two daughters, Merrill Mecklem and Sarah Greer Mecklem, moved to New York City, where she began work as an illustrator of children's books. She also worked as a puppeteer with Bil Baird and wrote a second juvenile fiction story called "Perlydew". In 1960, Appel married Carl Harms, who was an executive with Actors' Equity, as well as an actor and puppeteer. After her marriage, Appel changed her professional name to Marianne Harms.

Soon, she went to work for Jim Henson and became one of the designers of The Muppets. She was known for creating some of the more intricate Muppet characters. In 1975, Harms designed costumes for the pilot The Muppet Show: Sex and Violence and in 1977 she worked on Emmet Otter's Jug-Band Christmas as one of the puppet creators. Harms and several other artists created the Nativity Muppets for the 1979 television special John Denver and the Muppets: A Christmas Together and her design work on the special was nominated with other contributors for an Emmy Award for "Outstanding Individual Achievement in Creative or Technical Crafts" in 1980. That same year, she served on the design team for the series 5 episode of The Muppet Show hosted by Loretta Swit. She served on the team of designers that created the Podlings in The Dark Crystal in 1982 and then the following year worked on Fraggle Rock fabricating designs for the episode "Preachification of Convincing John". Harms died on September 26, 1988, in New York City.
