= Rape in Afghanistan =

Rape is a major issue in Afghanistan. A number of human rights organizations have criticized the country's rape laws and their enforcement.

== Definition ==
Rape is a type of sexual assault usually involving sexual intercourse or other forms of sexual penetration perpetrated against a person without that person's consent. The act may be carried out by physical force, coercion, abuse of authority or against a person who is incapable of giving valid consent. This can include one who is unconscious, incapacitated, has an intellectual disability or is below the legal age of consent. The term rape is sometimes used interchangeably with the term sexual assault.

== Prevalence ==
Violence against women in Afghanistan reached record levels in 2013, according to the Afghan Independent Human Rights Commission (AIHRC). Women are respected for their virginity, and even if the woman gets pregnant after being raped, it is uncommon for her rapist to marry her. Thus a woman is now punished for being "impure". The Taliban authorities treat such cases as zina (adultery). Zina has been reported from every province of the country. Even if the woman is not punished, she remains rejected by society as "dishonorable" (badnaam in Pashto), while the rapist is not considered dishonored.

== Afghan law ==
The consent of underaged girls for sex is not covered by laws in Afghanistan but underage marriage, forced marriage, beating, rape, baad, humiliation, intimidation and food refusal was made illegal during Hamid Karzai's Presidency.

Islamic law, as interpreted in the local context and influenced by tribal customs, although uncodified, stopped successful prosecution of some rape cases in the country. The Quran does not specifically mention a punishment for rape, but under one interpretation of Shari'a, local tribal elders leaders may treat rape as a form of adultery, punishable by stoning to death or 100 lashes of the whip, although there were no reports of such cases during the year.

Adultery, rape and morality crimes may lead to honour killings if the family feels the honour has been lost and occasionally authorities claim that the detention of women accused of these acts is for their protection as they may be murdered otherwise.

Afghanistan also passed the Shia Family Law in 2009 under Afghan President Hamid Karzai. The United Nations Development Fund for Women, NATO, Canada, United States, Germany and other nations have come forward expressing concern over the oppressive nature of the law. The Shia Family Law takes away women's rights within a marriage and specifies that Shia women must submit to their husband's demands. It specifies that they must have sex with their husbands at least once every four days, except in the case of illness. The law only applies to Shia women, who total around 6 million in Afghanistan. The argument in favor of this law is that it is an improvement upon the customary regional law imposed previously.

== Available statistics and stigma ==
Rape in Afghanistan is a crime which can be legally prosecuted, but in practice it is very rarely reported and most of laws for rape are not implemented, as such there are immense risks that women face if they report it. Rape victims in the country face a double risk of being subjected to violence: on one hand, they can become victims of honor killings perpetrated by their families, and on the other hand, they can be victimized by the laws of the country. Women are also subjected to many smaller personal risks to their social status and daily life: They can be charged with adultery, a crime that can be punishable by death. Furthermore, they can be forced by their families to marry their rapist which is especially likely if the woman becomes pregnant. Due to a number of high-profile instances, the risk of being prosecuted for Zina creates a strong incentive for women not to report being raped in Afghanistan today.

Rape victims in Afghanistan are more stigmatized than the rapists. Women who are raped can be and often are punished, while their male counterparts rarely face jail time when accused of rape. Raped women are often punished for zina under adultery laws instead of getting justice. Women are often persuaded to marry their rapist in hopes of restoring honor to her family. This is also done so the rapist can avoid facing charges. Thus putting women in the, very often dangerous, position of either marrying the man who raped and attacked them or facing honor crimes, possibly murder, at the hands of their own family members.

In 2012, Afghanistan recorded 240 cases of honor killings and 160 cases of rape, but the number for both honor killings and rapes is estimated to be much higher and underreported, especially in rural areas.

In 2013, Afghanistan made international news in regard to the story of a woman who was raped by a man, jailed for adultery, gave birth to a child in jail, and was then subsequently pardoned by Afghanistan president Hamid Karzai, as international interest and outrage grew but she was forced by Government officials to marry her rapist who claims to have rescued her from shame by marrying her. In 2013, in eastern Ghazni, a man attacked a woman and attempted to rape her, and as a result the relatives of the woman killed both the woman and the man in an honor killing. In Afghanistan, crimes such as adultery, rape and trafficking are often conflated with each other, and it is generally not acceptable for a woman and a man to be alone together (unless married or related), and if this happens the response can be very violent: An Afghan medical doctor and his female patient were attacked by an angry mob who threw stones at them after the two were discovered in his private examining room without a chaperon.

== Soviet invasion of Afghanistan ==
During the Afghan–Soviet war the Soviet forces abducted Afghan women while flying in the country in search of mujahideen. In November 1980, a number of such incidents had taken place in various parts of the country, including Laghman and Kama. Soviet soldiers as well as KhAD agents kidnapped young women from the city of Kabul and the areas of Darul Aman and Khair Khana, near the Soviet garrisons, to rape them. Women who were taken and raped by Soviet soldiers were considered 'dishonoured' by their families if they returned home.

== Afghan Taliban ==
In 2015, Amnesty International reported that the Afghan Taliban had engaged in mass murder and gang rapes of Afghan civilian women and children in Kunduz. Taliban fighters killed and raped female relatives of police commanders and soldiers. The Taliban also raped and killed midwives who they accused of providing forbidden reproductive health services to women in the city. One female human rights activist described the situation:

When the Taliban asserted their control over Kunduz, they claimed to be bringing law and order and Shari'a to the city. But everything they've done has violated both. I don't know who can rescue us from this situation.

According to Amnesty International, since the Taliban seized control of Afghanistan in August 2021, the group has violated the rights of women and destroyed the system of protection and support for victims of violence. Numerous accounts exist of Taliban fighters targeting female relatives of former soldiers of the Afghan government to inflict sexual violence. several reports detail how women imprisoned by the Taliban are frequently subjected to sexual torture, and subsequent forced abortions.

== Reactions ==
In 2013, Fereshta Kazemi played the leading role in The Icy Sun, one of the first films to deal openly with rape in Afghanistan. NBC News said that her "film breaks new ground for Afghanistan, where victims of rape can be forced to marry their attackers to preserve their families' honor".

== See also ==
- Rape in Islamic law
- Crime in Afghanistan
- Prostitution in Afghanistan
