= Hannah Small =

American sculptor

Hannah Mecklem Small, later Hannah Mecklem Small Ludins (January 9, 1903 – April 25, 1992) was an American sculptor.

== Background ==
Born in New York City, Small was the daughter of Eugene and Grace Workum Small. As a teenager she enrolled in the Art Students League of New York, studying there with Alexander Stirling Calder and Boardman Robinson. There she met Eugenie Gershoy, who would go on to become a lifelong friend. At one time married to the painter Austin Mecklem, in 1932, in Woodstock, New York, Small met Eugene Ludins, with whom she eloped to New Mexico. Her neighbor at Woodstock was the sculptor John Flannagan, who encouraged her to begin direct carving, using stones found in the area as her initial forms. Small produced a number of works for the Works Progress Administration during her career, and won numerous awards, including the Logan Medal of the Arts from the Art Institute of Chicago in 1940. She died in Kingston, New York. Her work may be found in numerous public and private collections, and her papers are archived, along with those of her husband, at the art center in Woodstock.
