= Rangina =

Rangina is an Afghan feminine given name. Notable people with the name include:

- Rangina Hamidi (born 1978), Afghan–American activist, writer and politician
- Rangina Kargar (born 1985), Afghan politician
