= Maliha =

Maliha (Urdu: ملیحہ) is a feminine given name. The name definitely stems from the Arabic adjective singular "malāḥah مَلَاحَة" which the plural variant form is "malīḥ مَليح" or "milāḥ مِلَاح", meaning "state of being gorgeous or graceful" or "state of beauty, grace, elegance". Notable people with the name include:

== Given name ==
- Maliha Ali Asghar Khan, Pakistani politician
- Maliha Hussein (born 1974), Pakistani cricketer
- Maliha Khatun (died 2002), Bangladeshi educationist, writer and social worker
- Maliha Masood (born 1972), American writer
- Maliha Zulfacar (born 1961), Afghan university professor

== See also ==
- Malha, neighborhood in Jerusalem, formerly a village known as al-Maliha (Arabic: المالحه)
- Al-Malihah, town in Rif Dimashq Governorate, Syria (Arabic: المليحة)
