= Saif Lodin =

Afghan social activist, writer, blogger and finance officer

- Born: April 22, 1988 (age 38); Kandahar, Afghanistan
- Other name: Muhammad Saif Lodin
- Education: Kandahar University; Wuhan Institute of Virology
- Occupations: Social activist; Writer; Intellectual; Historian; Government official; Blogger
- Years active: 2011–present

Saif Lodin (Pashto: سیف لودین) is an Afghan social activist, writer and a former finance officer in Department of Education in Kandahar. He became known when he started working on an educational program with Humayun Azizi, the former governor of Kandahar. The program was about to upgrade educational systems in Kandahar University. Lodin is well known among the youth of South Afghanistan, especially in Kandahar.

== Personal life ==
Saif Lodin was born in 1988 to a family of the Ludin tribe of Pashtuns in Kandahar, Afghanistan. He started his career as an IT officer with the Afghan Telecom.
