= Chaturbhuj Sthan =

Red-light district in Bihar, India

Coordinates: 26.1214616°N 85.3904478°E

- Neighborhood of Muzaffarpur
- Interactive map of Chaturbhuj Sthan
- Country: India
- State: Bihar
- City: Muzaffarpur

Government
  - Body: Muzaffarpur Municipal Corporation

Chaturbhuj Sthan is a red-light district in Muzaffarpur, a district in the state of Bihar, India. The area is said to have existed since the Mughal period and is home to more than 3,500 sex workers. It gained its name from the Chaturbhuj Sthan Temple located there.

The area has a problem with sex trafficking. The area is based around a kilometer long lane where female sex workers perform the Mujra dance for potential clients.
