= Nassima el Hor =

Moroccan television presenter

- Occupation: Television presenter

Nassima el Hor is a Moroccan television presenter, one of the best-known for over 25 years.

El Hor hosted Frankly Speaking and Clearly for 2M TV, two groundbreaking shows that discussed censorship and democracy in Moroccan society.

She devised the show A White Thread (Al Kkayt Al Abyad) and has been presenting it since it started in April 2009. The title refers to a Moroccan proverb about a mediator using such a thread to bring enemies together. On the show, people bring their private differences into the open and el Hor attempts a public reconciliation, assisted by a psychologist and a lawyer. She explains that the show is needed to fill a gap as the individualism of modern living has swept away the traditions whereby differences would be solved in a communal way, in the souk or with neighbours.
