= Shafiqa =

Egyptian rock singer (1957–2011)

Shafiqa شفيقة
- Born: Shafika Mahmoud Riad Atta شفيقة محمود رياض عطا; 1 January 1957; Tanta, Republic of Egypt
- Died: 5 May 2011 (aged 54) Alexandria, Egypt
- Genre: Egyptian music Rock music
- Occupation: Singer
- Years active: 1989–present
- Labels: Free Music; Alam El Phan; Mazzika; Sono Cairo

Shafika or Shafika Al-Tantawiya (Arabic: شفيقة) (1957 – 5 May 2011) was an Egyptian singer. She was nicknamed the "Umm Kulthum of popular songs". Her cassette tapes in the 1990s reportedly achieved the highest sales of her era.

== Life and upbringing ==
Shafika Mahmoud Riad Atta was born in the Al-Qurashi area in the second district of Tanta, Gharbia Governorate. She was given the name Al-Tantawiya to distinguish her from another singer, Shafika Al-Qebtiya. Her father, Mahmoud Riad Atta, was an accordion player and leader of the Layalina band. He named her Shafika after her grandmother.

Shafika grew up in a musical household, with her father playing the accordion for her at home. Encouraged by her family and community, she developed a passion for music and singing. Her father became both her teacher and mentor, often taking her to events such as parties, musical evenings, and weddings. He recognized her talent early and presented her on stage when she was about 13 years old.

She began her artistic career in Tanta with the Layalina band, led by her father, alongside lyricist Ahmed Hosni and composer Amin Gad, who became known for Sandoubi in the early 1990s.

== Marriage ==
Shafika married five times but did not have children. Her first husband was Hoda Al-Rashidi. Her second husband was Shokoko, whom she met in Zagazig during a wedding. Her third marriage was to Mustafa Rashad, and her fourth was to a member of the family of musician Hassan Esh Esh. Her fifth husband, Mohamed Hosni from Alexandria, was reported to have influenced her decision to retire in 2004. She returned to performing in 2008 after her retirement ended.

== Career ==
Shafika began singing in 1970 at the age of 13 in Tanta, where she performed with the Layalina troupe led by her father, Mahmoud Riad Atta. Her early performances, often at weddings and local events, quickly attracted attention. She released her first album in 1980, which achieved significant success on cassette tapes and earned her the nickname "The Cassette Sultana." Her popularity spread across Egypt and other Arab countries, as well as in parts of Asia, particularly Thailand, where she gained considerable fame.

In the 1990s, producer Ahmed Fakhry of Western Audio Company released a collection of her cassette tapes, further increasing her popularity. At the peak of her career, she was reported to have performed up to seven or eight concerts per day, earning fees of about 10,000 Egyptian pounds per performance.

Her cassette tapes sold widely, and she became known for her strong and resonant voice. Media and audiences attributed various titles to her, including "The Fourth Pyramid," "The Pyramid of the West," "The Sultana of Cassettes," and "The Umm Kulthum of the People."

Sales remained strong until 2004, when she attempted to enter music production. The collapse of the cassette market at that time led to heavy financial losses, and she decided to retire from singing. She later tried to establish a seafood restaurant in Alexandria, but the venture was also unsuccessful.

After three years away from music, Shafika returned to performing in 2007, primarily at weddings and parties in Alexandria. Reports suggest that her marriage to a restaurant owner in Alexandria contributed to her financial difficulties, as he allegedly used her money for business investments.

She settled permanently in Alexandria and continued singing until 2010, when her health began to decline. She suffered a heart attack and was hospitalized in intensive care before dying in May 2011.
