= Fereshteh Jan =

Fereshteh Jan فرشته جان
- Village
- Location within Iran
- Coordinates: 28°13′05″N 53°56′16″E
- Country: Iran
- Province: Fars
- County: Larestan
- Bakhsh: Juyom
- Rural District: Juyom

Population (2006)
  - Total: 601
- Time zone: UTC+3:30 (IRST)
  - Summer (DST): UTC+4:30 (IRDT)

Fereshteh Jan (Persian: فرشته جان, also Romanized as Fereshteh Jān; also known as Fereshtehjūn and Fereshteh Khān) is a village in Juyom Rural District, Juyom District, Larestan County, Fars province, Iran. At the 2006 census, its population was 601, in 111 families.
