= Azizullah Lodin =

Afghan politician (1939–2015)

Dr. Azizullah Lodin
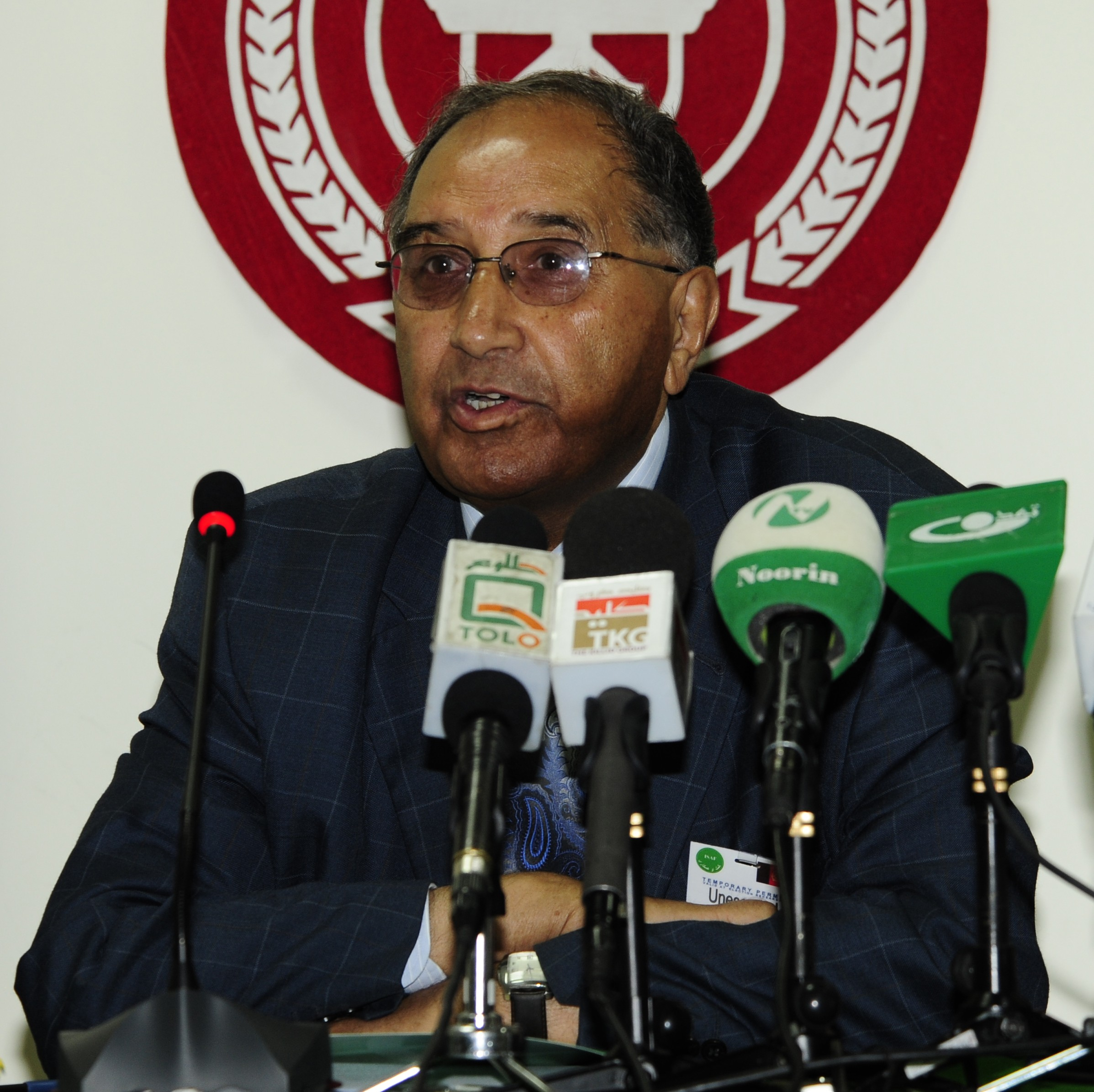
- Azizullah Ludin speaking in July 2009
- Born: 1939; Herat, Afghanistan
- Died: January 4, 2015 (aged 75–76); United States
- Occupation: Head of the Independent Election Commission of Afghanistan
- Years active: 23 January 2007 –

Dr. Azizullah Lodin (Pashto: داکترعزیزالله لودین; 2015–1939) was the head of the Independent Election Commission of Afghanistan.

== 2009 Afghan presidential election ==
Following allegations of fraud during the 2009 Afghan presidential election which he oversaw, presidential candidate Abdullah Abdullah called for the sacking of Lodin, saying that he had "no credibility". In the days prior to the release of the final election results, Lodin repeatedly met with President Hamid Karzai as the Afghan Independent Election Commission was challenging the findings of the auditors on the UN-backed Electoral Complaints Commission. Karzai rejected the call by Abdullah, stating "the changes would not be helpful to the elections and the country". He died at the age of 75 or 76 on January 4, 2015.
