= Fereshta Kazemi =

Afghan–born American film actress

Fereshta Kazemi is an Afghan–born American film actress.

== Early life ==
Born in Kabul, Afghanistan, Kazemi moved to the U.S. with her family. She was raised in New York and the California Bay Area. After high school, Kazemi won an acting and academic scholarship to Marymount Manhattan College in NYC, where she studied acting and writing. Kazemi also earned a degree in Philosophy & Cultural Anthropology from the University of California, Davis. She continued graduate acting and screenwriting studies at Academy of Art University and earned an MBA from Chapman University, emphasizing in Film Production.

== Career ==
In 2009, Kazemi held a lead role in Heal, a film about conflict in Afghanistan which has won over twenty international and domestic film festival awards, including winner of the Best Science Fiction/Fantasy Category at the San Diego Comic-Con International Film Festival (2011), winner of the Frank D. Capra award (2011), and the Humanitarian Award at the Cleveland International Film Festival (2011).

In 2014, Kazemi was the main character in Targeting, a U.S. psychological thriller feature film playing a young Afghan immigrant wife in the U.S. Kazemi. In this film she performed the first on screen kiss for an Afghan actress and was called a "trailblazer" by NBC.

Kazemi's work was photographed in a series by Pulitzer prize winning photographer Carolyn Cole while in Afghanistan.

In 2013, Fereshta played the leading role in The Icy Sun, a film about rape in Afghanistan. NBC News said her film "breaks new ground for Afghanistan, where victims of rape can be forced to marry their attackers to preserve their families' honor".

Kazemi is working on a documentary about Acting in Afghanistan.

In 2013, she was awarded a Best Actress Award for her role in "The Icy Sun" at the "2nd Afghanistan Human Rights Film Festival".
