= Eugene Ludins =

Ukrainian-American painter

Eugene Ludins (March 23, 1904 in Mariupol Russian Empire – May 20, 1996 in New York City) was a leading regional American painter and academic.

His paintings are in the collection of the Whitney Museum of Art, and his works have been shown in solo exhibits in Woodstock, New York, New York City, the Dorsky Museum at SUNY in New Paltz, New York, and Albany, New York, as well as in Iowa.

His representational art, often fantastic and surrealistic, fell into obscurity after 1948, concurrent with the advent of Abstract Expressionism and his move to teach at the University of Iowa. Only in the early 21st Century did he regain national recognition, posthumously.

== Early career ==
Ludins was born in Mariupol, Russian Empire, and he moved with his parents, David and Olga Ludins, to America when he was a few months old. They settled in the Bronx, where he grew up.

Ludins attended the Art Students League, and from 1928 to 1932, he lived and worked in the Maverick Artists Colony in Woodstock. There, in 1932, he met fellow Woodstock artist Hannah Small, who was then married to (but separated from) artist Austin Mecklem; later, they eloped to New Mexico, and upon returning, moved to their own house in Woodstock.

In 1937, he married the now-divorced Small, and he served as a director of two Federal Art Projects from 1937 to 1939.

From 1941 to 1942, Luden's Fish Hunt was exhibited at the Art Institute of Chicago, but did not win any awards in their annual show of American paintings and sculpture.

== World War II and later career ==
At the age of 40, he enlisted in the Army; he served in the American Red Cross during World War II in Okinawa in the Pacific theater of war. He was changed by the experience; According to the Troy Record, "the horrors he saw there would strongly influence his artistic career for the next decade and to some extent for the rest of his life." "His war experiences seep into the imagery" of his paintings and drawings, noted Art Roll.

The New York Times praised his work on July 4, 1948. The Times also noted a solo exhibit of his drawings in 1958, calling them "light ... a bit of welcome relief."

Ludins taught for many years at the University of Iowa starting in 1948, until he retired in 1969. Amongst his many students at U. of Iowa was Berta Rosenbaum Golahny. He was one of a number of W.P.A. artists who had gone to teach art at U. of Iowa, all without academic credentials, including his more famous peer, Grant Wood, although Ludins would stay there for 30 years.

He moved back to Woodstock, and lived there in his retirement from 1969 until his death in 1996.

Even in his retirement, Ludins mentored and befriended art students, including Susana Torruella Leval, director of El Museo del Barrio, and her husband, Pierre Leval, who was a Federal judge; they would be critical to the reëvaluation of his artistic oeuvre.

== Death and legacy ==
Small, his wife, died in 1992, and Ludins created a fireproof storage facility for their collective works of art. Ludins died in 1996 at the age of 92. According to Metroland, "Ludins' works languished, forgotten, in the concrete vault the artist built for them...."

In the early 21st century, Ludin's art, once "covered in cobwebs" according to The New York Times, received lost-due favorable recognition, in great part to the work of his old friends the Levals. Prices of his art were "at first consistent and now rising" as of 2012. SUNY New Paltz's Dorksy Art Museum hosted a major exhibition of his art in 2012, curated by Torruella Leval, which received rave reviews.

There followed an exhibit of about 60 of the same pieces in 2013 at the New York State Museum.
