= Fereshta Ludin =

German teacher

Fereshta Ludin (born 1972 in Kabul) is a German teacher of Afghan descent. She was a symbolic figure in the headscarf dispute in Germany from the late 1990s to the early 2000s.

== Life ==
Ludin comes from an upper-middle-class background and is the youngest of five children. Her mother was one of the first women in Afghanistan to go to university in the 1950s. After graduating, she worked as a teacher. Her father was an engineer, worked as a counsellor and later as a minister in the Afghan government. When Fereshta Ludin was four years old, her father became ambassador in Bonn. After the Invasion of Afghanistan by Soviet troops in 1979, the family went into exile in Saudi Arabia. Her father worked there as an engineer. The family lived in Riyadh. Fereshta Ludin had to wear a headscarf from the fifth year of school there. After her father's death, the family moved to Germany in 1986 and applied for asylum. After graduating from high school, Ludin studied to become a teacher of English, German and social studies. She studied at the Pädagogische Hochschule Schwäbisch Gmünd. She was granted German citizenship in 1995. She completed her traineeship with a grade of 1.3. From 1997 to 1999, she was a member of the board of Muslim Youth in Germany.

Ludin has been refused employment in the Baden-Württemberg school service by the authorities and courts since 1998 because she wanted to wear a headscarf in class for religious reasons. Her lawsuit before the Federal Constitutional Court was successful in 2003, as there was no legal basis for a headscarf ban in state law. During her legal battle, she frequently appeared on talk shows and there was intensive media coverage. In January 2015, the Federal Constitutional Court once again ruled on the wearing of headscarves by female teachers, this time in the case of a teacher and a social education worker in North Rhine-Westphalia. A blanket ban on headscarves has now been rejected, as it is not compatible with the constitutionally guaranteed freedom of religion. Only if there is a concrete danger to school peace or state neutrality, for example through proselytising, can the wearing of a head covering be banned as a fulfilment of religious duty.

After the headscarf ruling, Ludin taught at a state-approved Islamic primary school in Berlin. Ludin was one of the organisers of the first Berlin Ramadan peace march in June 2017.

== Publications ==
- Thank you, Mr President! In: Hilal Sezgin (ed.): Manifesto of the Many: Germany reinvents itself. Blumenbar, Berlin 2011, ISBN 978-3-9367-3874-2.
- with Sandra Abed: Enthüllung der Fereshta Ludin: Die mit dem Kopftuch. Deutscher Levante Verlag, Berlin 2015, ISBN 978-3943737-21-9 (autobiography).
