= List of Uzbeks =

List of notable Uzbeks

This is a list of notable people of Uzbek ethnicity, regardless of their countries.

== Academia ==
- Salizhan Sharipov, cosmonaut
- Toshmuhammad Qori-Niyoziy, academic
- Toshmuhammad Sarimsoqov, mathematician
- Habib Abdullayev, geologist
- Tesha Zohidov, zoologist
- Ubay Orifov, physicist
- Obid Sadiqov, chemist
- Pulat Habibullayev, physicist
- Bekhzod Yuldoshev, physicist
- Raʼno Abdullayeva, historian

== Business ==
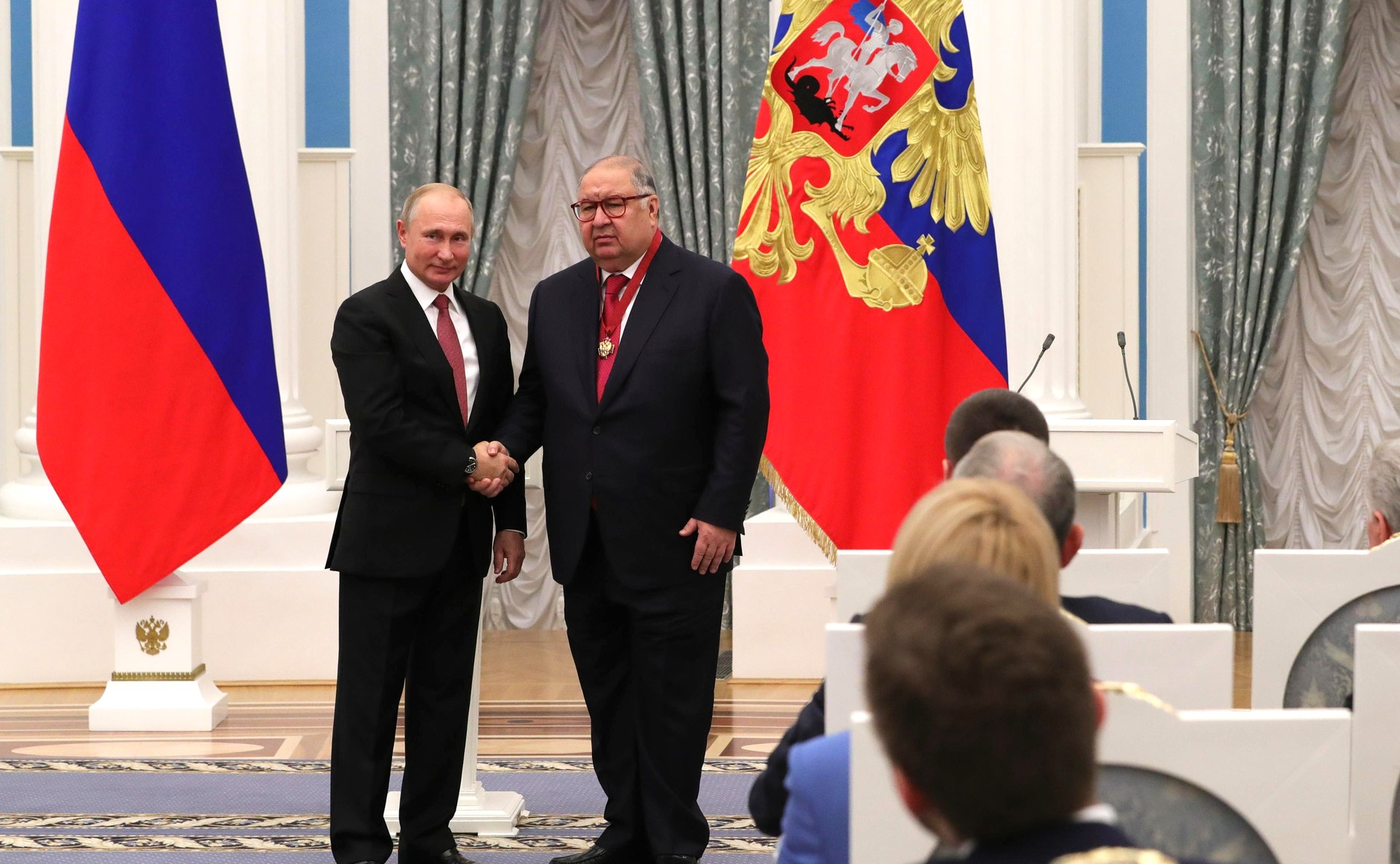
Alisher Usmanov with Vladimir Putin.

- Salim Abduvaliev, businessman
- Sherkhan Farnood, founder of Kabul Bank
- Zemarai Kamgar, founder and CEO of Kam Air
- Alisher Usmanov, businessman, oligarch, former president of the FIE
- Siyosatxon Abdullayeva, farmer and peasant (1940–2018)
- Iskander Makhmudov, businessman
- Jakhongir Artikkhodjayev, businessman
- Zafar Khoshimov, businessman CEO of Karzinka uz
- Murod Nazarov, businessman CEO of Murad Buildings

== Entertainment ==
- Lola Astanova, Uzbek-American pianist
- Sora Eshontoʻrayeva, actress
- Jahongir Otajonov, singer
- Malik Qayumov, filmmaker
- Ziyoda Qobilova, singer
- Rayhon, singer
- Muhriddin Holiqov, singer
- Ozoda Nursaidova, singer
- Muhitdin Qoriyoqubov, singer
- Tursunoy Saidazimova, singer
- Shahzoda, singer and actress
- Mukarram Turgunbaeva, choreographer
- Yulduz Usmonova, singer and actress
- Lola Yoʻldosheva, singer
- Nurkhon Yuldashkhojayeva, actress
- Farrukh Zokirov, singer, composer, and actor
- Ulugʻbek Yulchiyev, singer, composer, songwriter
- Xamdam Sobirov, singer, composer, songwriter
- Lola Zunnunova, journalist and presenter

== Media ==
- Navbahor Imamova, Voice of America journalist

Sardor Komilov, journalist, blogger, Founder and editor of the entertainment blog "Sayyod".

- Davron Fayziyev, journalist and sports commentator
- Xayrulla Hamidov, journalist and sports commentator
- Otabek Mahkamov, blogger, internet personality and Founder of "MrOtabekTV"

== Literature ==
- Uyg‘un, poet, writer, and politician
- Sylvia Nasar, American writer, economist and journalist
- Hamza Hakimzade Niyazi, author, composer, playwright, poet, and political activist
- Gʻafur Gʻulom, poet, writer, and literary translator
- Jahangir Mamatov, journalist, author, politician, political analyst, and linguist
- Ismat Xushev, journalist, author, and political analyst
- Abdulla Oripov, poet, politician, literary translator, and former head of the Writers' Union of Uzbekistan
- Komil Yashin, playwright, Hero of Socialist Labour
- Erkin Vohidov, poet, playwright, and literary translator
- Zulfiya, writer
- Abdulla Qahhor, novelist, short story writer, poet, playwright, and literary translator
- Odil Yakubov, writer
- Muhammadsharif Soʻfizoda, poet

== Politics and military ==
- Arfiya Eri, Japanese politician
- Rasul Kusherbayev, Politician
- Alisher Qodirov, Member of the Legislative Chamber of Uzbekistan

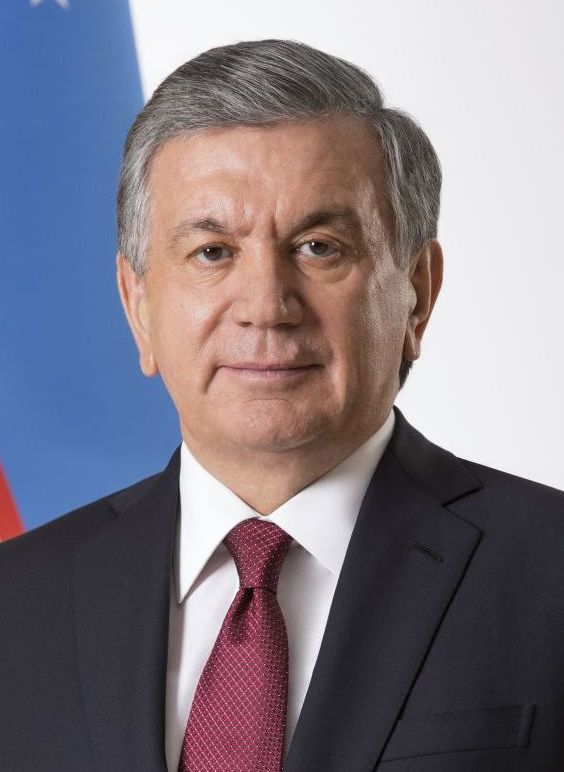
Shavkat Mirziyoyev

- Raʼno Abdullayeva, prominent leader of the Communist Party of Uzbekistan
- Islam Karimov, first President of Uzbekistan
- Shavkat Mirziyoyev, current President of Uzbekistan
- Muhammad Yunus Nawandish, was the Mayor of Kabul from after his appointment by Afghan President Hamid Karzai in January 2010
- Abdul Rashid Dostum, former Afghan warlord of Uzbek ethnicity
- Abdulla Aripov, current Prime Minister
- Komil Allamjonov, Press secretary of the President of Uzbekistan
- Saida Mirziyoyeva, Uzbek politician and the eldest daughter of the President of Uzbekistan Shavkat Mirziyoyev
- Abdul Rauf Ibrahimi, Uzbek politician from Afghanistan
- Abdusamat Taymetov, first Uzbek pilot
- Alla Anarov, supreme soviet deputy and double Hero of Socialist Labour
- Azad Beg, Abdul Waris Karimi, was an Uzbek doctor serving in the Pakistan Army
- Muhammad Khudayar Khan, ruler of Kokand
- Nasruddin Khan, last ruler of Khanate of Kokand, who was settled in Peshawar after Khanate was abolished
- Khan Jahan Ali, Khan-i-Azam of Khalifatabad
- Gul Mohammad Pahalwan, former Afghan warlord from an Uzbek ethnicity
- Sayed Anwar Sadat, ethnic Uzbek politician in Afghanistan
- Suraya Dalil, Afghan physician and politician
- Husn Banu Ghazanfar, is a politician in Afghanistan, formerly served as the Minister of Women's Affairs
- Delbar Nazari, is an Afghanistan politician who serves as Minister for Women's Affairs
- Abdul Majid Rouzi, Uzbek commander of Arab Descent during the Afghan Civil war
- Mohammad Rozi, is an Uzbek fugitive wanted for shooting three Australian troops serving in southern Afghanistan and two Afghan National Army
- Ahmad Khan Samangani, was an Afghan member of parliament and a commander of the Junbish-i Milli
- Mohammad Hashim Zare, is the current governor of Samangan, Afghanistan
- Muhammad Shaybani, Uzbek emperor and warrior
- Rasul Pahlawan, Uzbek military leader in Afghanistan and Brother of Abdul Malik Pahlawan
- Kamoliddin Rabbimov, political scientist
- Fatima Payman, Australian politician

== Sports ==
- Rustam Khudzhamov, football goalkeeper
- Nursulton Ruziboev, mixed martial artist, currently competes in the UFC
- Diyora Keldiyorova, judoka
- Bekzod Abdurakhmonov, wrestler
- Nodirbek Abdusattorov (born 2004), chess grandmaster and World Rapid Chess Champion (since 2021)
- Akgul Amanmuradova, tennis player
- Ruslan Chagaev, boxer
- Anastasia Gimazetdinova, skater
- Ibrahim Nazarov, swimmer
- Mirjalol Kasymov, footballer
- Ravshan Irmatov, football referee
- Donior Islamov (born 1989), wrestler
- Oksana Chusovitina, gymnast
- Rustam Kasimdzhanov, chess player
- Sakina Mamedova, sports shooter
- Makhmud Muradov, mixed martial artist, first Uzbek UFC fighter
- Eldor Shomurodov, footballer, Member of the FC Roma
- Abdukodir Khusanov, footballer, Member of the Manchester City
- Abbosbek Fayzullaev, footballer, Member of the FC CSKA Moscow
- Jaloliddin Masharipov, footballer, Member of the FC Esteghlal
- Ravshan Khaydarov, football manager and former player.
- Utkir Yusupov, goalkeeper, footballer, Member of the Foolad F.C.
- Ilyos Zeytulayev, football manager and former player.
- Arthur Kaliyev, Ice Hockey Player

== See also ==
- Uzbek Americans
- Uzbekistan
- Uzbeks
- Uzbeks in Afghanistan
- List of Uzbekistan people
