= The Crew Is One Family =

"The Crew Is One Family" (Russian: Экипаж — одна семья) is a Soviet and Russian military march and patriotic song, which serves as the service anthem of the Russian Navy.

== History ==
In August 1972, the Central Committee of the Komsomol alongside the Radio Yunost (Youth) under the All-Russia State Television and Radio Broadcasting Company, announced a nationwide songwriting competition dedicated to the Soviet Army and Navy. Poet Yuri Pogorelsky wrote the lyrics and then approached Viktor Pleshak, then a student at the Leningrad Conservatory, who set the lyrics to music. They then submitted the track under the title "And Then" using the maritime blessing "Seven feet under the keel!".

While the song originally failed to impress the main selection panel, the Soviet VIA Samotsvety selected the song through the rejected submissions, with jury member Lev Oshanin officially renaming the piece to "The Crew Is One Family." When the song was broadcast, it received overwhelming acclaim, forcing the judges to award it the grand prize before New Year's Eve in December 1972. The track saw its first major commercial release in 1973, when it was included inside the 6th edition of Krugozor literary magazine.

== Usage ==
It is part of the regular repertoire of Russian military bands and is frequently performed at Victory Day Parades in Moscow and Russian Navy Day fleet parades in Saint Petersburg.

== Lyrics ==
=== Russian original ===
Нам нужны такие корабли на море,
Чтобы мы могли с любой волной поспорить.
Маяки нужны и нужен нам локатор,
А ещё нам верные нужны ребята.

Припев
𝄆 И тогда вода нам как земля.
И тогда нам экипаж семья.
И тогда любой из нас не против-
Хоть всю жизнь служить в военном флоте. 𝄇

Нам для службы на море нужны походы,
И приветы из дому в далёких водах,
И чтоб не терять минут свободных даром
Нам, конечно, в кубрике нужна гитара.

Припев
Нам нужны для службы якоря и грозы,
Нужен нам устав, что помнят все матросы.
Нужен флаг, что реет над волною синей,
А всего нужнее Родина- Россия.

Припев 3x

=== English translation ===
We need ships like these at sea,
so we can contend with any wave.
We need lighthouses and we need a locator,
and we also need loyal comrades.

Chorus
𝄆 And then water is like land to us.
And then the crew is like family to us.
And then none of us would mind
serving in the navy our whole lives. 𝄇

For our service at sea we need expeditions,
And greetings from home in distant waters,
And so as not to waste free minutes in vain
We, of course, need a guitar in the cockpit.

Chorus
We need anchors and thunderstorms for our service,
We need the regulations that all sailors remember,
We need a flag that flutters over the blue waves,
And most of all we need our Motherland - Russia.

Chorus 3x

== See also ==
- Soviet music
- Alexandrov Ensemble
- Russian Navy
- Air March
- March of the Ukrainian Navy
