= Shia Personal Status Law =

2009 Afghan law

The Shia Personal Status Law, also known as the Shia Family Law, is a law of Afghanistan that was approved in February 2009 with Afghan President Hamid Karzai's signature. The law, which was written in collaboration with Shiite religious leaders, codified customs relating to marriage, family, and inheritance. The law only affects the Shia denomination of Afghanistan, encompassing approximately six million people. Family issues had previously been decided by customary law.

While the law faced heavy international criticism for its perceived sexism, Afghan legislators who supported the law argued that it protected women's role in society. Female legislators and women's rights groups complained about a lack of transparency and limited opportunity for debate in the process of the drafting and passing the law. Shia officials claimed that the law preserved the distinctions which are inherent between the Shia and Sunni Muslim religions of Afghanistan.

Portions of the law pertaining to women's obligation in marriage made international headlines. The United Nations Development Fund for Women, NATO, Canada, United States, Germany and other nations came forward asking for a review of the law, as it was felt that it oppresses Shiite women, taking away many of their rights in a marital relationship. Most controversially, Article 132 specifies that Shia women are required to sexually submit to their husband's demands and are expected to have intercourse with their husband at least once every four days except in case of illness, in what has been described as spousal rape.

== Passage and response ==
The original draft, sponsored by the high ranking Shia cleric Asif Mohseni, was sent to parliament in 2006 where it stayed for almost 3 years. After some modifications, the bill was approved by the lower house of the Afghan parliament on 7 February 2009, and then in the upper house later the same month. Senator Humeira Namati affirmed that the legislation was sent to the Supreme Court without debate or reading in the Upper House. Further, the bill was passed as a package; the typical procedure in the legislature was to vote on items article by article. The law violated the gender equality provisions of the Afghan constitution.

The bill was passed ahead of a presidential election in August 2009. Hazaras, who constitute the majority of Afghanistan's Shia population, were expected by many to be the deciding bloc in the election's outcome. Karzai's approval ratings going into election season were low, particularly among this key constituency. Critics of the bill feel that it was passed to appease Shia clerics and Islamic fundamentalists.

While the law was celebrated among Shia fundamentalists, the International community broadly opposed the bill. Many opponents compared the legislations to laws put into place during the first Taliban regime due to provisions prohibiting women from leaving the house without their husband's permission or denying their husbands intercourse, with narrow exceptions. Many western leaders and multiple UN bodies condemned the law. Critics worried that the passage of the law indicated that human rights protections in Afghanistan were backsliding, and that the nation was falling through on its commitments to international law, particularly the CEDAW treaty.

In response to the law's passage, an international conference was held in The Hague regarding Afghanistan at the end of March 2009. The conference, named A Comprehensive Strategy in a Regional Context, started on 31 March 2009, and analyzed the political, security and development issues faced by the international community in Afghanistan.

In response to international criticism, President Karzai acknowledged concerns but ultimately dismissed them, saying that "if there is anything that is of concern to us" they would consult with religious leaders about amendments.

In April 2009, protestors took to the streets of Kabul to voice opposition to the law. About 200 women protestors made it to the protest after many were held back by husbands, and not allowed access to public transit. Between 800 and 1,000 counter-demonstrators from a local madrasa swamped the women's protest, who were supporters Asif Mohseni. Counter-protestors in some instances threw stones at demonstrators. They argued that the law was in line with Sharia, and therefore opposition was anti-Islamic. The protesters included Afghan member of Parliament Sabrina Saqeb. When the protest reached the parliamentary grounds, a signed petition was presented.

== Amendment ==
On April 7, 2009, Karzai vowed to change the law if it was found to go against the constitution or Islamic law. After initial resistance to criticism, the law was placed before the Justice Minister and the top religious leaders for review. Shia clergy defended the new law, and felt that the international community misinterpreted the legislation. Karzai attributed the international outcry to poor translation.

The third article of the constitution states that no law will transgress against the Islamic religion followed in Afghanistan. The constitution provides a mandate in article seven that the Islamic Republic shall adhere to the Universal Declaration of Human Rights (UDHR) and to other international treaties and conventions which is signatory to. Under Article 22 of the constitution of Afghanistan, equality between the sexes is recognised.

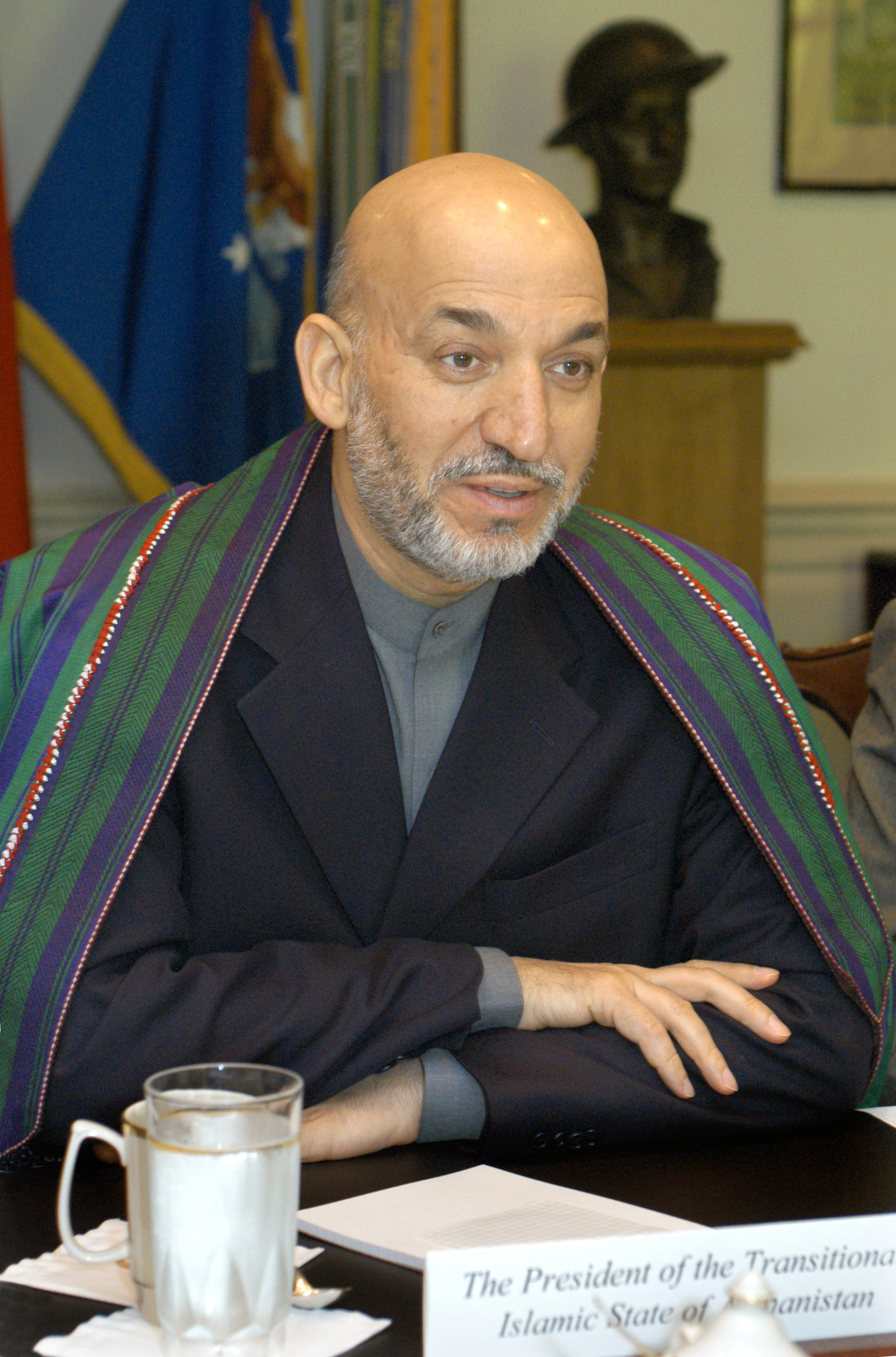
Afghan President Hamid Karzai

A copy of the bill since it was originally drafted was changed. The age of marriage for women has been changed from nine years old to sixteen. The age at which a mother can keep custody of her daughter after a divorce was raised from seven to nine years old. Politicians in the lower house of Parliament was able to remove the law's stipulation for temporary marriages. Another amendment from the first draft allowed women to leave the house without a male relative to go to work, school, or for medical treatment.

However, there was little recognition of these changes internationally, where it was felt that the main problems with the law were left unaddressed.

== See also ==
- War in Afghanistan (2001–present)
- Sunni-Shia relations relating to Afghanistan
- Religion in Afghanistan
- Human rights in Afghanistan
- Qadria Yazdanparast, Afghan Human Rights Activist
