= Bibiniso Boltaboyeva =

- Born: 17 March 1913
- Died: 24 May 2004 (aged 91)
- Citizenship: Russian Empire → USSR → Uzbekistan
- Spouse: Abdusamat Taymetov

Bibiniso Shamuratovna Boltaboyeva (17 March 1913 – 24 May 2004) was one of the first women parachutists of Uzbekistan; she made her parachute jump ten days after Basharat Mirbabayeva. A textile worker by trade, she was later elected to her local city council.

She met her husband Abdusamat Taymetov at the aeroclub where she learned to parachute. She is buried next to him in the Chigatai cemetery.
