= Curse of Timur =

Rumor of curse on the tomb of Timur

The Curse of Timur or the Curse of Tamerlane (Russian: Проклятие Тамерлана) is the rumor that the tomb of Timur is cursed such that whoever disturbs it will face a calamity. A popular version of the story of the curse holds that when Soviet anthropologists opened the tomb in June 1941, they found an inscription saying that whoever opened it would unleash an invader worse than him. The tomb was opened on June 20, 1941. On June 22, 1941, Operation Barbarossa commenced, leading many people to believe that it was caused by the curse. In addition, the Soviet victory in the Battle of Stalingrad has been credited to the curse being broken by Timur getting a reburial about one month before the victory in the battle.

== Background ==
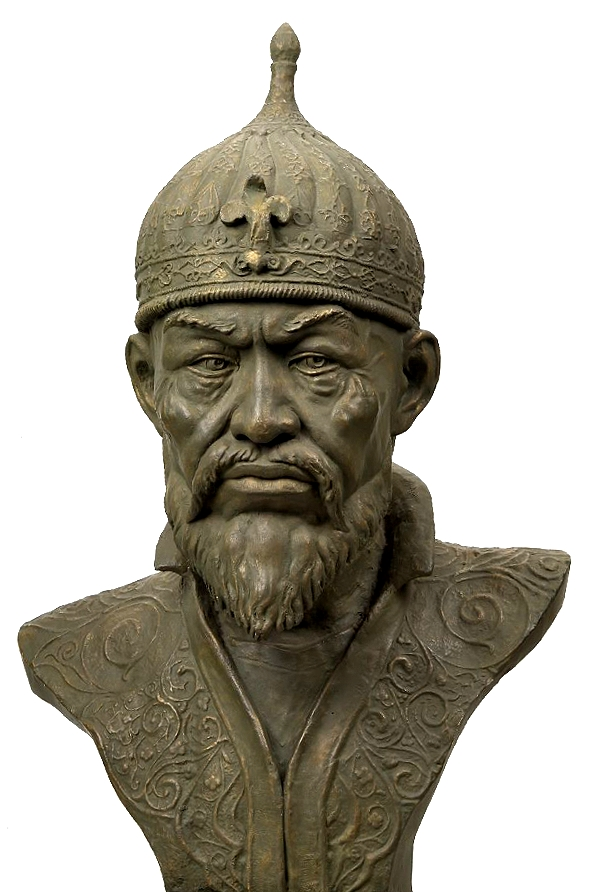
Facial Reconstruction of Timur (Tamerlane)

Timur or Tamerlane was a Turco-Mongol conqueror and warrior who founded the Timurid Empire in and around modern-day Afghanistan, Iran, and Central Asia, becoming the first ruler of the Timurid dynasty. He was buried in Gur-e-Amir, Samarkand, located in present-day Uzbekistan.

== Examples of situations attributed to the curse ==
=== 1740 ===
In 1740 Nader Shah, who was fascinated by Timur, tried to take the sarcophagus, breaking it, and took a jade slab from the tomb. Soon afterwards his son became very ill and after continuing to face calamities he returned the stone per the suggestion of his advisors. His son eventually recovered from the illness.

=== 1941 ===
In June 1941 Soviet anthropologists made an expedition to open the tomb of Gur-e-Amir ordered by Joseph Stalin to confirm if it was really the tomb of Timur as it was said to be, and to study the remains of Timur. The expedition was led by Russian anthropologist Mikhail Gerasimov and included many members of Central Asian intelligentsia including Toshmuhammad Qori-Niyoziy, Yahyo Gulomov, Khodi Zarifov, Sadriddin Ayni as well as Russian academics such as Aleksandr Semyonov, Mikhail Masson, Lev Oshanin, Valentina Zezenkova, Boris Zasypkin, Vasily Kononov, and Vasily Shishkin. A group of journalists and cameramen joined the expedition to film and document the process, consisting of Mikhail Sheverdin from Pravda, I.P. Savalin as a still photographer, Nikolai Kim as the leader of the film brigade, Malik Qayumov as cameraman, and Arif Tursunov, Kazem Mukhamedov, and Pavel Marshalov as assistants.

Different accounts agree that before the tomb was opened, three old men approached Sadriddin Ayni, handed him a manuscript said to be very old and claimed that the manuscript said that the tomb could not be opened because of a curse. However, it was not an ancient script, but the Jangnoma book of local legends from the 19th century. The men begged them not to open the tomb, but Ayni shooed them away with a stick and attributed the idea of a curse as a story created after the death of Timur to deter grave robbers, and other members of the crew inspected the manuscript. In 2004, Qayumov gave an interview with a documentary crew and mentioned the three old men who approached the crew at the teahouse, and Sadriddin Ayni's son Kamal also confirmed the existence of the three men at the teahouse who handed the manuscript purported to contain a curse, but mention that Qayumov was unable to read the script since it was Persian and he was unfamiliar with the language.

Much like the story of the Curse of King Tut, a foul smell emitted from the tomb when it was opened, and the crew experienced technical difficulties: the lights went out but came back on and the electrician was unable to determine a cause. Just a few days after the tomb was opened, Nazi Germany invaded the Soviet Union, leading to many people believing in the curse. (Note: The exact date that the coffin was opened varies between sources, usually indicated as 19 June, 20 June or 21 June, possibly due to the time differences between Samarkand and Moscow and the process taking multiple days; excavation began on 16 June but the coffin was opened later.)

Eventually word of the supposed curse reached Stalin (Note: Who passed the word of the curse to Stalin is disputed. Some sources say that Mikhail Gerasimov informed Stalin of the curse, but Malik Qayumov claimed that Georgy Zhukov told Stalin about the curse after he told Zhukov about the curse and begged him to tell Stalin about it.) who ordered that a special transport aircraft be provided to return Timur to his tomb in Samarkand. In November 1942, Timur was reburied with Islamic rites. Five weeks later, not a few days as often claimed, the Red Army experienced its first major victory by winning the Battle of Stalingrad, turning the tide of the war, which was credited to the lifting of the curse. One version of the story says that the special transport aircraft made a detour to fly over Stalingrad.

== Media coverage and disputes in story ==
Different accounts claim that different phrases were carved in the tomb and coffin. It has been said that the jade slab that Nadir Shah tried to take said "When I rise from the dead the world shall tremble" and that the coffin that the Soviet anthropologists opened supposedly had "Whomsoever opens my tomb shall unleash an invader even more terrible than myself" inscribed on the inside. In reality, there is no curse carved on the inside of the coffin or the jade slab tomb, but rather a simple Islamic prayer in the coffin and the jade slab just had a list of ancestors of Timur.

The first publication in the Soviet Union of the story of the curse in detail was an article in Zvezda Vostoka in 1990, and it was later the subject of a 2004 documentary directed by Aleksandr Fetisov that aired on the TV channel Rossiya. The documentary did an interview with Malik Qayumov, the cameraman and last surviving member of the excavation crew, who mentioned the three men at the teahouse. Sadriddin Ayni's son Kamal also confirmed the existence of the three men at the teahouse but disputed Qayumov's version of events and insisted that Qayumov could not have understood the conversation since it was in Tajik, not Uzbek but did not dispute that the men did not want the tomb opened.

Later, an article in Pravda credited Qayumov with claiming that there was an inscription in the tomb threatening a war on whoever opened it, and as result many attribute the story of the curse of Timur to Malik Qayumov, however he is not the sole source of the idea of the tomb being cursed.
