= Lev Oshanin =

Lev Oshanin may refer to:

- Lev Vasilievich Oshanin (1884–1962), Soviet professor, doctor, anthropologist
- Lev Ivanovich Oshanin (1912–1996), Soviet Russian poet and song lyricist
