= Toshmuhammad Qori-Niyoziy =

Uzbek mathematician and historian

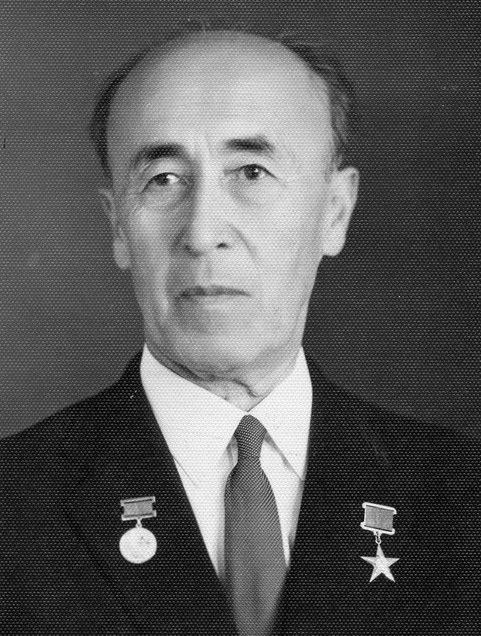
- Born: 2 September [O.S. 21 August] 1897; Khujand, Samarkand Oblast, Russian Empire
- Died: 17 March 1970 (aged 72); Tashkent, Uzbek SSR, Soviet Union
- Education: Doctor of Sciences
- Alma mater: Tashkent University
- Spouse: Oishakhon Urazaeva
- Awards: Hero of Socialist Labor

Toshmuhammad Qori-Niyoziy (Uzbek Cyrillic: Тошмуҳаммад Ниёзович Қори-Ниёзий, Russian: Ташмухамед Ниязович Кары-Ниязов, Tashmukhamed Niyazovich Kary-Niyazov; 2 September [O.S. 21 August] 1897 — 17 March 1970) was an Uzbek mathematician and historian who served as the first president of the Academy of Sciences of the Uzbek SSR.

== Early life ==
Born in Khujand on 2 September [O.S. 21 August] 1897 to a shoemaker, he initially received schooling in a maktab, but attended for less than a year due to abuse from the teacher. His family went on to move to Skobelev (now Fergana), where he eventually attended a Russian school and graduated with excellent marks in the mid-1910s. (Note: Sources differ if he graduated in 1915 or 1916) In 1917, he became a teacher at a school he founded in Kokand, which quickly became a regional school. Initially having volunteered to serve as head of schools for the Skobelev district, he went on to serve as director of the Uzbek Pedagogical College in Kokand from 1920 to 1925. Several years later he graduated from the Faculty of Physics and Mathematics at Central Asian State University in Tashkent; he defended his thesis in Uzbek.

His wife Oishakhon, who he married in 1920 in a Muslim ceremony, was one of the first women teachers in the Uzbek SSR. She frequently advised him on his philology work, including the first Uzbek dictionaries that they worked on together.

== Career ==
Whilst a university student, he was tasked with teaching advanced math classes such as analytic geometry in the Uzbek language. After graduating he continued to teach university-level mathematics in the Uzbek language, becoming the first Uzbek to receive the title of professor in 1931. That year, he became a member of the Communist Party. From then to 1933 he served as a rector at the university, although he did not receive his doctorate of physics and mathematics until 1939. He then became the Deputy Chairman of the Committee of the Uzbek SSR for Science, Culture and Art, and worked on the transition of the Uzbek alphabet to a Cyrillic script. He also devoted a considerable amount of time to researching the history of Uzbekistan and historic academic works, with a special focus on astronomy and archaeology. As part of his research about early astronomy in what is present-day Uzbekistan, he had to read through numerous Arabic manuscripts. In addition to his academic work, he held various political offices, serving as a deputy in the Supreme Soviet of the USSR for the 1st and 2nd convocations. He also authored numerous textbooks and academic papers, including the first Uzbek-language math textbooks and papers about Uzbek culture and society.

== World War II ==
In June 1941, he led alongside Mikhail Gerasimov a scientific expedition to examine the tomb of Timur in Samarkand. According to local legend, an inscription on the tomb threatened to bring about a catastrophe to whoever opened it, and shortly after it was opened, Nazi Germany began invading the Soviet Union. After the remains were reburied with Muslim rites in 1942, some in Uzbekistan credited the Soviet victory in the Battle of Stalingrad to the reburial.

After the German invasion of the Soviet Union, his only son Shavkat applied to go to the frontlines with the Red Army. Being skilled in mathematics like his father, he was chosen for artillery school. After surviving the war, Shavkat went on to graduate from the F.E. Dzerzhinky Military Academy and follow in his father's footsteps with a career in mathematics, but specialized in ballistics and rocket technology.

When the Academy of Sciences of the Uzbek SSR was established in 1943, Qori-Niyazov was made its first president and held the post until 1947.

== Postwar ==
In 1946 Qori-Niyoziy became a professor at the Tashkent Institute of Engineers and Agricultural Mechanization. For his paper "Ulugbek's Astronomical School" he was awarded the Stalin Prize. In 1954 he became a member of the International Astronomical Union, in 1967 he became a corresponding member of the International Academy of the History of Science, and that same year on 1 September he was awarded the title Hero of Socialist Labour for his work promoting academics in the Uzbek SSR. His work included serving as editor-in-chief of the Uzbek science magazine Fan va turmush and deputy chairman of the board for preserving historic and cultural monuments of Uzbekistan. During the course of his work, he travelled to various foreign countries including Afghanistan, Bulgaria, India, Italy, and Japan. He died on 17 March 1970 and was buried in the Chigatoy Cemetery.

== Awards and honors ==
- Honoured Scientist of the Uzbek SSR (1939)
- Three Orders of Lenin (4 November 1944, 1 March 1965, 1 September 1967)
- Three Orders of the Red Banner of Labour (23 January 1946, 16 January 1950, 27 October 1953)
- Stalin Prize 3rd class (1952)
- Hero of Socialist Labour (1 September 1967)
- Beruniy State Prize (1970)
- Order of Outstanding Merit (23 August 2002)
