= Malik Qayumov =

Soviet actor, camera operator

- Born: c. 1911; Tashkent, Russian Empire
- Died: 29 April 2010 (aged 98); Moscow, Russia
- Awards: Hero of Socialist Labour

Malik Qayumovich Qayumov (Note: The Russified form of his name is typically written as Малик Каюмович Каюмов, romanized as Malik Kayumovich Kayumov. Because his father’s name was Abduqayum, is patronymic should have been Abduqayumovich, but most publications render his name as Malik Qayumovich Qayumov in Uzbek (Малик Қаюмович Қаюмов in Uzbek Cyrillic) or Малик Каюмович Каюмов (Malik Kayumovich Kayumov) in Russian) (circa 1911 (Note: Qayumov’s exact date of birth is unknown. There were no formal registry offices at the time, and although he was born sometime in Spring 1911, his legal birthdate was later written down as 22 April 1912) – 29 April 2010) was a Soviet-Uzbek filmmaker, actor, and the first secretary of the Union of Cinematographers of the Uzbek SSR from 1976 to 1986. He was renowned for his work filming the exhumation of Timur’s burial site. Later on he worked as a frontline camera operator during World War II and then for the Uzbekfilm studio. His films were shown internationally. For his work he was awarded many prestigious awards, including the State Hamza Prize, People's Artist of the USSR in 1967, the USSR State Prize in 1981, Hero of Socialist Labour in 1990, and the Nika Award for the Lifetime Achievement Award in 1992. He was haunted throughout his life with the belief that the opening of tomb of Timur, a process that he filmed, caused the Nazi invasion of the Soviet Union as result of the "curse of Timur" and that the war would not have happened if the tomb was left undisturbed.

== Background ==
Qayumov was born in 1911 in Tashkent to an Uzbek family. He had 13 siblings, but his father, a very religious but literate man, died when he was only three years old. His mother Sabriniso was well educated, being fluent in Russian and Arabic. Although he initially had 13 siblings, only Malik and four others lived to adulthood. At the ago of six Malik began attending an Islamic Uzbek school, a madrassa based in an adobe building where the teacher was an imam. The curriculum was completely limited to study of religious scripture, but he eventually quit and started attending a secular school whose teacher was an academic. There, he learned the Russian language and about the Russian revolution. However, it was a dangerous endeavor, as Basmachi terrorists targeted secular schools in the region. Later on in his career he made a film about the struggle of getting education in feudal times.

== Early career ==
After completing school Qayumov began his film career. Initially he worked at a film factory and as an assistant camera operator. In 1929 he had his first acting job, appearing in the role of a farmworker in Nikolai Kaldo's 1930 film "An American from Baghdad". In 1930 he moved to Moscow and studied at the Gerasimov Institute of Cinematography, where he mastered cinematography but left before graduating to return to the Uzbek SSR the next year. Initially he did not inform his family about his participation in cinema as there was a huge stigma against cinematography at the time. His 1938 film "Tashkent Textile Mill" got a Gold Medal at exhibition of international films in New York City. Much of his early films chronicled the struggle against feudalism in the region, which included a film featuring Tojikhon Shodieva, one of the first women in the Uzbek SSR to burn her veil.

== Tamerlane burial excavation and World War II ==
The excavation of Timur's tomb in Gur-Emir was conducted by Russian anthropologist Mikhail Gerasimov in late June 1941. (Note: Sources differ as to if the crypt was opened on either 19 June, 20 June, or 21 June 1941. Regardless, it is agreed that the crypt was opened very shortly before the start of the German invasion of the Soviet Union) Allegedly a carving in the crypt or inside the coffin proclaimed that whoever opened it would face (or alternatively, be defeated by) an enemy rose than Timur, although the authenticity of this claim is disputed, with others suggesting that a carving said that the earth would tremble when it was opened, and a 2003 Russian documentary suggested that the origin of the story about the curse of Timur came from a book and not a carving. Qayumov wrote in his book about the events that before opening the tomb he met a group of elders at a teahouse who warned him against opening the tomb, saying that it would cause a terrible war, but the anthropologists shrugged off the warning as a myth that was created to discourage tomb robbery. Regardless, Qayumov believed in the curse of Timur and sought to break it. Shortly after the excavation of Tamerlane's tomb, Nazi Germany began Operation Barbarossa, and Qayumov volunteered to work as a frontline camera operator. While stationed on the Kalinin Front, Qayumov managed to get a meeting with Marshal Zhukov, where he informed him about the curse of Timur and begged him to bring word of the curse to Stalin to arrange for a reburial of Timur. In November 1942 Gerasimov conducted a reburial of Timur with the proper Muslim rites, and local legends credit the subsequent Soviet victory in the Battle of Stalingrad to the reburial of Timur. Later on during the war in 1944 Qayumov was badly injured by machine-gun fire to his leg, and although he was spared amputation his leg remained weak for the rest of his life.

== Uzbekfilm career ==
Since 1946 he worked as a director at the Tashkent film studio "Uzbekfilm", where he produced over 400 films over the course of his career and trained other filmmakers. The subjects of his films ranged from movies to documentaries about life in the Soviet Union, life under feudalism in Central Asia, and documentaries about several countries in Asia including India, Vietnam, and Afghanistan. In addition to working as a cameraman he acted in various movies and held the post of first secretary of the Union of Cinematographers of Uzbekistan from 1976 to 1986 and 1988 to 1996.

Qayumov became a member of the Communist Party in 1960. He was a member of the Tashkent city council and a deputy in the Supreme Soviet of the Uzbek SSR of the 9th and 12th convocations.

His prominent works include a short five-minute film titled “Paranja” about the hujum, the campaign to wipe out feudalism and religious terrorism in Central Asia, "Afghanistan. The revolution continues" about the Democratic Republic of Afghanistan, "Tashkent, earthquake" about the 1966 Tashkent earthquake, "Samarkand is 2500 years old", "Children of Tashkent" and many others. While filming in Vietnam for a documentary he met Vietnamese leader Ho Chi Min. As a filmmaker, he was one of the few Soviet Muslims who managed to make Hajj, having been granted permission for the trip so he could film some of Mecca for a documentary. In 1982 he published is autobiography "My life is cinema". He sat as jury member in the Moscow International Film Festival and served as chairman of the jury of the All-Union Film Festival in 1966 and 1977.

== Post-Soviet life ==
After the fall of the Soviet Union, he remained active in the Uzbek film industry. He gave interviews to the press where he remained adamant that the Nazi invasion of the Soviet Union would not have happened if the tomb of Timur was not opened. He died on 29 April 2010 while visiting relatives in Moscow, and his remains were repatriated to Uzbekistan where he was buried in the Sagban cemetery of Tashkent with an Islamic funeral.

== Awards ==
- Hero of Socialist Labour (5 December 1990)
- Nika Award for the Lifetime Achievement Award (1992)
- Honored Art Worker of the Uzbek SSR (1950)
- People's Artist of the Uzbek SSR (1965)
- People's Artist of the USSR (1 July 1967)
- USSR State Prize (1981)
- State Hamza Prize (1964)
- Two Order of Lenin (23 July 1980 and 5 December 1990)
- Order of the Red Banner (1944)
- Order of the Patriotic War 2nd class (11 March 1985)
- Two Order of the Red Banner of Labour (18 March 1959 and 22 June 1971)
- Order of Friendship of Peoples (17 August 1989)
- Order of the Red Star (20 April 1943)
- Order of the Badge of Honour (23 May 1940)
- Two Medal "For Labour Valour" (16 January 1950 and 6 December 1951)
- Order of Respect of the Country (1990)
- Medal of Valor (1995)
