= Hasina Safi =

Afghan politician and women's rights activist

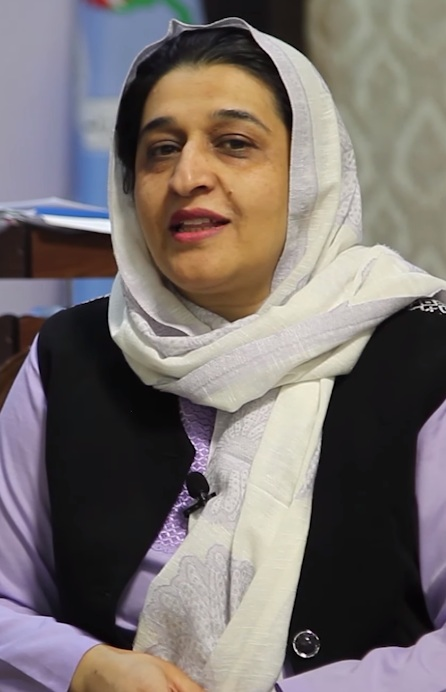
- Born: 1974; Laghman, Afghanistan

Hasina Safi (Dari: حسینه صافی, born 1974) is an Afghan politician, human rights activist, and former Minister of Women's Affairs.

== Early life ==
She was born in Laghman in 1974. She succeeded in obtaining a diploma in political science in the field of law and political science. She is fluent in Dari, Pashto, Urdu and English.
