= Ismat Xushev =

Uzbek writer and politician (b. 1958)

Ismat Makhmudovich Khushev (Uzbek: Ismat Xushev; Russian: Исмат Хушев; born 20 June 1958) is an author, politician, journalist, and a political analyst from Uzbekistan. He is a former member of the Uzbek Parliament and a cabinet member of former Uzbek President Islam A. Karimov.

On June 26, 2021, Khushev was officially inducted into the Writers’ Union of Uzbekistan.

== Personal life ==
Khushev was born on June 20, 1958, in the town of Kitab in the Qashqadaryo Region, Uzbekistan.

He's married and has four children. He was educated in Moscow State University and Tashkent State University at the Department of Journalism.

Khushev’s career in public service was highlighted by his close relationship with former Uzbek President Islam A. Karimov. Their partnership is detailed in Khushev’s autobiography, Oqlanmagan Ishonch Hisasi (The Unjustified Sense of Trust), where he reflects on the complexities of loyalty, governance, and personal conviction. While their relationship brought Khushev into the inner circles of power, his eventual dissent led to his political persecution.

Arrested three times on allegations of involvement in a coup d’état against Karimov, Khushev fled Uzbekistan to avoid further imprisonment. He initially relocated to Moscow, Russia, before seeking permanent residence in Canada, where he continued his work as a journalist and commentator.

In exile, Khushev founded Dunyo Uzbeklari (World of Uzbeks), a digital Uzbek and Russian-language newspaper based in Toronto.

== See also ==
- Jahangir Mamatov
