= Basharat Mirbabayeva =

Uzbek locomotive operator (1916–2010)

- Born: 5 December 1916; Almaty
- Died: 20 March 2010 (aged 93); Tashkent, Uzbekistan
- Citizenship: Russian Empire → USSR → Uzbekistan
- Awards: Medal "For Labour Valour" (1950); Honored Railway Worker of the USSR

Basharat Mirbabayeva (Russian: Башарат Тулягановна Мирбабаева, Uzbek: Bashorat To‘laganovna Mirboboyeva; 5 December 1916 – 20 March 2010) was a locomotive operator in the Uzbek SSR. In addition to being the first woman in the Uzbek SSR to drive a train, she was also the first Uzbek woman to parachute from an airplane.

== Early life ==
Born in Almaty on 5 December 1916. Little is known about her early life or even when she moved to the Uzbek SSR before her rise to fame. In the mid 1930’s she attended the local aeroclub while working as a radio operator for the railway in Tashkent. At the aeroclub, her instructor was Abdusamat Taymetov, the first Uzbek pilot. On 1 August 1935 she became the first Uzbek woman to parachute from an airplane.

== Rail career ==
In 1937 she graduated from training to be an assistant steam locomotive driver. Before studying to become a lead locomotive driver, Lazar Kaganovich urged women to train to drive steam locomotives, so she trained alongside 26 other women railway workers in Central Asia who entered the training to become a railway driver. In 1939 she drove a steam locomotive as the lead driver for the first time. Soon thereafter she created a women’s locomotive brigade to support the war effort during World War II. During the war, she drove deliveries of supplies from the Uzbek SSR to the frontlines. One time on 21 December 1941 she drove a steam locomotive carrying a delegation to visit Uzbek soldiers on the frontlines, which included Chairman of the Uzbek SSR Yuldash Akhunbabaev. On 11 April 1943 she represented Uzbek women at a rally of mothers and wives of combat soldiers. Just one day before the end of the war, her husband was killed.

After the war she continued to work as a railway driver, and switched to driving a diesel locomotive. In 1951 a picture of her taken at the Tashkent Railway Depot became the cover of an issue of the popular magazine Ogonyok.

== Later life ==
Initially after retiring from driving locomotives, she engaged in patriotic education with youth. After the fall of the Soviet Union she fell into obscurity and was not celebrated in Uzbekistan until after the Karimov era. She died in Tashkent in March 2010.
