= Lola Zunnunova =

Uzbek journalist, art historian, film critique and producer

- Born: 29 June 1984 (age 41); Termez, Uzbekistan
- Occupations: Journalist, film-critic, producer
- Years active: 2002-now
- Known for: Kinomaniya
- Spouse: Farhod Zayniyev

Lola Zunnunova (29 June 1984 in Termez, Uzbekistan) is an Uzbek journalist, TV presenter, art historian and film-critic.

== Awards ==
Lola Zunnunova was awarded by "M&TVA Awards" in 2007 for "The best TV presenter of the year". Moreover, she won the state organized competition "Eng ulug', eng aziz" in 2019.

== Career ==
Lola Zunnunova initially worked for state owned "O'zbekiston" TV channel from 2002 to 2007, Yoshlar TV from 2007 to 2019 and Milliy TV from 2019 to 2021. During those years, she presented TV shows like "Munavvar tong", "Kinoafisha", "CinemaUZ", "Cinemania", "Kinomania", "Allo, ogoh bo'ling", "Ehtiyot bo'ling, Multfilm", "Yo'l-yo'lakay", "Qizlar davrasi", "Dugonalar", "Liboslar jilosi", "Yosh kitobxon", "Yangi kun", "Kinoqahramon" and "Bu kino...".

Starting from January, 2019, she worked as an editor-in-chief at Milliy TV and in August 2021, she became the general director of the channel. Today, Lola Zunnunova continues her leadership and creative work at "Shukrona Media Production", her privately owned company that produces media products. She also coaches women for oratory and personal growth.

== Music Videos ==
- Habibilarim (hymn of the women's personal growth course)
