= Asif Mohseni =

Afghan Twelver Shi'a Marja' (1935–2019)

Sheikh Asif Mohseni
- Title: Grand Ayatollah

Personal life
- Born: 26 April 1935 Qandahār, Afghanistan
- Died: 5 August 2019 (aged 84) Kabul, Afghanistan
- Other name: Sheikh Muhammad Asif Mohseni
- Occupation: Marja', former Mujahideen leader

Religious life
- Religion: Islam
- Denomination: Shi'a
- Sect: Twelver
- Jurisprudence: Ja'fari
- Creed: Usuli

Muslim leader
- Based in: Kabul, Afghanistan
- Post: Grand Ayatollah
- Period in office: 1980 – 2019

Muhammad Asif Mohseni or Sheikh Asif Mohseni (Persian: شیخ آصف محسنی; 26 April 1935 – 5 August 2019) was a famous Shia cleric and the leader of Harakat-e Islami-yi Afghanistan faction or Islamic Movement of Afghanistan. He is known for writing the infamous Shiite Personal Status Law in 2009.

== Early life and education ==
Asif Mohseni was born to a Pashto-speaking Afghan Qizilbash family, on 26 April 1935, in the city of Kandahār, Afghanistan

With strong links to Iran, he studied in seminars of Najaf under Grand Ayatollah Abul Qasim Khoei, Muhsin al-Hakim and Abdul A'la Sabzwari.

== Shi'a Family Law ==
In 2009, Mohseni drafted a family law code for Afghanistan's minority Shi'a population. The Shi'a Family Law legislation was signed into law by President Hamid Karzai in March 2009 after intense pressure from Shi'a clerics including Mohseni and some leaders of the Hazara community. It gives Shi’ite men in Afghanistan wide-ranging powers over their wives. Shi’ite women must obtain permission from their husbands to leave their houses, “except in extreme circumstances.” The law also grants guardianship of children exclusively to their fathers and grandfathers.

The passing of the law brought international outrage and was condemned by world leaders including US President Barack Obama. A report by the United Nations Development Fund for Women (UNIFEM) warned "Article 132 legalises the rape of a wife by her husband".

On 15 April 2009, between 200 and 300 Afghan women protested against the law outside Mohseni's mosque and seminary. They were met by hundreds of his enraged supporters who shouted abuse and, according to many of the demonstrators, threw stones at the women. The night before the demonstration, a television station owned by Mohseni repeatedly broadcast a message advising people to prevent family members attending the protest.

The law was eventually amended before implementation in August 2009, such as the modification of some of the rules that were protested against. However some have commented that the law remains repressive.

== Religious, political, and business organisations ==
Mohseni owned Tamadon TV, a television network very similar in visual style and religious content to Iranian state-run television channels.

In the 1960s Mohseni founded a movement called Subh-i Danish (Dawn of Knowledge), whose political and cultural revival program enjoyed some popularity among the Shi'a youth of Kabul.

In 1978 he founded the Islamic Movement of Afghanistan (Harakat-I Islami-yi Afghanistan), a Shi'a anti-Soviet resistance movement and political party combining various smaller groups with numerous bases inside and outside the country. Its headquarters was originally in the Iranian city of Qum and Mohseni received support for the group from the Iranian state. The group later played an important role in the 1980 rebellion against the communist regime. Among the anti-communist resistance movements, Harakat espoused a moderate Islamist line, which brought it close to the Sunni Jamiat Islami faction, that had a similar outlook. Mohseni's movement resisted from different Afghan cities and his forces included mainly Mujahideen.

== Death ==
Mohseni died on August 5, 2019, in Kabul, Afghanistan. He was buried on August 6, 2019, in the building of the Hawzah Ilmiyah Khatam al-Nabiyin in Kabul.

== Works ==
Mu'jam al Ahadith al Mu'tabara it's an Encyclopedia that contains all of the sacred and authentic traditions of 12 Imams according to Rijal, it contains 12,000 traditions in 8 Volumes.

Buhuth fi 'ilm al-rijal it contains principles of rijal, and according to Mahdi Mehrizi, it is an enduring book about dirayat al-hadith

Mashra'a bihar al-anwar it is a commentary on Bihar al-anwar, in which he tries to separate out reliable hadiths from unreliable ones in Bihar al-anwar in accordance to his own principles of rijal as elaborated in his Buhuth fi 'ilm al-rijal. He discusses different issues in reliable hadiths

Aqa'id baray-i hami (religious beliefs for everyone)

Taqrib-i madhahib, az nazar ta 'amal (proximity among denominations, from theory to practice)

Zan dar shari'at-i islami (woman in the Islamic sharia)

Tawdih al-masa'il-i siyasi (essay of political fatwas)

Khasa'is khatam al-nabiyyin (characteristics of the last prophet).
