= Tamadon TV =

Tamaddon TV
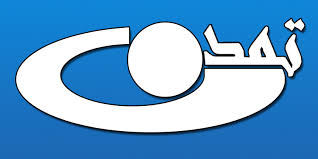
- Country: Afghanistan

Ownership
- Owner: Asif Mohseni

History
- Launched: 2007
- Closed: 2026

Links
- Website: https://tamadon.af/

Tamadon TV (Dari: تلویزیون تمدّن, meaning "civilization") is a television network channel based in Kabul, Afghanistan. The channel was founded by Ayatollah Asif Mohseni who spent $1 million setting it up in 2007. The channel broadcasts content aimed at the country's Shia Muslim minority and maintains close links to the government of Iran.

On April 1, 2022, it was reported that the ruling the Taliban banned the channel from broadcasting Iranian TV shows. On 23 June 2026, several armed members of the Ministry of Justice raised Tamadon TV's headquarters in Kabul, forcing the channel off air and sealing its offices.

== See also ==
- Television in Afghanistan
