= Nika Award for the Lifetime Achievement Award =

Russian film award

- Country: Russia
- Presented by: Russian Academy of Cinema Arts and Science
- First award: 1988
- Website: Official site of the Russian Academy of Cinema Arts and Science

The Nika Award for the Lifetime Achievement Award (Russian: Ника за «Честь и достоинство») is given annually by the Russian Academy of Cinema Arts and Science and presented at the Nika Awards. The following are the recipients of the Lifetime Achievement Award since its inception in 1988.

In 2022, nominees were announced, but the Award ceremony was postponed and, eventually, cancelled.

The Award ceremony was also cancelled in 2023.

== Recipients ==
=== 1980s ===
Year	Recipient	Profession	Ref(s)
1988	Yuli Raizman	Film director and screenwriter	
1989	Leonid Trauberg	Film director and screenwriter	

=== 1990s ===
Year	Recipient		Profession	Ref(s)
1990	—	Yevgeny Gabrilovich	Screenwriter	
1991		Nikolai Kryuchkov	Film actor	
1992	—	Malik Qayumov	Documentary director of photography	
1993	—	Iosif Kheifits	Film director and screenwriter	
1994		Grigory Chukhray	Film director and screenwriter	
1995		Tamara Makarova	Film actress	
1996	—	Valeri Frid	Screenwriter	
1997	—	Georgiy Zhzhonov	Film actor	
1998		Marina Ladynina	Film actress	
1999		Mikhail Gluzsky	Film actor	

=== 2000s ===
Year	Recipient		Profession	Ref(s)
2000	—	Mikhail Schweitzer	Film director and screenwriter	
2001	—	Vyacheslav Tikhonov	Film actor	
2002	—	Aleksey Batalov	Film actor and director	
2003	—	Boris Vasilyev	Screenwriter	
2004		Pyotr Todorovsky	Film director and screenwriter	
2005		Nonna Mordyukova	Film actress	
2006		Marlen Khutsiev	Film director and screenwriter	
2007	—	Eldar Ryazanov	Film director and screenwriter	
2008		Georgiy Daneliya	Film director and screenwriter	
2009		Aleksei German	Film director and screenwriter	

=== 2010s ===
Year	Recipient		Profession	Ref(s)
2010	—	Lyudmila Gurchenko	Film actress	
2011	—	Sergei Yursky	Film actor	
2012	—	Oleg Basilashvili	Film actor	
2013		Inna Churikova	Film actress	
2013	—	Gleb Panfilov	Film director	
2014	—	Vladimir Zeldin	Film actor	
2015	—	Liya Akhedzhakova	Film actress	
2016		Alisa Freindlich	Film actress	
2017		Alexander Sokurov	Film director and screenwriter	
2018		Vladimir Etush	Film actor	
2019		Otar Iosseliani	Film director and screenwriter	

=== 2020s ===
Year	Recipient	Profession	Ref(s)
2021	Rustam Ibragimbekov	Screenwriter	
