= Farhod Zayniyev =

Uzbek lawyer (born 1981)

- Incumbent
- Assumed office 2020
- President: Shavkat Mirziyoyev
- Deputy: Deputy of Legislative Chamber of Oliy Majlis of Uzbekistan

Personal details
- Born: 30 June 1981 (age 44) Qarshi, Qashqadarya region

Farhod Nuritdinovich Zayniyev (born 30 June 1981, in Qarshi, Qashqadarya region) is an Uzbek financier and lawyer, a deputy of Legislative Chamber of Oliy Majlis of Uzbekistan, since 2020. He is a member of Uzbekistan National Revival Democratic Party.

== Biography ==
Farhod Zayniyev was born on June 30, 1981, in Qashqadaryo region. He graduated from Tashkent State Technical University in 2002 and Tashkent Financial Institute in 2004. Moreover, in 2008, he finished the law faculty of Tashkent State University of Law. He is an uzbek nationality.

From 2001 to 2002 he worked as a specialist of Operational Management Department of O'zsanoatqurilishbank.

From 2005 to 2006 he worked as a specialist of the 1st category of the Department of Coordination and Monitoring of Targeted Funds in the Agro-Industrial Complex of the Banking Management Center.

From 2009 to 2016 he worked as a Head of Cash and Cash Operations Department.

In 2016 he was the head of the Qashqadaryo regional branch of the National Bank of the Republic of Uzbekistan.

In 2020, he was elected a deputy of the Legislative Chamber of the Oliy Majlis of the Republic of Uzbekistan. He became a member of the Democratic Party of National Revival of Uzbekistan. Member of the Commission on Industry, Construction and Trade.
