= Sabrina Saqeb =

Afghan politician

Sabrina Saqeb is an Afghan politician who served as a member of parliament from 2005 to 2010. She received media attention in 2009 when she participated in and helped organize protests against a law passed by Afghan president Hamid Karzai pertaining to Shiite personal law, with the protesters facing attacks from Afghan men for their stance. Among other things, the law required women to have sex with their husbands at a certain frequency, and required women to get permission before leaving their house. After completing her tenure in parliament, Saqeb co-founded an organization called the "Research Institute for Women, Peace and Security," and became an advocate for women's rights.
