= Mohammad Rozi =

Uzbek fugitive

Mohammad Rozi is an Uzbek fugitive wanted for shooting three Australian troops serving in southern Afghanistan and two Afghan National Army. He is also wanted for a murder case that took place in northern Afghanistan during the 1990s.

== Background ==
Rozi is from the remote Uzbek-dominated Hazar Sumuch District in northern Takhar province of Afghanistan. Ghulam Sakhi, district chief of Hazar Sumuch, described Rozi as "a bad and grumpy boy.

According to the Afghan Ministry of Defense, Rozi has joined the Afghan National Army in or about 2005.

=== November 2011 incident at Tarin Kowt ===
On November 9, 2011, Rozi was at a small patrol base about 30 km northeast of Tarin Kowt where he shot and wounded three Australians soldiers. Two Afghan colleagues also suffered minor wounds in the attack.

== See also ==
- List of fugitives from justice who disappeared
