= Raʼno Abdullayeva =

Uzbek historian (1935–2025)

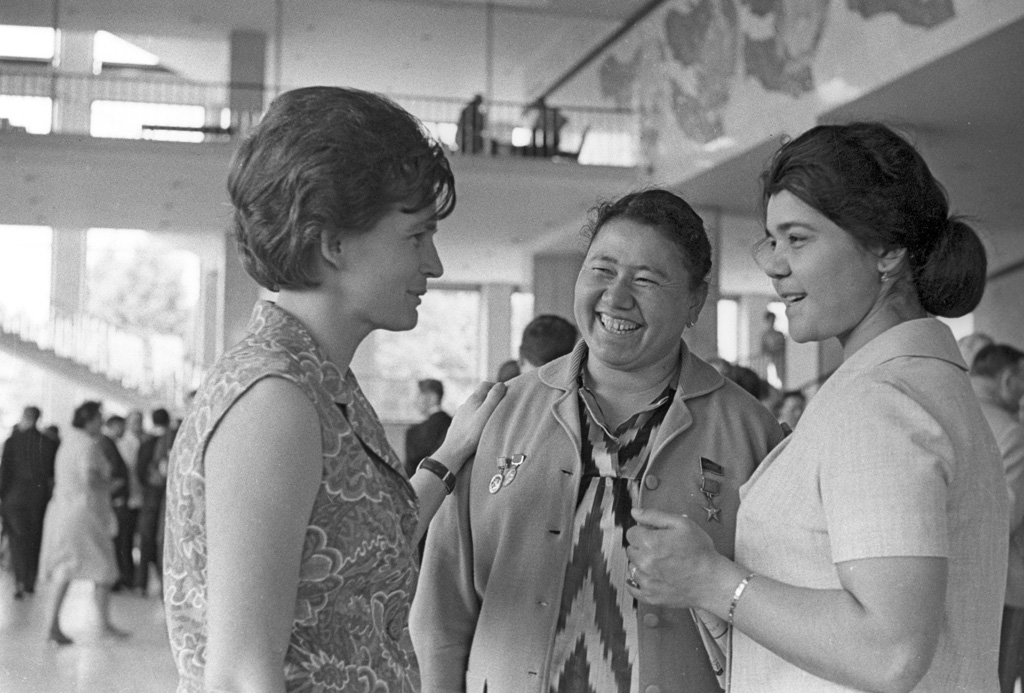
- Valentina Tereshkova, Tarsuna Akhunova, Raʼno Abdullayeva
- Born: Raʼno Khabibovna Abdullayeva; 16 September 1935; Shofirkon District, Bukhara Oblast, Uzbek SSR, USSR
- Died: 11 January 2025 (aged 89); Moscow, Russia
- Occupations: Historian, public and political figure, cultural worker
- Years active: 1955–1988
- Known for: Being a prominent leader of the Komsomol and the Communist Party of Uzbekistan, being arrested and tried in the context of the Uzbek affair, being the author of many books on the history and culture of Uzbekistan
- Notable work: Preodolenie ada (Overcoming Hell), Oʻzbek xalq maqollari va matallari (Proverbs and Sayings of the Uzbek People)
- Father: Khabib Abdullayev

Raʼno Khabibovna Abdullayeva (16 September 1935 – 11 January 2025) was an Uzbek historian, a prominent public and political figure, and cultural worker 1985 in Uzbekistan. She had a doctorate in history, which she received in 1978.

== Life and career ==
Abdullayeva was born in Shofirkon District, Bukhara Region. She was a member of the CPSU. Her father, Khabib (or Habib) Abdullayev, was an NKVD officer. From 1955 to 1988, she worked in various positions of economic, social and political importance. She defended her candidate dissertation on the topic of “The activity of the Komsomol of the Uzbek SSR in the seven-year plan of 1959-1965”. Her doctoral dissertation was on the topic of "The leadership of the CPSU in the conditions of developed socialism".

From 1955 to 1988, she was a teacher, the first secretary of the Shofirkon district Komsomol committee, the head of the department of the Shofirkon district committee of the Communist Party of Uzbekistan, the secretary and the head of the department of the Central Committee of the Komsomol of Uzbekistan, the first secretary of the party organization. She was also the secretary of the Samarkand regional committee of the Komsomol of Uzbekistan, the secretary of the Samarqand regional committee of the Komsomol of Uzbekistan, the first secretary of the Central Committee of the Komsomol of Uzbekistan, the head of the culture department of the Central Committee of the Komsomol of Uzbekistan, the deputy chairman of the Council of Ministers of the Uzbek SSR, and the secretary of the Central Committee of the Communist Party of Uzbekistan on ideology.

On 29 October 1987, she was arrested without cause by the group of T. Gdlyan and V. Ivanov and sent to the Butyrka prison in Moscow. After being declared innocent by the Supreme Court of the USSR, she was released on 15 January 1990 and returned to Tashkent. She is the author of many books on the party and youth organizations of the Uzbek SSR as a historian. Her book Preodolenie ada (Overcoming Hell) described the ordeal of her trial. She published a book titled Oʻzbek xalq maqollari va matallari (Proverbs and Sayings of the Uzbek People). She was also engaged in creative writing and wrote stories for children. She visited 27 countries on official trips. Abdullayeva was accused and tried in the context of the Uzbek Cotton scandal.

She was elected as a deputy of the Supreme Soviet of the USSR in the 7th and 8th convocations and as a deputy of the Supreme Soviet of the Uzbek SSR in the 6th, 9th, 10th and 11th convocations. Abdullayeva was a delegate of the XXIII, XXIV, and XXVII congresses of the CPSU. Abdullayeva lived in Tashkent. She died in Moscow on 11 January 2025, at the age of 89.
