= Qadria Yazdanparast =

Afghan politician

Ustad(Prof) Qadriya Yazdanparast قدریه یزدان‌پرست
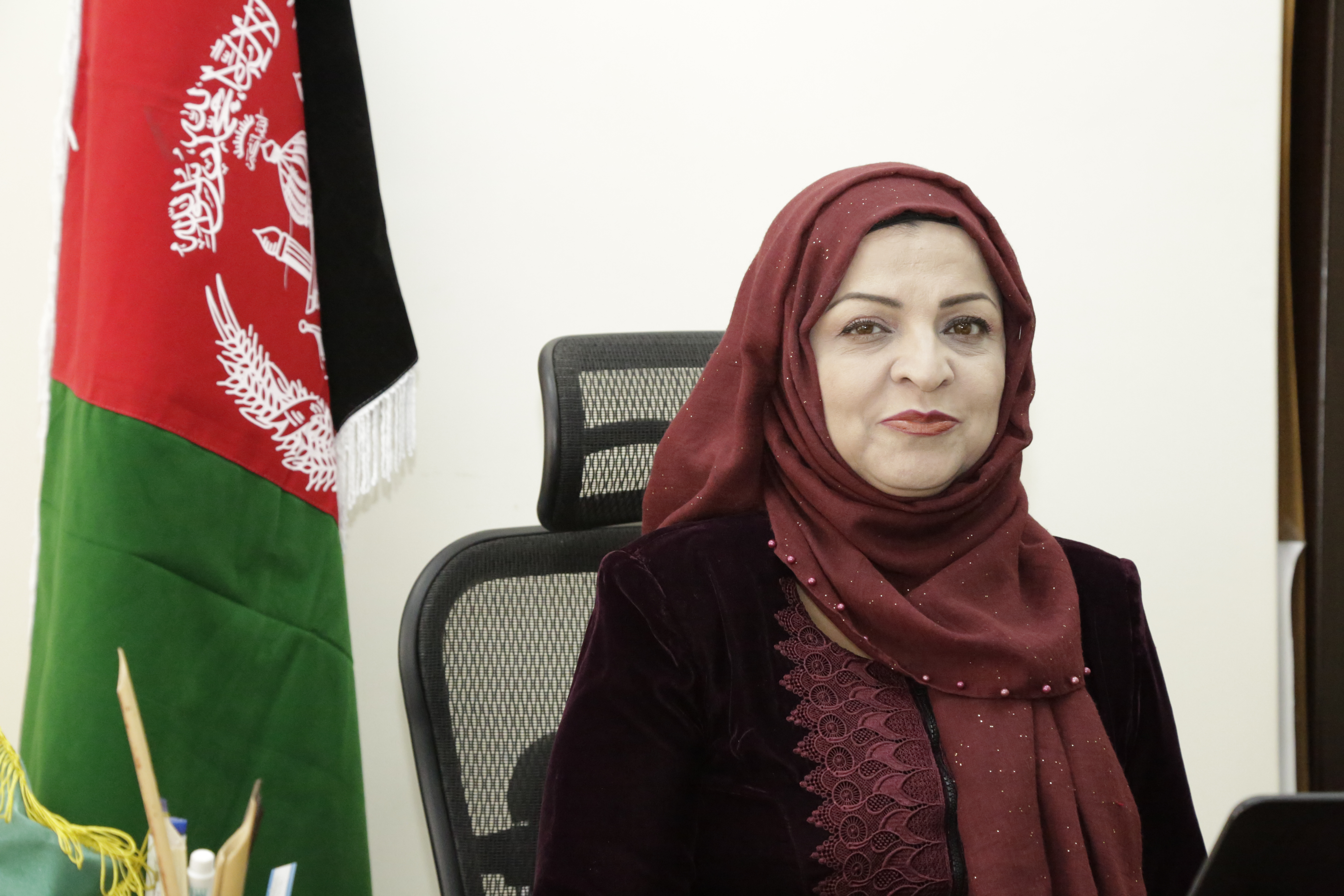
- Yazdanparast in 2017
- Born: Qadriya Yazdanparast; Kabul, Afghanistan
- Education: Kabul University
- Occupation: Afghanistan Independent Human Rights Commissioner
- Organization: Afghanistan Independent Human Rights Commission
- Known for: Politics
- Notable work: Drafting the Law on Elimination of Violence Against Women
- Children: 3
- Website: http://yazdanparast.name

Qadriya Yazdanparast (Pashto: قدریه یزدان‌پرست) is an Afghan politician and a commissioner at the Afghanistan Independent Human Rights Commission. Before joining the human rights commission she resigned from her leadership position at the Jamiat-e Islami Afghanistan, a major political party, in order to fulfill the requirement of a commissioner to be non-political. She started her career during the Soviet–Afghan War. She studied jurisprudence and political science at Kabul University. Yazdanparast speaks Pashto, Dari, Dutch and English.

== Political and social career ==
After the fall of the Communist regime, president Burhanuddin Rabbani appointed her to director of the Afghan Women High Association that preceded the Afghan Ministry of Women's Affairs. During the war against the Taliban, she fled to the northern part of the country, which was controlled by the United Islamic Front, also known as the 'Northern Alliance'. There she was able to keep her function and she continued her job and was the president of the law school in Mazar-i-Sharif. she organised an international conference on women's rights in Afghanistan. While being in Mazar e Sharif, she also organised different secret teaching groups for women under the control of the Taliban.

After the fall of Mazar-i-Sharif, she asked for asylum in the Netherlands, where she settled in Rotterdam and started a study.

After the fall of the Taliban regime in 2001 and upon the request of the former President of Afghanistan Burhanuddin Rabbani Qadriya Yazdanparast returned to Afghanistan and she could get a seat in the National Assembly of Afghanistan where she was elected as chairwomen of Human Rights commission. She became a known person in Afghan "behind the doors" politics, having relations with different political groups. During her time in Parliament she was known as being a bridge between different political rivals. She has brought in several law proposals. The law 'Elimination of Violence Against Women' was her initiative. The earlier mentioned law is also known as the EVAW law.

== Political ties ==
Qadriya Yazdanparast used her political ties with strong political leaders and heavyweights in order to draft laws for protecting women right in Afghanistan. With her religious background she did not face any opposition from the strong religious scholars in the country. The records of the Afghan lower house (Wolesi Jirga) mentions that the EVAW law (Law on Elimination of Violence Against Women) was her initiative while she was a member of Parliament.

== Former positions ==
- Leadership position of The Jamiaat Party
- Leader of Afghan Women High Association
- Legal Advisor of former vice President
- Presidential Adviser
- Member of Afghan Parliament
- Law professor at the University of Kabul

== Other functions ==
Yazdanparast has had several other positions:

- President of the 'Oldtown Kabul Committee': a committee that was founded by president Karzai to preserve the old city of Kabul
- Legal Advisor
- Writer and poet

== Actual situation ==
Currently Qadriya Yazdanparast is a commissioner in the Afghanistan Independent Human Right Commission. She is in charge of Women Rights in the commission.
