= Delbar Nazari =

Afghan politician (1958–2024)

Delber Nazari
- دلبر نظری
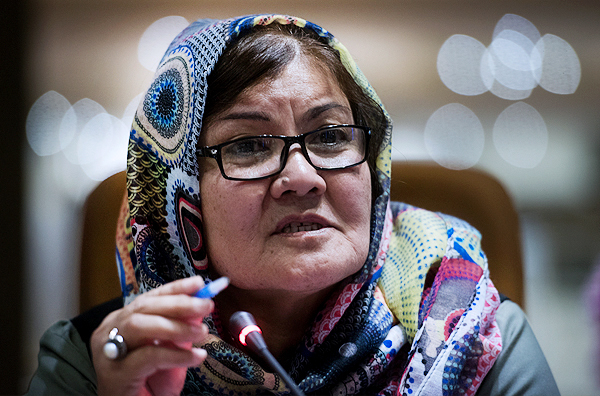
- Nazari in 2015

Minister of Women's Affairs of Afghanistan
- In office 2015–2021
- President: Ashraf Ghani
- Preceded by: Husn Banu Ghazanfar
- Succeeded by: Office abolished

Personal details
- Born: 5 March 1956 Khulm District, Balkh Province, Afghanistan
- Died: 14 August 2024 (aged 68) Calgary, Canada

Delbar Nazari (5 March 1956 – 14 August 2024) was an Afghan politician who was the last Minister for Women's Affairs.

== Early life and education ==
Nazari was an Uzbek from Khulm District in Balkh province. She had a degree from the Teachers Training Centre of Balkh and a bachelor's degree in international relations from Kabul University.

== Career ==
Nazari was a teacher and the principal at Naeem Shahid High School in Samangan and worked at Oxfam and UNICEF. She was a member of parliament for Samangan from 2005 to 2010. She worked in the Ministry of the Interior's department for the development of the electronic national ID card.

She was nominated by the team of CEO Abdullah Abdullah for cabinet of the National Unity Government, and was appointed Minister for Women's Affairs in April 2015, one of four women appointed to the cabinet at the time. Nazari's brother works as an advisor at the ministry; she said she needed him as a mahram.

On 13 July 2016, a vote of no confidence in Nazari was brought in the lower house, accusing her of corruption and professional ineffectiveness, one in a long series of such motions against government ministers. The vote was defeated.

In October 2016, Nazari appeared on an all female panel on the BBC program Open Jirga, to discuss issues of equality, despite bomb blasts and attacks in the city the previous day. On 13 December 2016, Nazari told journalists that more than 87% of women in Afghanistan were not safe, saying "Deprivation has caused a lot of threats for women across the country." Her ministry recorded more than 4,000 cases of violence against women in the previous nine months.

== Death ==
Nazari died from a cardiac arrest in Calgary, Canada, on 14 August 2024, at the age of 68.
