= Husn Banu Ghazanfar =

Afghan Minister of Women's Affairs from 2006 to 2015

Husn Banu Ghazanfar حسن بانو غضنفر
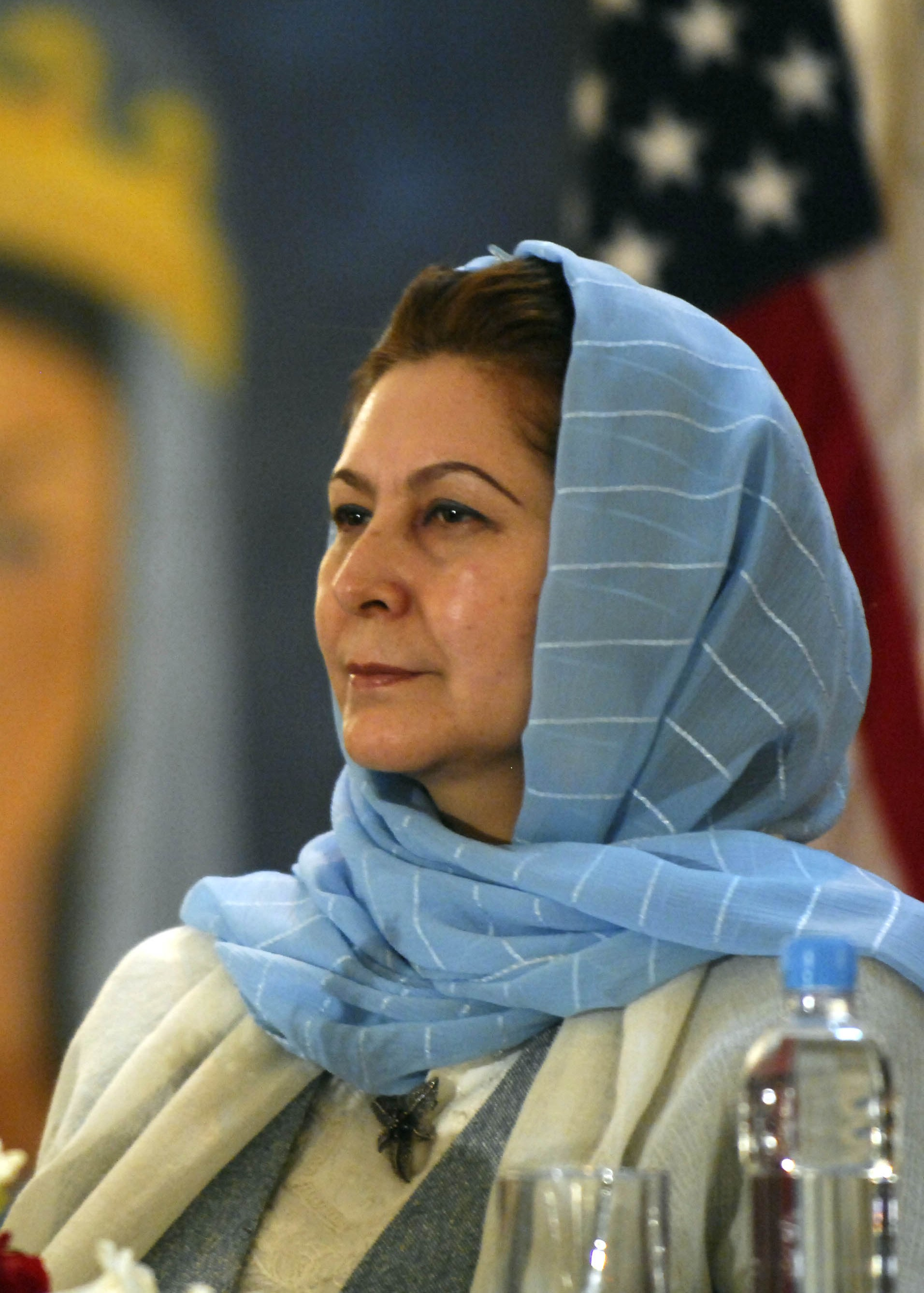
- Husn Banu Ghazanfar, February 2011

Minister of Women's Affairs of Afghanistan
- In office July 2006 – 2015
- President: Hamid Karzai
- Preceded by: Massouda Jalal
- Succeeded by: Delbar Nazari

Personal details
- Born: 1 February 1957 (age 69) Balkh Province, Afghanistan

Husn Banu Ghazanfar (Dari: حسن بانو غضنفر), (born February 1, 1957) is a politician in Afghanistan who formerly served as the Minister of Women's Affairs. She is also a writer, a poet, and a speaker.

== Early life and education ==
Gyatzan, father of Abdul Ghafar, was born in Balkh Province on February 1, 1957. She graduated from Sultan Razia High School in Mazar-e-Sharif and obtained her BA and master's degree on Literature and Sociology from Stavropol. In around 1983 she was involved in Kabul University's Literature Faculty program. About two years later, she went to Petersburg, Russia, to obtain her doctorate in Philology. An ethnic Uzbek, she is fluent in Dari (Persian), Pashto, Uzbek, Russian, and she knows a little Turkish and English.

== Career ==
In 2003, she was appointed the Head of the Literature Faculty. In July 2006, Ghazanfar received vote of confidence from the National Assembly of Afghanistan (Parliament) to become Minister of Women's Affairs.

Ghazanfar has also worked as:

- Member of the High Council of the Ministry of Higher Education
- Member of Speranto International Association of Women
- Member of the International Association of Turk Zabanan
- Member of the Board of Directors of Hakim Nasir Khisro Balkhi Association.

She has written a number of scientific articles and essays, which have been published in the national and international newspapers. She is also a poet and writes works of literature, her books are The Human Fate, Predations in the 21st Century, The Secrets of Beauty and Attraction. The book Self Realization was translated by her.

| Preceded by Massouda Jalal | Minister of Women's Affairs of Afghanistan; July 2006–2015 | Succeeded by Delbar Nazari |
