= March of the Ukrainian Navy =

Ukrainian military march

Maрш Військово-Морських Сил Збройних Сил України
English: March of the Ukrainian Navy
- Organizational anthem of the Ukrainian Navy
- Lyrics: Leonid Kuryavenko
- Music: Valery Hromtsev
- Published: 1990

The "March of the Ukrainian Navy" (Ukrainian: Maрш Військово-Морських Сил Збройних Сил України, romanized: Marsh Viysʹkovo-Morsʹkykh Syl Zbroynykh Syl Ukrayiny) is a Ukrainian military march published in 1990. It currently serves as the organizational anthem of the Ukrainian Navy.

== History ==
It was performed for the first time in 1990 under the original name "March of Ukrainian Sailors". The first performance was done by the "Grafska Prystan" Ensemble of the Black Sea Fleet, specifically soloist Oleksandr Ivanov. It got its current name on the initiative of Ivanov in 1992, upon its creation in Sevastopol. Valery Hromtsev became the composer of the music for the song. However, after the Declaration of Independence of Ukraine and the creation of the Armed Forces of Ukraine, the Black Sea Fleet saw the march as a provocation, and immediately officially banned the performance of the Ukrainian-language march.

== Lyrics ==
=== Ukrainian original ===
Перший куплет:
Нашої державності оплот,
Кримського південного кордону —
Український Чорноморський флот
Забезпечить міцну оборону.
Синьо-жовтий прапор майорить,
Прийнята присяга Україні,
Будуть вірно моряки служить
Незалежній молодій країні.

Приспів:
Браття! Послужим Україні ми!
За Чорне море станемо грудьми!
За наш чудовий і чарівний Крим!
За Український прапор, що над ним!
(повторюється двічі)

Другий куплет:
Хай завжди на морі буде штиль.
А якщо проб'є сигнал тривоги —
Моряки підуть напроти хвиль
І піднімуть прапор Перемоги.
Бачить Бог, державності оплот,
Кримського південного кордону —
Український Чорноморський флот
Забезпечить міцну оборону.

Приспів:
(повторюється двічі)

=== English translation ===
The stronghold of our statehood,
the southern border of Crimea —
the Ukrainian Black Sea Fleet
Will provide strong defense.
The blue-yellow flag is flying,
The oath to Ukraine has been taken,
The sailors will faithfully serve
Independent native Ukraine.

Chorus:
Brothers! We will serve Ukraine!
For the Black Sea we will stand as a breast!
For our wonderful and magical Crimea!
For the Ukrainian flag that is above it!
(repeats twice)

May there always be calm at sea.
And when the alarm signal sounds —
Sailors will go against the waves
And raise the flag of Victory.
God sees, the stronghold of statehood,
the Crimean southern border —
the Ukrainian Black Sea Fleet
Will provide strong defense.
(repeats twice)

== See also ==
- Anchors Aweigh
- Heart of Oak
