= Ministry of Women's Affairs (Afghanistan) =

Former government ministry in Afghanistan

Afghan Ministry of Women's Affairs
- وزارت امور زنان (Dari); د ښځو چارو وزارت (Pashto)
- Seal of the Ministry of Women's Affairs

Ministry overview
- Formed: 2001
- Dissolved: 2021
- Superseding Ministry: Ministry for the Propagation of Virtue and the Prevention of Vice
- Jurisdiction: Government of Afghanistan

The Afghan Ministry of Women's Affairs (MOWA) (Dari: وزارت امور زنان, Pashto: د ښځو چارو وزارت) was a ministry in the Afghan government which was established in late 2001 by the Afghan Interim Administration.

MOWA was the lead agency for promoting women's rights and advancement in Afghanistan. MOWA had a major shift in its strategy from welfare oriented, direct implementing approach to a policy influencing body by 2002.

The last minister of Women's Affairs, appointed in 2015, was Delbar Nazari.

With the announcement by the newly established Taliban government of the Cabinet of Afghanistan on 7 September 2021, the Ministry of Women's Affairs was dissolved and was replaced by the Ministry for the Propagation of Virtue and the Prevention of Vice.

== Functions ==
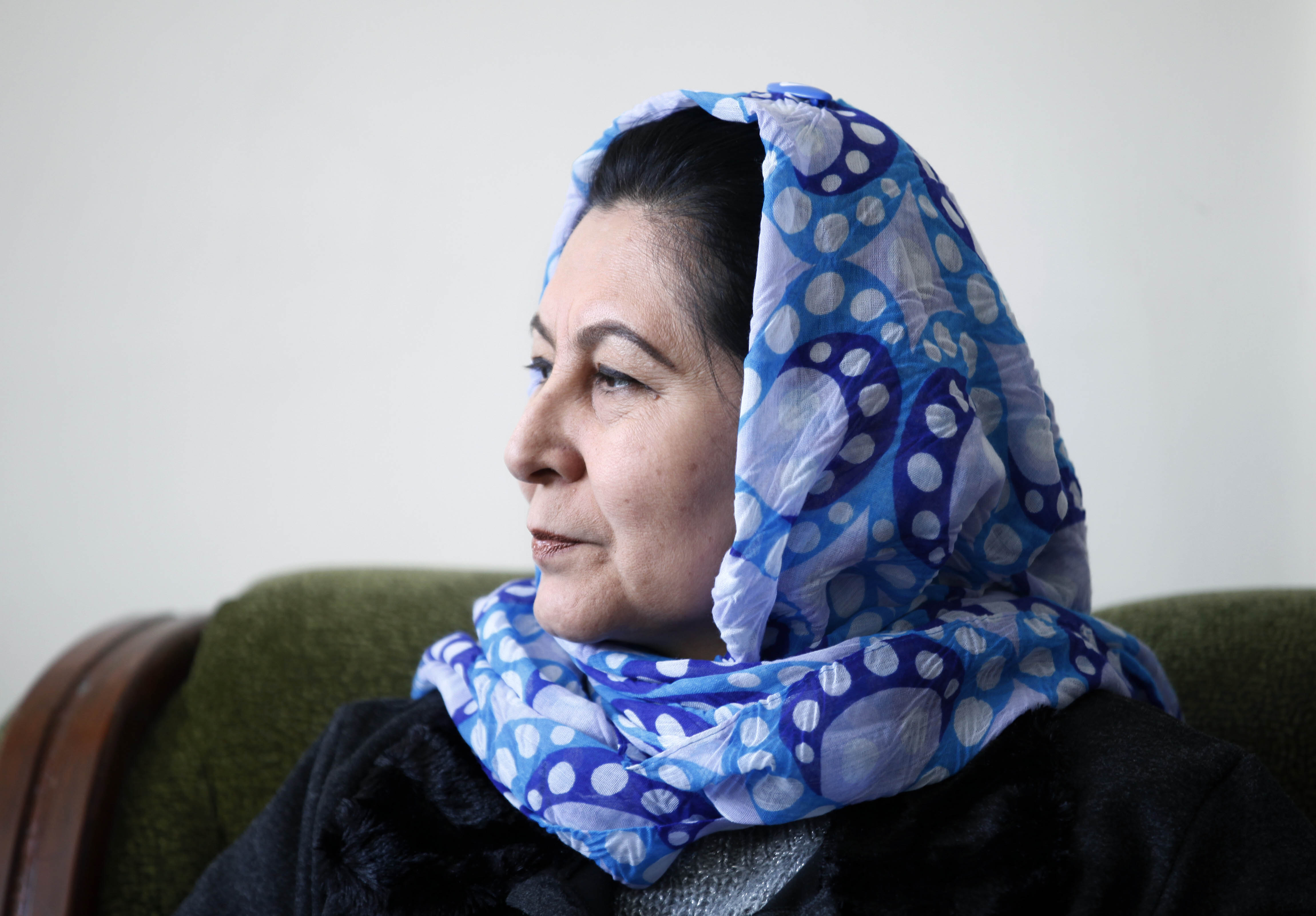
Husn Banu Ghazanfar, Minister of Women's Affairs from July 2006 to April 2015, the longest serving in the office. The department has since been disbanded.

Provide direction, build inter-ministerial collaboration and develop the capacity of government agencies to ensure that policy formulation, planning, implementation, reporting and monitoring equitably respond to the differential needs and situations of women and men. This was being done by:

1. Facilitating the setting up of gender focal points and providing them with gender advocacy skills, gender mainstreaming tools and related trainings;
2. Establish partnership with training institutions and training units of government ministries to incorporate curricula on gender in their training programs; and,
3. Facilitate the collection, compilation, analysis and dissemination of data and information that would track changes on the lives of women and men and inform policy planning and programme development.
4. Pilot and develop focused projects for addressing the needs of target groups of special concern by working in collaborative partnerships with donors, developing government mechanisms for the identification and codification of measures to eliminate discriminatory and abusive practices, and develop its own mechanism for the promotion of media/communication activities and public awareness of all aspects of gender equality and women's rights.
5. Foster partnership and collaboration with women NGOs, human rights bodies, and civil society organizations for advocacy and mutual support in making government and donors respond effectively to women's concerns.
6. Monitor government's action and prepare periodic report on the compliance to international treaties and commitments and the implementation of national policies on women.

== Mission ==
To ensure that Afghanistan women's legal, economic, social, political, and civic rights including their right to be free from all forms of violence and discrimination were respected, promoted and fulfilled.

== Structure and priorities ==
As the prime agency for women's advancement, MOWA was headed by a Minister who reported directly to the President and was a member of the Cabinet. The Minister was supported by a deputy minister for technical concerns and another for administrative and financial matters.

In the fiscal year March 2004 – 2005, MOWA had a total of 1,268 staff in Kabul and 28 other provinces. Provincial Departments of Women's Affairs have not yet been set up in the provinces of Uruzan, Paktika, Daykundi and Panjshir.

== Legal protection ==
With the adoption of the new Constitution defining the country's legal system and criteria, this department developed and expanded its work within the Constitutional framework in order to further gender equality in the country. It liaised with the Ministry of Justice and the Commission of Judicial Reform to ensure that women's human rights be explicitly recognized and protected in the judicial system and the standards set under international human rights instruments and being fulfilled.

== Women's Affairs Ministers of Afghanistan ==
Date	Name	Notes
December 2001 – June 2002	Sima Samar	Sima became the first minister of the newly created Women's Affairs Ministry of Afghanistan.
June 2002 – December 2004	Mahboba Hoqooqmal	Due to controversy around the post of Minister of Women's Affairs, President Karzai initially did not name a minister, but named just Hoqooqmal as State Adviser to the Ministry of Women's Affairs.
July 2002 – December 2004	Habiba Sarabi	
December 2004 – March 2006	Massouda Jalal	
March 2006 – August 2006	Soraya Rahim Sobhrang	Sobhrang was named as successor for Jalal, but the Afghan Afghan Lower House did not approve her candidacy and President Karzai was forced to name someone else.
August 2006 – April 2015	Husn Banu Ghazanfar	From January 2010 until March 2012 Husn Banu Ghazanfar served as acting minister of Women's affairs. In January she failed a confidence vote in the Afghan Lower House necessary for a second term as minister. However, Palwasha Hassan, who was named as a replacement by President Karzai, also failed a confidence vote, and Karzai appointed Ghazanfar as acting minister. In a vote in March 2012 the Parliament finally formally approved her leadership over the ministry of Women's Affairs.
April 2015 – May 2020	Delbar Nazari	
May 2020 – August 2021	Hasina Safi	Hasina Safi was the last minister of the Women's Affairs Ministry before the 2021 Taliban offensive

Former Ministers of Woman Affairs MOWA:

- Sima Samar (2001-2003)
- Habiba Sorabi (2003-2004)
- Dr. Masooda Jalal (Kapisa) (20041000-20060700)
- Dr. Suraya Rahim Sobhrang (200603 not confirmed by Wolesi Jirga),
- Prof. Dr. Husn Bano Banu Ghazanfar, Uzbek (20060809), nominated again (20120215) Minister of Woman Affairs (20120305-20140930) * Acting Minister of Women Affairs (20141001)
- acting Minister of Women Affairs Mrs. Sayeda Muzhgan (20141212)
- Mrs. Al Haj Dilbar Nazari (20150418, 20190615)
- Mrs. Hasina Safi (20200606) acting and nominated but not confirmed (20201130)

Deputy women affairs ministers Deputy ministers for policy and vocational affairs:

- Mrs. Shafiqa Yarqin
- Mrs. Soraya Sobhrang
- Mrs. Mazari Safa

Deputy ministers for financial and administrative affairs:

- Mrs. Tajwar Kakar
- Mrs. Najiba Sharifi
- Mrs. Sayeda Muzhgan Mustafahi, Syeda Muzhgan Mustafavi Mozhgan Mostafawi Sayeda Mujagan Mustfawi Sayda Muzghan Mustafawi (20090625, 20111128, 20121015, 20130103, 20141212)
- Mrs. Maliha Sahak
- Mrs. Nabila Musleh Nabila Muslih (20171027, 20190102)

Technical & Policy Deputy Minister:

- Mrs. Sphzhmai Wardak Spozhmal Wardak Spogmai Wardak (20190102, 20200203)

== See also ==
- Qadria Yazdanparast
