= Viktor Pleshak =

Soviet and Russian composer

- Виктор Васильевич Плешак
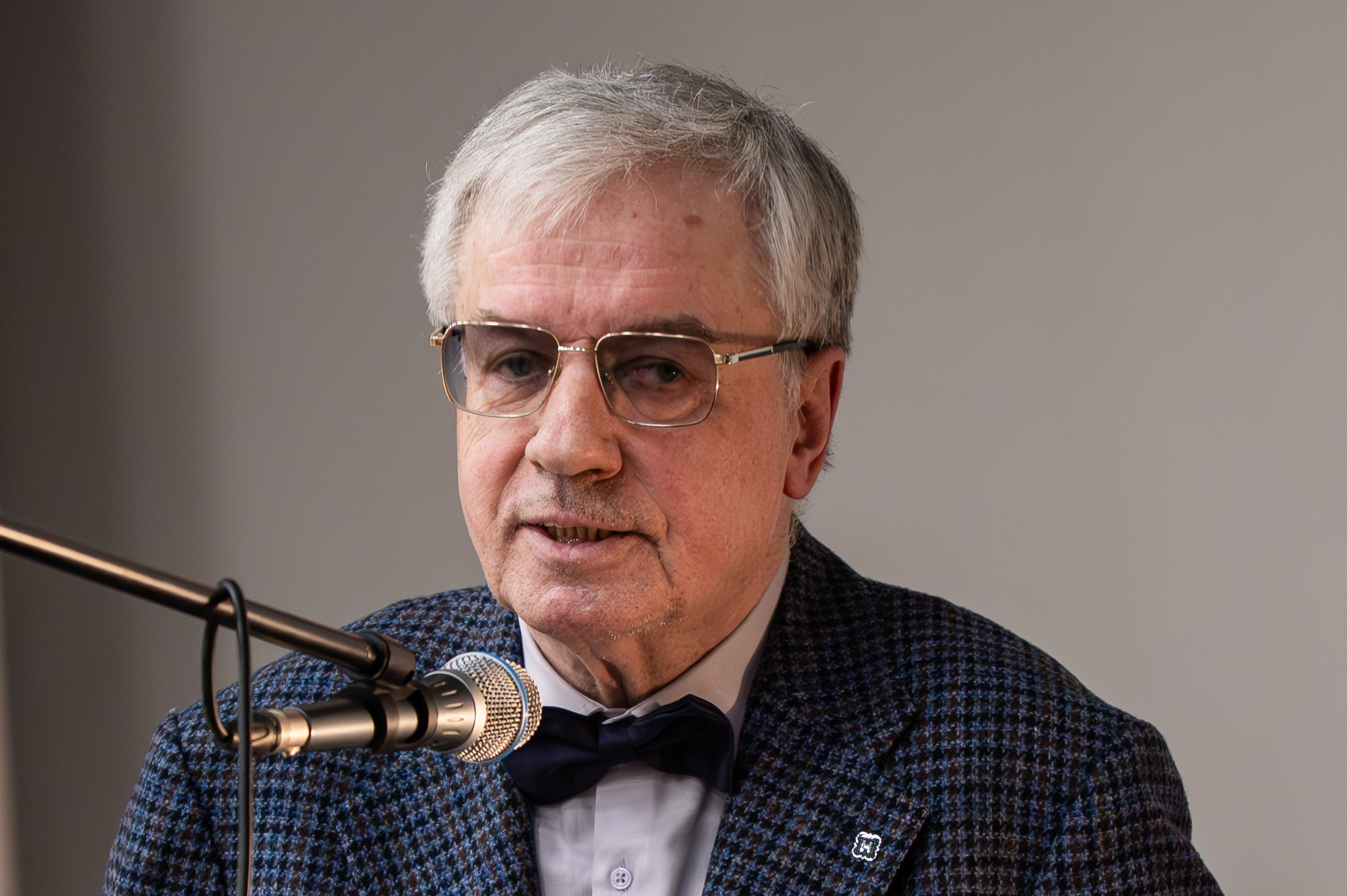
- Born: November 13, 1946 (age 79); Leningrad, USSR
- Occupation: Composer

Viktor Vasilyevich Pleshak (Russian: Виктор Васильевич Плешак; born 13 November 1946) is a Soviet and Russian composer. He is known for his work in academic and popular music, including symphonic compositions, songs, and musical works for theatre.

Pleshak was awarded the title of Honored art worker of the Russian Federation in 2004 and has received the Prize of the Government of Saint Petersburg.

== Biography ==
Pleshak was born in Leningrad on 13 November 1946. He graduated from the Glinka Choir School in 1964 and later from the Leningrad Rimsky-Korsakov State Conservatory in 1970, where he studied choral conducting under E. P. Kudryavtseva. He completed further studies in composition in 1981 under professors V. V. Pushkov, A. D. Mnatsakanyan, and Boris Tishchenko.

From 1969 to 1975, he taught at the Leningrad Krupskaya Institute of Culture. Between 1975 and 1980, he served as head of the musical department at the Lensoviet Theatre. Since 1980, he has worked as a freelance composer.

Pleshak became a member of the Union of Soviet Composers in 1982. From 2000 to 2022, he chaired the popular music section of the Saint Petersburg Union of Composers and has served on the organization's governing board since 2000. He has also been a member of the Union of Theatre Workers of the Russian Federation since 1979.

He has composed more than 100 works for theatre, including operas, ballets, operettas, musicals, and incidental music for dramatic productions. Among his best-known musicals are Dear Sinners, Incognito from Saint Petersburg, The Night Before Christmas, The Canterville Ghost, Puss in Boots, and Knightly Passions.

Pleshak has also written numerous popular songs performed by artists.

He lives and works in Saint Petersburg.

== Personal life ==
Pleshak is married to Irina Anatolyevna Pleshak, a concertmaster at the Saint Petersburg Conservatory. They have two sons, both of whom are composers.

== Selected works ==
=== Oratorio ===
- Leningradki (2020), an oratorio for reader, mezzo-soprano, baritone, children's and women's choirs, and piano.

== Honours and awards ==
- Honored art worker of the Russian Federation (20 May 2004), for services in the field of the arts.
- Medal of the Order "For Merit to the Fatherland", 2nd class (13 November 2009), for contributions to Russian culture and art and many years of productive work.

== Bibliography ==
- Pleshak, Viktor. Life: From Piano to Fortissimo. 229 True Stories from the Diary of a Saint Petersburg Composer. Saint Petersburg: Kompozitor, 2016.
- Pleshak, Viktor; Serdobolsky, O. M. My Cheerful Profession. 192 True Stories from the Life of a Saint Petersburg Composer. Saint Petersburg: Soyuz Khudozhnikov, 2008.
- Samsonova, T. P. Saint Petersburg Composer Viktor Pleshak: Known and Unknown. Saint Petersburg: Planeta Muzyki, 2020.
- Serdobolsky, O. M. Composer Viktor Pleshak: A Portrait Sketch. Saint Petersburg: Kompozitor, 2011.
- Great Russian Biographical Encyclopedia (electronic edition), entry: "Pleshak, Viktor Vasilyevich". Version 3.0. Moscow: Biznessoft, IDDK, 2007.
