= Jahangir Mamatov =

Politician, linguist, journalist, writer

Jahongir Mamatov
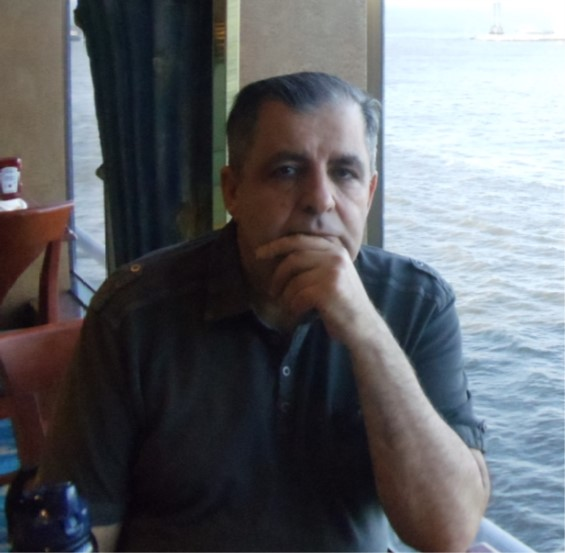

Personal details
- Born: 1 September 1955 (age 70) Samarkand Region, Uzbek SSR, Soviet Union (now Uzbekistan)
- Children: 2
- Education: Tashkent State University
- Website: jahonnoma.com

Jahangir Mamatov (Uzbek: Jahongir Mamatov; born September 1, 1955) is a PhD, linguist, lexicographer, author, journalist, and a political analyst of Central Asian issues. He is a former member of the Uzbek Parliament and a co-author of Uzbekistan's Declaration of Independence. His writings, tenure in parliament, and other political activities were often greatly at odds with the Uzbek government. He was arrested but escaped into exile for many years. In 2005 he was instrumental in forming the democratic opposition group Congress of Democratic Uzbekistan (CDU) and became its first chairman. His writings are still banned in Uzbekistan.

== During the Soviet era ==
Mamatov was born on September 1, 1955, in Samarqand Region, married in 1980, and has two children. He was educated in Samarqand and at the Department of Journalism of Tashkent State University from 1973 to 1979, where he did research in journalism and linguistics until 1981. He began his journalism career with the Toshkent Haqiqati newspaper in 1973, moving the next year to the newspaper Qishloq Haqiqati, where he stayed until 1979.

From 1980 to 1981, Mamatov was an editor at the State TV-Radio Company. He then worked for the Lenin Yoli newspaper in Samarqand Province from 1982 to 1985.

From 1985 to 1990 he was a correspondent for O’zbekiston Ovozi in Samarqand Province and Qishloq Haqiqati, where he had worked from 1974 to 1979. He also became a columnist for the satirical magazine Mushtum. During these years more than a thousand of his satirical, critical, and political analysis articles were published. Some of his articles were collected in the books Youth, Pure Dawn, and 525 Days that Shook Samarkand.

In 1990, at the age of 35, Mamatov received the title "Honored Journalist of Uzbekistan". In the same year he was elected from the Jomboy electoral district to the Uzbek Supreme Soviet (parliament), serving as a high-ranking official on its Glasnost Committee until 1993. During this period, he wrote the book Press Law and founded the newspaper Xalq So’zi, the main publication of the Uzbek Parliament.

== Uzbek independence ==
On June 20, 1990, the Supreme Soviet issued Uzbekistan's Declaration of Independence. Mamatov was one of the authors of this historic document.

Mamatov organized a parliamentary commission to investigate violent incidents in Bekobod, Boka, Parkent and concluded that they were masterminded by the Uzbek government. He showed evidence that the KGB was behind terrorist acts among the ethnic Uzbeks and Meskhetian Turks in the Parkent district of Tashkent Province. His public conclusions and accusations angered the Uzbek government, which followed and harassed him. The Central Committee of the Communist Party of Uzbekistan accused Mamatov of criticizing the Chairman of the Party, Islam Karimov. The chief justice of the Supreme Court, on his own TV program, asked the Presidium of the Supreme Soviet for permission to arrest Mamatov, but the attempt was rejected for lack of parliamentary support.

On August 17, 1991, to protest the 1991 Soviet coup d'état attempt in Moscow opposing Mikhail Gorbachev's reform program and the new union treaty for decentralizing Soviet power and returning it to the republics, Mamatov joined some of his colleagues in a demonstration in front of the Parliament building and publicly burned his Communist Party membership certificate. He later stood for election as chairman of the Uzbek Journalists Association and claimed that the government falsified the election results.

President Islam Karimov and his allies in parliament shut down the Glasnost Committee, but once Mamatov resigned, the committee was re-instated.

In 1991, in the seventh session of the Uzbek Parliament, Mamatov and some of his fellow deputies put forward measures in Parliament to limit Karimov's attempts to become an absolute dictator. Under pressure from democratic deputies, the Uzbek government had to permit the organization of a committee to regulate relations between the president of Uzbekistan and the parliament. Mamatov became the Presidential Advisor for Parliamentary Relations in that committee and was subsequently appointed as a Chief of Uzbek State Television-Deputy of the State Radio and Television Committee.

== In opposition ==
In 1992 Mamatov felt compelled to resign his position in protest. Before his resignation, Mamatov declared that dictatorship was reigning in Uzbekistan. It was the first time a high government official openly declared that his resignation was a sign of protest against Karimov.

In parliament, Mamatov continued to lead a group of opposition representatives who strongly and openly criticized the emerging dictatorship under Karimov's rule and persisted in fighting for democracy. Mamatov quickly emerged as a leader among the most prominent critics of Karimov regime's state policy. He was one of the organizers of the March 28, 1992, Uzbek Democratic Coalition Forum, which took place at the Erk/Liberty Democratic Party headquarters.

After that, Mamatov led the non-governmental organization Turon, a language research organization. Even though only the Supreme Court of Uzbekistan had the power to shut down Turon, the Ministry of Justice, violating the law, abolished Turon and confiscated all its papers, assets, and other possessions.

On February 7, 1993, the Uzbek government banned Erk (Liberty), the newspaper affiliated with the Erk/Liberty Democratic Party, the main party of the democratic political opposition. At that time, Mamatov was a chief editor of the paper as well as deputy chairman of the party. On February 13, Uzbek police forcibly evicted Mamatov and his family from their house in Tashkent. The government seized the house, forcing Mamatov to move to his hometown, Samarqand City. He was charged with criticizing President Karimov while in parliament for his dictatorial behavior. On April 17, the Uzbek authorities arrested Mamatov in Samarqand.

He later wrote the book Palace Games about Karimov's actions. Even though the government confiscated the manuscript, the samizdat became very popular. In 1994 the Erk/Liberty Democratic Party serialized the book in Erk.

== In exile ==
With the help of supporters Mamatov was able to escape Uzbekistan. His wife, the mother of four children, was pressured to divorce him but refused to do so. She was convicted and sentenced to two years in prison.

After securing his family's release and emigration from Uzbekistan, Mamatov moved to Turkey. From 1994 to 1998 he worked at Koç University in Istanbul, as a correspondent of the BBC Uzbek Service, and as a columnist for the newspaper Turkiye. While living abroad he wrote his book Quvg’in (Exile, a trilogy), which was critical of Uzbekistan's tyrannical regime.

The Uzbek government sent secret agents three times to kill Mamatov, which led to his being granted political asylum in the United States through the United Nations in February 1998.

Mamatov resumed his career as a journalist in the VOA Uzbek Service, US from 1999 to 2004. Due to his critical reports the Uzbek government ordered the arrest of his relatives, including his sisters. With pressure from the U.S. Congress, U.S. government, and international human rights organizations, Mamatov's relatives were released.

In 2005 Mamatov brought together leaders of the Uzbek democratic opposition, which had been unable to effectively coordinate activities over the previous 15 years. A Congress of Democratic Uzbekistan (CDU), open to all opposition groups and individuals, convened on September 25, 2005. Mamatov served as its chairman until 2011.

Mamatov also taught Uzbek in language schools and since 2001 has been working as a senior linguist at the Language Research Center (LRC).

== Books ==
Jahangir Mamatov is the author of nearly 40 books. Many of his books were published in the United States, Turkey, and Azerbaijan, yet his books are strictly forbidden in Uzbekistan. He is the author of six linguistic books which were all published in the United States.

He has been publishing his personal website and the CDU website since 2001.
