= Mikhail Gerasimov (archaeologist) =

Soviet archaeologist and anthropologist (1907–1970)

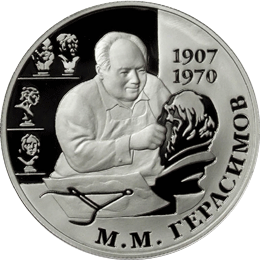
- Gerasimov on a Russian coin
- Born: Mikhail Mikhaylovich Gerasimov; 2 September 1907; Saint Petersburg, Russian Empire
- Died: 21 July 1970 (aged 62)
- Occupation: Archaeologist
- Children: 4

Mikhail Mikhaylovich Gerasimov (Russian: Михаи́л Миха́йлович Гера́симов; 2 September 1907 – 21 July 1970) was a Soviet archaeologist, and anthropologist who discovered the Mal'ta–Buret' culture and developed the first technique of forensic sculpture based on findings of anthropology, archaeology, paleontology, and forensic science. He studied the skulls and meticulously reconstructed the faces of more than 200 people, ranging from the earliest excavated Homo sapiens and neanderthals, to the Middle Ages' monarchs and dignitaries, including emperor Timur (Tamerlane), Yaroslav the Wise, Ivan the Terrible, and Friedrich Schiller.

He led the expedition to open the tomb of Timur, despite being warned that the tomb was cursed.

== Early life ==
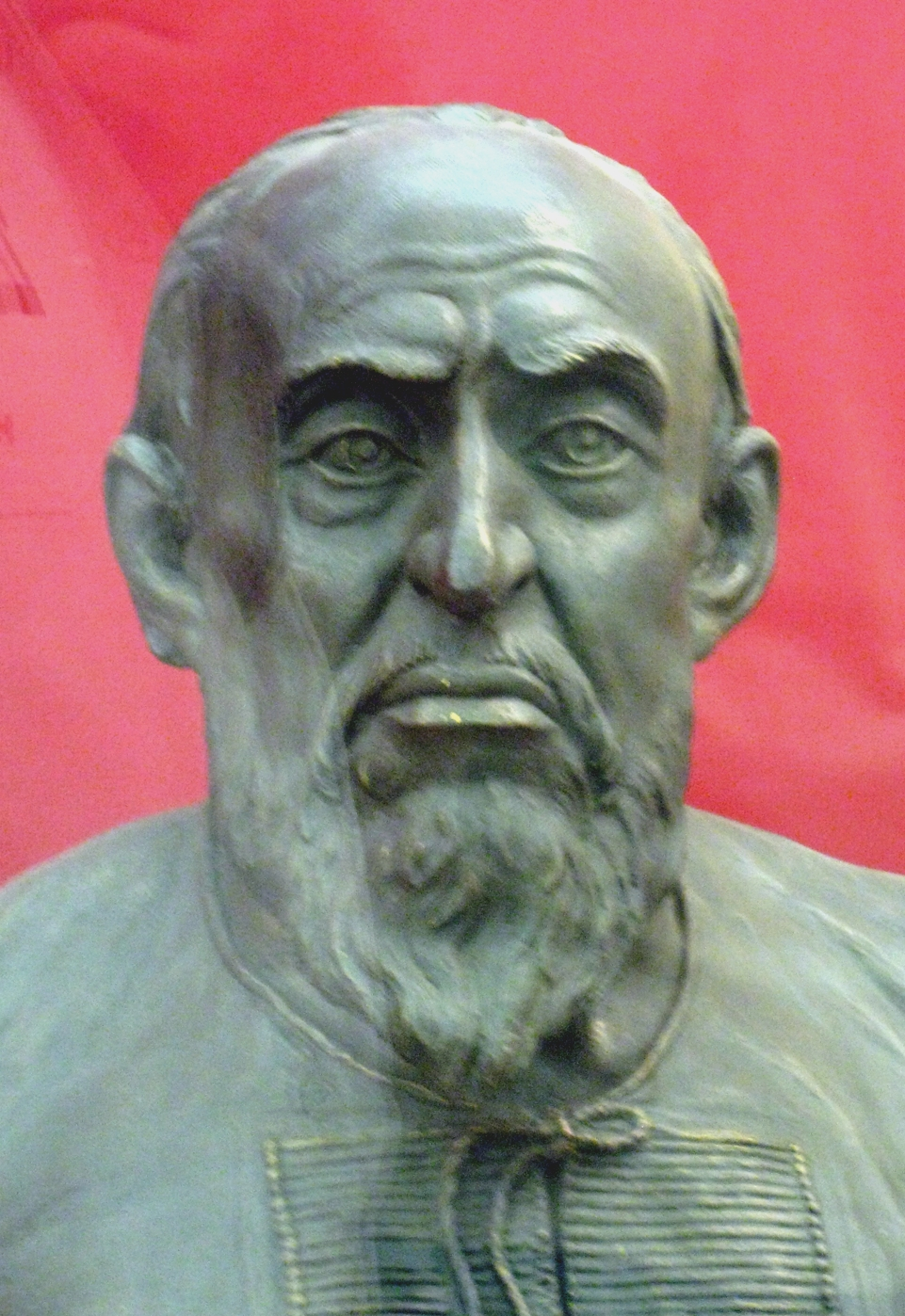
Reconstruction of Ivan the Terrible

Gerasimov was born 1907 in St. Petersburg shortly before his doctor father was posted to settlement near Irkutsk. As a child he studied the bones of prehistoric animals that were unearthed during the construction of the area.

Gerasimov produced his first reconstructions of prehistoric Neanderthal and Java Man, in 1927 (Gerasimov, p. 5); they are exhibited in the Irkutsk museum. Gerasimov learned to take a skull of early hominids and, by dint of elaborate measurements and anatomical research, to form a face that people would recognize, sometimes including the most common expression. As he wrote in his autobiography, The Face Finder (1968), he was fascinated with an opportunity to "gaze on the faces of those long dead." It took a decade of studies and experiments to come close to individual portrait resolution quality of historical persons (1938, Gerasimov, p. 7), however his first public work of this type is dated 1930 – the face of Maria Dostoyevskaya, mother of Fyodor Dostoyevsky.

In 1928, Gerasimov studied in the archaeology department of the Irkutsk University where he studied under professor Bernhard Petri. He began to investigate Stone Age sites in Siberia such as Malta. In 1932 he moved to Leningrad for a graduate study. There he experimented with several skulls to find out if he could reconstruct faces of racial types. In 1937–1939, he reconstructed three faces from skulls of the Academy of Sciences of the Soviet Union — a Papuan, a Kazakh and a Khevsur Caucasian — and performed numerous forensic reconstructions for the NKVD. He received important public exposure by reconstructing the faces of Yaroslav I the Wise (1938) and Andrei Bogolyubsky (1939, dates referenced to Gerasimov, p. 185–186).

Gerasimov described his method in detail in the book “Basics of Facial Reconstruction from the Skull" ("Основы восстановления лица по черепу") which was published in 1949, and also in the book "Reconstruction of the face from the skull" ("Восстановление лица по черепу"), published in 1955.

== Faces of kings and leaders ==
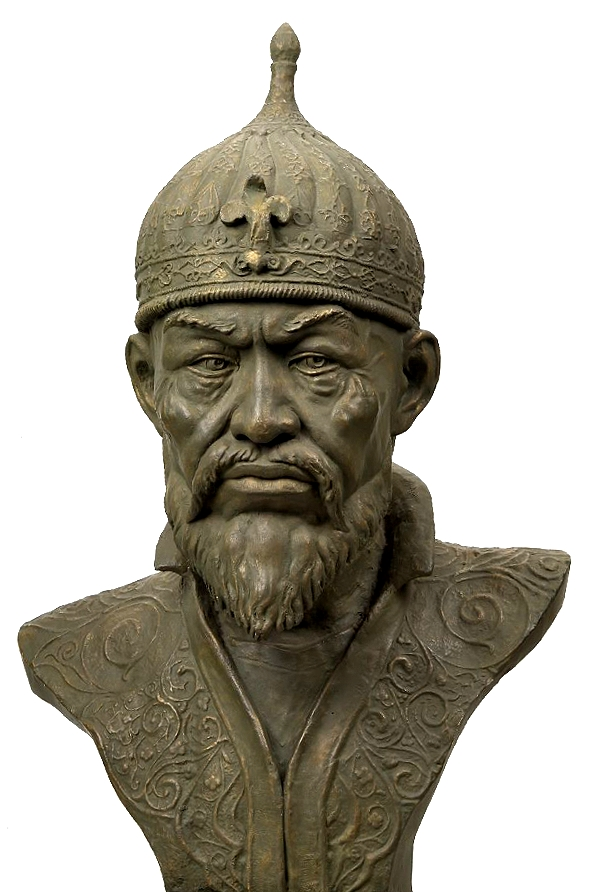
Reconstruction of Timur (Tamerlane)

In June 1941, Stalin sent Gerasimov to Uzbekistan with a team of archaeologists to open the tombs of Timur and other members of the Timurid dynasty. An apocryphal story from this time claims that Gerasimov's team opening Timur's tomb resulted in the German invasion of the Soviet Union. According to the story, Timur's memorial bore the warning “When I rise from the dead, the world shall tremble”, and when the sarcophagus was raised and opened on June 19, another inscription inside the casket read: “Whomsoever opens my tomb shall unleash an invader more terrible than I". Three days later, on June 22, Germany commenced Operation Barbarossa. Even though people close to Gerasimov claim that this story is a fabrication, the legend of the Curse of Timur persists. During World War II, Gerasimov worked at the military hospital in Tashkent; hundreds of victims of the war provided him with important statistical data on human skulls of different races.

Gerasimov continued to hone his methods. In 1950, he received the USSR State Prize and the state established the Laboratory for Plastic Reconstruction (now in the Institute of Ethnology) where he continued his research. He also acquired a reputation as a man who charmed ladies by complimenting them on the shape of their lips.

In 1953, the Soviet Ministry of Culture decided to open the tomb of Ivan the Terrible (at Cathedral of the Archangel) and Gerasimov reconstructed his face. Afterwards, he received an extra month's pay for the job. In 1961, Gerasimov travelled to Europe to help the Germans find the skull of the poet Schiller from the skulls in a mass grave. In 1967, Ivan Sirko's skull was sent to Gerasimov for creation of the sculptural portrait of the legendary Cossack Otaman.

Gerasimov died in 1970 and was survived by four children.

== Heritage ==
Gerasimov's method has spread across the globe and has been instrumental in reconstructions of what the pharaohs or, controversially, Jesus might have looked like. In 1991 Russian investigators also used the methods to clarify the identities of the remains of the family of the last Tsar.

Gerasimov's work is exhibited at:

- State Historical Museum, Moscow
- Anthropological museum of Moscow State University
- Museums of Georgia (skulls of Georgian origin, 1946)
- Museums of Uzbekistan (skulls of Timurid dynasty, 1941–1942)

== Popular culture ==
- In popular culture (e.g., the film Day Watch), Gerasimov's exhumation of Tamerlane on 22 June 1941 is represented as the violation of an ancient curse which led to the outbreak of the German-Soviet War, whose turning point coincided with Gerasimov's eventual reburial of the ancient conqueror's skull. Gerasimov was also fictionalized as Professor Andreev in the detective novel Gorky Park.

== Bibliography ==
- Gerasimov, M.M. (1931). Mal’ta – Paleolithic Station (preliminary data): Findings of excavations in 1928/29. Vlast’ truda (in Russian).
- Gerasimov, M.M. (1958) Paleolithic Mal’ta-site (excavation (1956–1957). Soviet Ethnography, 3, 28–53 (in Russian).

== See also ==
- List of Russian artists
- Venus figurines of Mal'ta
