= Lev Oshanin (anthropologist) =

Soviet professor, medical doctor, and anthropologist

Lev Vasilyevich Oshanin (Russian: Лев Васи́льевич Оша́нин; 9 March 1884 – 9 January 1962) was a Soviet professor, medical doctor, anthropologist, and founder of the department of anthropology at National University of Uzbekistan in Tashkent. Oshanin was most notable for his anthropological work in Central Asia.

== Life ==
Lev Oshanin was the son of Vasily Oshanin, a noted scientist and explorer of Central Asia. Oshanin was trained as a medical doctor and participated in the First World War. He later worked in hospitals in the city of Tashkent in what is now Uzbekistan. Oshanin also practiced anthropology and was one of the few anthropologists in Central Asia. In 1930 he gained a position at Tashkent University and went on to found the university’s Department of Anthropology, which he chaired until his death in 1962.

Oshanin was notable in the world of anthropology because of his extensive work in Soviet Central Asia. He traveled widely in the region and conducted numerous anthropological studies of various ethnic groups in the most remote corners of Central Asia. In 1926 Oshanin was commissioned by the Soviet government to prepare a study of the "daily life and anthropological type of Uzbek women." Oshanin's research team interviewed and physically examined several hundred Uzbek women from Tashkent.

Oshanin died in Tashkent in 1962 and is buried in Botkin cemetery in Tashkent. Oshanin’s daughter, Helen Lvovna May, subsequently worked and taught at Tashkent University.

== Published works ==
- Oshanin, L. V. Anthropological composition of the population of Central Asia and the ethnogenesis of its peoples. Cambridge, Mass: Peabody Museum, 1964
- Ошанин Л.В. Данные к географическому распространению главнейших антропологических признаков население Средней Азии и опыт выявления основных расовых типов Средней Азии. // Tp.IV. Всесоюзного съезда зоологов, анатомов и гистологов. Киев, 1931. (Oshanin L.V. Data about geographic spread of the main features of anthropological populations of Central Asia and experience in identifying the major racial types in Central Asia. / / All-Union Congress of Zoologists, anatomists and histologist. Kyiv, 1931)
