= Abdusamat Taymetov =

First Uzbek pilot (1909–1981)

- Abdusamat Toymetov
- Born: 9 January 1909; Chernak village, Syr-Darya Oblast, Russian Empire
- Died: 8 July 1981 (aged 72); Tashkent, Uzbek SSR, USSR
- Spouse: Bibiniso Boltaboyeva
- Awards: Order of Lenin; Honorary diploma of the Presidium of the Supreme Soviet of the Uzbek SSR (1965)

Abdusamat Taymetov (Russian: Абдусамат Тайметов, Uzbek: Abdusamat Toymetov; 9 January 1909 – 8 July 1981) was the first Uzbek pilot. A graduate of the Balashov Aviation School, he flew a wide variety of aircraft, transporting mail and passengers as part of the civil air fleet during peacetime and flying military cargo missions during World War II.

== Early life ==
Taymetov was born on 9 January 1909 to an impoverished Uzbek family. His mother died in 1911, and in 1914 his father died, after which he and his siblings lived with their cousin Baymet. In 1919 he entered a Soviet-run school while still attending a maktab in evenings. Having become a member of the Komsomol in 1922, he and his brothers participated in campaigns to eliminate illiteracy. While farms were being collectivized in 1927 and 1928 he became a village council secretary, since as a primary school graduate he was relatively educated at the time. In 1929 he studied agrochemistry in Tashkent for three months, after which he returned to his hometown of Chernak to work in pest reduction on the cotton farms. The next year he entered an industrial school in Tashkent, but while a student in summer 1932 he and 100 other Komsomol members at the school were mobilized and sent to the Tajik SSR to combat insurgent movements.

== Prewar aviation career ==
As a Komsomol member, he was admitted to an Osoaviahim glider school in 1932, where he would train in evenings after attending the industrial school during the day. In 1933 he was reprimanded and threatened with arrest for having practiced gliding instead of going to the factory, but was left off with a warning. Later that year he was admitted to the Balashov Aviation School, where out of over 2000 cadets he was the only Uzbek. Not being completely fluent in Russian, his second language, he struggled at times to understand the material, especially the names of all the aircraft parts, but after managing to get by theoretical training, he flew under the commander of flight instructor Konstantin Kartashov, – a Russian who was born in Dzhambul and fluent in Uzbek. After graduating from the school he worked in the civil air fleet from 1935 to 1941. While stationed at an aeroclub as a flight instructor from 1936 to 1937 he trained new aviators, including the first Uzbek women parachutists. His future wife, Bibinis Baltabaeva, was one of those parachutists. In addition to training new pilots, he flew regional flights to the Kyrgyz, Tajik, Turkmen, and Kazakh SSRs, where he participated in the establishment of new airfields and mail routes. By 1940 he became well acquainted with a variety of aircraft types, including the U-2, P-5, PR-5, G-2, PS-9, Stal-3, Yak-12, and UT-2.

== World War II ==
After the start of Operation Barbarossa he requested to be sent to the front, but was initially denied and retained as a flight instructor instead. From 1941 to 1942 he trained 71 pilots, after which he mastered piloting a new variant of the Li-2. In February 1944 he was sent to the front per his request, and assigned to the 10th Guards Aviation Division. That year flew 109 night missions delivering cargo to troops and partisans as well as reconnaissance. As pilot-in-command, his crew consisted of co-pilot Pyotr Gordienko, navigator Nikolai Smirnov, flight engineer Nikolai Dyomin, and radio operator Mikhail Malinkin. On 1 January 1945 he was reassigned to the 19th Special-Purpose Civil Aviation Regiment, in which he flew missions in Poland to provide assistance to partisans under Sergey Pritytsky. In addition to the Soviet Order of the Patriotic War and Order of the Red Banner he was awarded the Polish Virtuti Militari for his sorties. On 9 May 1945 he flew in the mission that delivered the German Instrument of Surrender and Victory Banner to Moscow.

== Postwar ==
Once the war ended, Taymetov returned to flying within the Civil Air Fleet, and became the commander of the 161st squadron before becoming the head of Tashkent Airport. By 1963, he totaled 6,185 flight hours. At age 56 he graduated from the Law Faculty of Tashkent State University, after which he worked as the chief legal advisor to the Uzbek Civil Aviation Administration. He died on 8 July 1981 in Tashkent.
